= List of elm synonyms and accepted names =

Synonym

- Australian Elm
  - Accepted Names: Aphananthe philippinensis and Duboisia myoporoides
- Caucasian Elm
  - Accepted Name: Zelkova carpinifolia
- Chaetoptelea mexicana Liebm.
  - Accepted Name: Ulmus mexicana (Liebm.) Planch.
- Indian Elm (Monkey Biscuit Tree)
  - Accepted Name: Holoptelea integrifolia (Roxb.) Planch.
- Microptelea parvifolia (Jacquin) Spach
  - Accepted Name: Ulmus parvifolia Jacq.
- Planera parvifolia (Jacquin) Sweet
  - Accepted Name: Ulmus parvifolia Jacq.
- Ulmus abelicea Sibth. & Sm. in error.
  - Accepted Name: Zelkova abelicea
- Ulmus acuta Dumort.
  - Accepted Name: Ulmus laevis Pall.
- Ulmus adiantifolia Hort. Kirchner
  - Accepted Name: Ulmus glabra 'Crispa'
- Ulmus alba Raf.
  - Accepted Name: Ulmus americana L.
- Ulmus ambigua Beldie
  - Accepted Name: ?Ulmus × hollandica?
- Ulmus americana Planch.
  - Accepted Name: Ulmus americana L.
- Ulmus americana Mast.
  - Accepted Name: Ulmus × hollandica 'Vegeta'
- Ulmus americana aurea (Calmphtout Nursery, Belgium)
  - Accepted Name: Ulmus glabra 'Lutescens'
- Ulmus americana macrophylla aurea Späth
  - Accepted Name: Ulmus × hollandica 'Macrophylla Aurea'
- Ulmus americana L. var. alba Aiton ,
  - Accepted Name: Ulmus americana L.
- Ulmus americana L. var. aspera Chapm.
  - Accepted Name: Ulmus americana L.
- Ulmus americana L. var. aurea Temple, F. L. ex Rehder
  - Accepted Name: Ulmus americana 'Aurea'
- Ulmus americana L. var. bartramii Planch.
  - Accepted Name: Ulmus americana L.
- Ulmus americana L. var. floridana (Chapm.) Little
  - Accepted Name: Ulmus americana L.
- Ulmus americana L. var. glabra Planch.
  - Accepted Name: Ulmus americana L.
- Ulmus americana L. var. pendula Aiton
  - Accepted Name: Ulmus americana L.
- Ulmus americana L. var. scabra Spach
  - Accepted Name: Ulmus americana L.
- Ulmus americana L. var. foliis variegatis Hort. Loudon
  - Accepted Name: Ulmus americana 'Folia Aurea Variegata'
- Ulmus americana L. var. glabra Walpers
  - Accepted Name: Ulmus americana 'Pendula'
- Ulmus americana L. var. littlefordii Bailey & Bailey
  - Accepted Name: Ulmus americana 'Littleford'
- Ulmus americana L. var. molinensis Bailey & Bailey
  - Accepted Name: Ulmus americana 'Moline'
- Ulmus americana L. var. pyramidalis Wesmael
  - Accepted Name: Ulmus americana 'Pyramidata'
- Ulmus americana L. var. rubra Aiton
  - Accepted Name: Ulmus rubra Muhl.
- Ulmus americana f. alba (Aiton) Fern.
  - Accepted Name: Ulmus americana L.
- Ulmus americana f. ascendens Slavin
  - Accepted Name: Ulmus americana L.
- Ulmus americana f. columnaris Rehder
  - Accepted Name: Ulmus americana L.
- Ulmus americana f. intercedens Fern.
  - Accepted Name: Ulmus americana L.
- Ulmus americana f. laevior Fern.
  - Accepted Name: Ulmus americana L.
- Ulmus americana L. f. nigrescens Dieck
  - Accepted Name: Ulmus americana 'Nigricans'
- Ulmus americana f. pendula (Aiton) Fern.
  - Accepted Name: Ulmus americana L.
- Ulmus americana f. viridis Seym.
  - Accepted Name: Ulmus americana L.
- Ulmus americana L. 'Augustine Ascending'
  - Accepted Name: Ulmus americana 'Augustine'
- Ulmus americana L. 'Brandon Ascending'
  - Accepted Name: Ulmus americana 'Brandon'
- Ulmus americana L. 'Delaware II'
  - Accepted Name: Ulmus americana 'Delaware'
- Ulmus americana L. 'Elm College'
  - Accepted Name: Ulmus americana 'College'
- Ulmus americana L. 'Exhibition Boulevard'
  - Accepted Name: Ulmus americana 'Exhibition'
- Ulmus americana L. 'Fastigiata'
  - Accepted Name: Ulmus americana 'Fiorei'
- Ulmus americana L. 'Iowa State University'
  - Accepted Name: Ulmus americana 'Iowa State'
- Ulmus americana L. 'Klehm'
  - Accepted Name: Ulmus americana 'Klehmii'
- Ulmus americana L. 'Minneapolis Park Board'
  - Accepted Name: Ulmus americana 'Minneapolis Park'
- Ulmus americana L. 'Patmore Ascending'
  - Accepted Name: Ulmus americana 'Patmore'
- Ulmus androssowii Litw. var. subhirsuta C.K.Schneid.
  - Accepted Name: Ulmus chumlia Melville & Heybroek
- Ulmus androssowii var. virgata (Planch.) Grudz.
  - Accepted Name: Ulmus chumlia Melville & Heybroek
- Ulmus anglica Druce
  - Accepted Name: Ulmus minor 'Atinia'
- Ulmus antarctica Hort. G.Kirchn.
  - Accepted Name: Ulmus × viminalis Lodd.
- Ulmus araxina Takht.
  - Accepted Name: Ulmus minor Mill.
- Ulmus asperrima Simonk.
  - Accepted Name: Ulmus minor 'Atinia'
- Ulmus aquatica Raf. in error
  - Accepted Name: Planera aquaticaJ.F.Gmelin
- Ulmus atinia Walker
  - Accepted Name: Ulmus minor 'Atinia'
- Ulmus aurea Hort. ex. K.Koch
  - Accepted Name: Ulmus minor Mill.
- Ulmus basicordata Holl.
  - Accepted Name: ? (Nomen dubium)
- Ulmus batavina Koch
  - Accepted Name: Ulmus × hollandica 'Belgica'
- Ulmus belgica Weston
  - Accepted Name: Ulmus × hollandica 'Belgica'
- Ulmus berardii Simon-Louis
  - Accepted Name: Ulmus 'Berardii'
- Ulmus betulaefolia Lodd.
  - Accepted Name: Ulmus × viminalis Lodd.
- Ulmus betulifolia Lodd.
  - Accepted Name: Ulmus × viminalis Lodd.
- Ulmus betuloides Hort. ex. Steud.
  - Accepted Name: Ulmus × viminalis Lodd.
- Ulmus boissieri (Boiss.), Grudz.
  - Accepted Name: Ulmus minor Mill.
- Ulmus 'Boulevard'
  - Accepted Name: Ulmus 'Rosehill'
- Ulmus brandisiana A. Henry
  - Accepted Name: Ulmus chumlia Melville & Heybroek
- Ulmus brandisiana C. K. Schneid.
  - Accepted Name: Ulmus wallichiana subsp. xanthoderma Melville & Heybroek
- Ulmus 'Broadleaf Hybrid' Kammerer
  - Accepted Name: Ulmus pumila 'Green King'
- Ulmus bubyriana Litv.
  - Accepted Name: Ulmus minor 'Umbraculifera'
- Ulmus 'Buisman'
  - Accepted Name: Ulmus minor 'Christine Buisman'
- Ulmus buxifolia Hort. G.Nicholson
  - Accepted Name: Ulmus 'Myrtifolia'
- Ulmus campestre
  - Accepted Name: Ulmus minor Mill.
- Ulmus campestris Kom.
  - Accepted Name: Ulmus davidiana var. japonica (Rehder), Nakai
- Ulmus campestris L., Mill., Willk.
  - Accepted Name: Ulmus glabra Huds.
- Ulmus campestris L., Loudon, Planch., Moss
  - Accepted Name: Ulmus minor 'Atinia'
- Ulmus campestris Smith
  - Accepted Name: Ulmus minor 'Plotii'
- Ulmus campestris acutifolia W.Mast.
  - Accepted Name: Ulmus 'Acutifolia'
- Ulmus campestris argenteo-variegata Weston, Krüssmann
  - Accepted Name: Ulmus 'Argenteo-Variegata'
- Ulmus campestris bataviana Simon-Louis
  - Accepted Name: Ulmus × hollandica 'Belgica'
- Ulmus campestris elegans foliis argenteo variegatis Goeschke
  - Accepted Name: Ulmus × hollandica 'Tricolor'
- Ulmus campestris foliis albo punctata C. de Vos
  - Accepted Name: Ulmus 'Folia Alba-Punctata'
- Ulmus campestris foliis maculatis Lodd.
  - Accepted Name: Ulmus 'Argenteo-Variegata'
- Ulmus campestris foliis rubra de Smet
  - Accepted Name: Ulmus 'Folia Rubra'
- Ulmus campestris globosa Behnsch
  - Accepted Name Ulmus 'Globosa'
- Ulmus campestris haarlemensis Springer
  - Accepted Name: Ulmus × hollandica 'Haarlemensis'
- Ulmus campestris hertfordensis angustifolia Boulger
  - Accepted Name: Ulmus 'Hertfordensis Angustifolia'
- Ulmus campestris hertfordensis latifolia Boulger
  - Accepted Name: Ulmus 'Hertfordensis Latifolia'
- Ulmus campestris latifolia foliis aureo-variegatis Baudriller
  - Accepted Name: Ulmus 'Latifolia Aureo-Variegata'
- Ulmus campestris lutescens Dieck
  - Accepted Name: Ulmus 'Lutescens'
- Ulmus campestris marmorata Dieck
  - Accepted Name: Ulmus 'Marmorata'
- Ulmus campestris pendula David
  - Accepted Name: Ulmus pumila 'Pendula'
- Ulmus campestris pendula W.Mast.
  - Accepted Name: Ulmus × hollandica 'Smithii'
- Ulmus campestris pyramidalis (Vicary Gibbs)
  - Accepted Name: Ulmus 'Pyramidalis'
- Ulmus campestris rubra Simon-Louis
  - Accepted Name: Ulmus 'Rubra'
- Ulmus campestris rueppelli Späth
  - Accepted Name: Ulmus minor 'Rueppellii'
- Ulmus campestris viminalis stricta Boulger
  - Accepted Name: Ulmus × viminalis Lodd.
- Ulmus campestris virens Loudon
  - Accepted Name: Ulmus × hollandica 'Virens'
- Ulmus campestris wendworthiensis Schelle
  - Accepted Name: Ulmus × hollandica 'Vegeta' (Huntingdon Elm)
- Ulmus campestris wentworthiensis Späth
  - Accepted Name: Ulmus × hollandica 'Vegeta' (Huntingdon Elm)
- Ulmus campestris var. australis Henry
  - Accepted Name: Ulmus glabra 'Australis'
- Ulmus campestris var. betulaefolia Loudon
  - Accepted Name: Ulmus × viminalis Lodd.
- Ulmus campestris var. chinensis Loudon
  - Accepted Name: Ulmus parvifolia Jacq.
- Ulmus campestris var. cicestria (W. A. & J. Mackie nursery, Norwich)
  - Accepted Name: Ulmus × hollandica 'Vegeta' (Chichester Elm)
- Ulmus campestris var. clemmeri
  - Accepted Name: Ulmus × hollandica 'Klemmer'
- Ulmus campestris var. dauvessi Lavallée
  - Accepted Name: Ulmus × hollandica 'Dauvessei'
- Ulmus campestris var. dumontii Mottet, Krüssmann
  - Accepted Name: Ulmus × hollandica 'Dumont'
- Ulmus campestris var. erecta Loudon
  - Accepted Name: Ulmus minor 'Erecta'
- Ulmus campestris var. escaillardii Lavallée
  - Accepted Name: Ulmus glabra 'Escaillard'
- Ulmus campestris var. foliis aureis Loudon
  - Accepted Name: Ulmus 'Folia Aurea'
- Ulmus campestris var. glabra Hartig, Planch., Asch. & Graebn.
  - Accepted Name: Ulmus minor Mill.
- Ulmus campestris var. gracilis monstrosa Lavallee
  - Accepted Name: Ulmus minor 'Sarniensis'
- Ulmus campestris var. japonica Rehder
  - Accepted Name: Ulmus davidiana var. japonica (Rehder), Nakai
- Ulmus campestris var. laciniatus Mathieu
  - Accepted Name: Ulmus glabra 'Crispa'
- Ulmus campestris var. laevis F.Schmidt
  - Accepted Name: Ulmus davidiana var. japonica (Rehder), Nakai
- Ulmus campestris var. laevis Spach, Planch.
  - Accepted Name: Ulmus minor Mill.
- Ulmus campestris Huds. var. microphylla Boiss.
  - Accepted Name: Ulmus minor Mill.
- Ulmus campestris var. microphylla pendula Hartwig & Rumpler
  - Accepted Name: Ulmus × viminalis Lodd.
- Ulmus campestris var. modiolina Dumont de Courset
  - Accepted Name: Ulmus × hollandica 'Modiolina'
- Ulmus campestris var. monumentalis Rinz.
  - Accepted Name: Ulmus minor Mill.
- Ulmus campestris var. myrtifolia G.Nicholson
  - Accepted Name: Ulmus 'Myrtifolia'
- Ulmus campestris var. nuda subvar. fastigiata Dampieri Vilv.
  - Accepted Name: Ulmus × hollandica 'Dampieri'
- Ulmus campestris var. nuda subvar. fastigiata oxfortii Wesmael
  - Accepted Name: Ulmus minor 'Sarniensis'
- Ulmus campestris var. nuda subvar. incisa Vilv. Wesmael
  - Accepted Name: Ulmus × viminalis Lodd.
- Ulmus campestris var. nuda subvar. microphylla laciniata Vilv.
  - Accepted Name: Ulmus minor 'Laciniata'
- Ulmus campestris var. pumila (L.), Maxim.
  - Accepted Name: Ulmus pumila L.
- Ulmus campestris var. pumila Ledeb.
  - Accepted Name: Ulmus pumila L.
- Ulmus campestris var. purpurascens Lavallee
  - Accepted Name: 'Purpurascens'
- Ulmus campestris var. rotundifolia G.Nicholson & Mottet
  - Accepted Name: Ulmus 'Rotundifolia'
- Ulmus campestris var. rubescens Schwerin
  - Accepted Name: Ulmus laevis 'Colorans'
- Ulmus campestris var. stricta Audibert
  - Accepted Name: Ulmus × viminalis Lodd.
- Ulmus campestris var. variegata nova G.Nicholson
  - Accepted Name: Ulmus 'Variegata Nova'
- Ulmus campestris var. virginalis Lavallée
  - Accepted Name: Ulmus × viminalis Lodd.
- Ulmus campestris var. vulgaris Shiras.
  - Accepted Name: Ulmus davidiana var. japonica (Rehder), Nakai
- Ulmus campestris f. fol. argenteo-marmoratis Dippel
  - Accepted Name: Ulmus 'Marmorata'
- Ulmus campestris f. fol. picturatis Dippel
  - Accepted Name: Ulmus minor 'Picturata'
- Ulmus campestris f. microphylla albo-dentata Dippel
  - Accepted Name: Ulmus glabra 'Albo-Dentata'
- Ulmus campestris f. rufa Dieck
  - Accepted Name: Ulmus 'Rufa'
- Ulmus campestris 'Betulinoides'
  - Accepted Name: Ulmus × viminalis Lodd.
- Ulmus campestris 'Biltil' in error
  - Accepted Name: Ulmus minor 'Biltii'
- Ulmus campestris 'Cochleata'
  - Accepted Name: Ulmus minor 'Cucullata'
- Ulmus campestris 'Klemmer'
  - Accepted Name: Ulmus 'Klemmer'
- Ulmus campestris 'Lutescens'
  - Accepted Name: Ulmus glabra 'Lutescens'
- Ulmus campestris 'Microphylla Purpurea'
  - Accepted Name: Ulmus minor 'Microphylla Purpurea'
- Ulmus campestris 'Microphylla Rubra'
  - Accepted Name: Ulmus minor 'Microphylla Rubra'
- Ulmus campestris 'Pendula'
  - Accepted Name: Ulmus × hollandica 'Smithii'
- Ulmus campestris 'Wentworthii'
  - Accepted Name: Ulmus × hollandica 'Vegeta' (Huntingdon Elm)
- Ulmus canadiensis Hort.
  - Accepted Name: Ulmus × hollandica 'Vegeta'
- Ulmus canescens Melville
  - Accepted Name: Ulmus minor Mill.
- Ulmus carpinifolia Gled.
  - Accepted Name: Ulmus minor Mill.
- Ulmus carpinifolia Gled. var. glandulosa Lindl.
  - Accepted Name: Ulmus minor 'Glandulosa'
- Ulmus carpinifolia var. gracilis Krüssmann
  - Accepted Name: Ulmus minor 'Umbraculifera Gracilis'
- Ulmus carpinifolia var. horsholmii Melville
  - Accepted Name: Ulmus minor 'Hoersholmiensis'
- Ulmus carpinifolia var. suberosa (Moench) Rehder
  - Accepted Name: Ulmus minor Mill.
- Ulmus carpinifolia 'Dampier'
  - Accepted Name: Ulmus × hollandica 'Dampieri'
- Ulmus carpinifolia 'Hoersholm'
  - Accepted Name: Ulmus minor 'Hoersholmiensis'
- Ulmus carpinifolia 'Hoersholmensis'
  - Accepted Name: Ulmus minor 'Hoersholmiensis'
- Ulmus carpinifolia 'Hoersholmii'
  - Accepted Name: Ulmus minor 'Hoersholmiensis'
- Ulmus carpinifolia 'Microphylla Pendula'
  - Accepted Name: Ulmus minor 'Sarniensis'
- Ulmus cavaleriei H.Léveillé in error
  - Accepted Name: Pteroceltis tatarinowii Maxim.
- Ulmus celtidea Litvinov
  - Accepted Name: Ulmus laevis var. celtidea Rogowicz
- Ulmus 'Charisma'
  - Accepted Name: Ulmus 'Morton Glossy' = Triumph
- Ulmus chinensis Persoon
  - Accepted Name: Ulmus parvifolia Jacq.
- Ulmus ciliata Ehrh.
  - Accepted Name: Ulmus laevis Pall.
- Ulmus cinerea G.Kirchn.
  - Accepted Name: Ulmus glabra 'Nigra'
- Ulmus cinerea Leroy
  - Accepted Name: Ulmus × hollandica 'Cinerea'
- Ulmus communis Carrière?
  - Accepted Name: Ulmus glabra Huds.
- Ulmus communis ornata Carrière (in error)
  - Accepted Name: Ulmus laevis 'Ornata'
- Ulmus coreana Nakai
  - Accepted Name: Ulmus parvifolia Jacq.
- Ulmus coreana var. laevigata Nakai
  - Accepted Name: Ulmus parvifolia Jacq.
- Ulmus coreana var. lanceolata Nakai
  - Accepted Name: Ulmus parvifolia Jacq.
- Ulmus coritana Melville
  - Accepted Name: Ulmus minor Mill.
- Ulmus corylacea Dumrt.
  - Accepted Name: Ulmus glabra Huds.
- Ulmus corylifolia Boreau
  - Accepted Name: Ulmus glabra Huds.
- Ulmus corylifolia Host.
  - Accepted Name: Ulmus glabra Huds.
- Ulmus corylifolia Zapal.
  - Accepted Name: Ulmus glabra 'Cornuta'
- Ulmus cracoviensis Zapal.
  - Accepted Name: Ulmus minor Mill.
- Ulmus crenata Hort. Paris.
  - Accepted Name: Zelkova crenata
- Ulmus crispa Willd.
  - Accepted Name: Ulmus rubra Muhl.
- Ulmus dalmatica Baldacci
  - Accepted Name: Ulmus minor Mill.
- Ulmus dampieri 'Wredei'
  - Accepted Name: Ulmus × hollandica 'Wredei'
- Ulmus dampieri var. wredei Juhlke
  - Accepted Name: Ulmus × hollandica 'Wredei'
- Ulmus davidiana var. japonica f. suberosa Nakai
  - Accepted Name: Ulmus × mesocarpa M. Kim & S. Lee
- Ulmus davidiana var. levigata C.K.Schneid
  - Accepted Name: Ulmus davidiana var. japonica (Rehder), Nakai
- Ulmus davidiana var. mandshurica Svorts.
  - Accepted name: Ulmus davidiana var. davidiana L. K. Fu
- Ulmus davidiana var. mandshurica var. pubescens Skvorts.
  - Accepted Name: Ulmus davidiana Planch.
- Ulmus davidiana var. pubescens Svorts.
  - Accepted name: Ulmus davidiana var. davidiana L. K. Fu
- Ulmus 'De Dumont'
  - Accepted Name: Ulmus × hollandica 'Dumont'
- Ulmus 'Delaware I'
  - Accepted Name: Ulmus 'Urban'
- Ulmus 'Delaware II'
  - Accepted Name: Ulmus americana 'Delaware'
- Ulmus densa Litv.
  - Accepted Name: Ulmus minor Mill.
- Ulmus densa var. bubyriana Späth
  - Accepted Name: Ulmus minor 'Umbraculifera'
- Ulmus dentata Raf.
  - Accepted Name: Ulmus americana L.
- Ulmus denudata Reichenbach
  - Accepted Name: Ulmus minor Mill.
- Ulmus dignatus
  - Accepted Name: ? (Nomen dubium)
- Ulmus dimidiata Raf.
  - Accepted Name: Ulmus rubra Muhl.
- Ulmus dippeliana f. muscaviensis C.K.Schneid.
  - Accepted Name: Ulmus × hollandica 'Muscaviensis'
- Ulmus divaricata C. H. Mull.
  - Accepted Name: Ulmus serotina Sarg.
- Ulmus diversifolia Melville
  - Accepted Name: Ulmus minor Mill.
- Ulmus dowei Baudriller
  - Accepted Name: Ulmus glabra 'Dovaei'
- Ulmus effusa Willd., Loudon, Willk., Fliche
  - Accepted Name: Ulmus laevis Pall,
- Ulmus effusa Sibth.
  - Accepted Name: Ulmus glabra Huds.
- Ulmus effusa rubescens Herder
  - Accepted Name: Ulmus laevis 'Colorans'
- Ulmus effusa f. aureo-variegata
  - Accepted Name: Ulmus laevis 'Aureo-Variegata'
- Ulmus effusa f. punctata Schelle
  - Accepted Name: Ulmus laevis 'Punctata'
- Ulmus elliptica Anon.
  - Accepted name: Ulmus rubra Muhl.
- Ulmus elliptica Koch
  - Accepted Name: Ulmus glabra Huds.
- Ulmus erosa sensu Wall.
  - Accepted Name: Ulmus wallichiana Planch.
- Ulmus erotina
  - Accepted Name: ? (Nomen dubium)
- Ulmus erythrocarpa W.C.Cheng
  - Accepted Name: Ulmus szechuanica Fang
- Ulmus excelsa Borkh.
  - Accepted Name: Ulmus glabra Huds.
- Ulmus exoniensis Hortr. ex. Loudon
  - Accepted Name: Ulmus 'Exoniensis'
- Ulmus expansa Rota
  - Accepted Name: Ulmus glabra Huds.
- Ulmus fastigiata Audibert
  - Accepted Name: Ulmus minor 'Stricta'
- Ulmus fastigiata Loudon
  - Accepted Name: Ulmus 'Exoniensis'
- Ulmus 'Fastigiata Aurea'
  - Accepted Name: Ulmus × hollandica 'Wredei'
- Ulmus 'Fastigiata Macrophylla'
  - Accepted Name: Ulmus glabra Huds.
- Ulmus 'Fastigiata Plumosa'
  - Accepted Name: Ulmus 'Exoniensis'
- Ulmus ferruginea W.C.Cheng
  - Accepted Name: Ulmus castaneifolia Hemsley
- Ulmus 'Field's New Hybrid Elm'
  - Accepted Name: Ulmus pumila 'Green King'
- Ulmus floridana Chapm.
  - Accepted Name: Ulmus americana L.
- Ulmus foliaceae Gilib., Sarg.
  - Accepted Name: Ulmus minor Mill.
- Ulmus foliaceae var. amplifolia
  - Accepted Name: Ulmus minor 'Amplifolia'
- Ulmus foliaceae var. umbraculifera (Trautv.) Rehder
  - Accepted Name: Ulmus minor 'Umbraculifera'
- Ulmus fordii Hort.
  - Accepted Name: Ulmus 'Exoniensis'
- Ulmus forficata Presl.
  - Accepted Name: ? Ulmus glabra ?
- Ulmus fulva Michx., Loudon, Bentley & Trimen, Sarg.
  - Accepted Name: Ulmus rubra Muhl.
- Ulmus fulva Hort. var. alba G.Kirchn.
  - Accepted Name: Ulmus × hollandica 'Alba'
- Ulmus fulva pendula Meehan
  - Accepted Name: Ulmus americana 'Beebe's Weeping'
- Ulmus fungosa Hort. ex. Dum. Cours.
  - Accepted Name: Ulmus minor Mill.
- Ulmus gallica A. Chev.
  - Accepted Name: ? (Nomen dubium)
- Ulmus georgica Schchian
  - Accepted Name: Ulmus minor Mill.
- Ulmus germanica Hartig.
  - Accepted Name: Ulmus minor Mill.
- Ulmus 'Giant'
  - Accepted Name: Ulmus × hollandica 'Vegeta'
- Ulmus 'Gigantea'
  - Accepted Name: Ulmus × hollandica 'Major'
- Ulmus glabra (NOT Huds.) Ley, Smith, Loudon, Rchb., Willk., C. K. Schneid.
  - Accepted Name: Ulmus minor Mill.
- Ulmus glabra viminalis
  - Accepted Name: Ulmus × viminalis Lodd.
- Ulmus glabra Mill. var. glandulosa Lindl.
  - Accepted Name: Ulmus minor 'Glandulosa'
- Ulmus glabra var. minor Ley
  - Accepted Name: Ulmus minor 'Plotii'
- Ulmus glabra var. scampstoniensis G.Kirchn.
  - Accepted Name: ?Ulmus × hollandica? 'Scampstoniensis'
- Ulmus glabra 'Bush'
  - Accepted Name: Ulmus glabra 'Nana'
- Ulmus glabra 'Cinerea'
  - Accepted Name: Ulmus glabra 'Nigra' or Ulmus × hollandica 'Cinerea'
- Ulmus glabra 'Exoniensis'
  - Accepted Name: Ulmus 'Exoniensis'
- Ulmus glandulosa Hort. ex Dippel
  - Accepted Name: Ulmus minor Mill.
- Ulmus glandulosa Lindley
  - Accepted Name: Ulmus minor 'Glandulosa'
- Ulmus globifera Hartig.
  - Accepted Name: Ulmus minor Mill.
- Ulmus glutinosa Willd.
  - Accepted Name: ? Ulmus glabra
- Ulmus gobicus Anon.
  - Accepted Name: Ulmus pumila L.
- Ulmus gracilis Hort. G.Kirchn.
  - Accepted Name: Ulmus × viminalis Lodd.
- Ulmus grandifolia Hayne
  - Accepted Name: Ulmus minor Mill.
- Ulmus grossheimii Takht.
  - Accepted Name: Ulmus minor Mill.
- Ulmus Heyderi Späth
  - Accepted Name: Ulmus rubra Muhl.
- Ulmus hillieri Hort.
  - Accepted Name: Ulmus × hollandica 'Hillieri'
- Ulmus hollandica var. angustifolia Weston
  - Accepted Name: Ulmus × hollandica 'Angustifolia'
- Ulmus hookeriana Planch.
  - Accepted Name: Ulmus lanceifolia Roxburgh ex Wall.
- Ulmus humilis Amman ex Steud.
  - Accepted Name: Ulmus pumila L.
- Ulmus huntingdonensis Dieck
  - Accepted Name: Ulmus × hollandica 'Vegeta' (Huntingdon Elm)
- Ulmus huntingdonii Hort. Rehder
  - Accepted Name: Ulmus × hollandica 'Vegeta' (Huntingdon Elm)
- Ulmus 'Ieplaan'
  - Accepted Name: Ulmus 'Den Haag'
- Ulmus inflexa (Hayne) Sloboda
  - Accepted Name: Ulmus glabra Huds.
- Ulmus integrifolia Roxb. in error.
  - Accepted Name: Holoptelea integrifolia (Roxb.) Planch. ('Indian Elm' "Ulmus integrifolia")
- Ulmus japonica (Rehder), Sarg.
  - Accepted Name: Ulmus davidiana var. japonica (Rehder), Nakai
- Ulmus japonica Sieber
  - Accepted Name: Ulmus parvifolia Jacquin
- Ulmus japonica var. levigata C.K.Schneid.
  - Accepted Name: Ulmus davidiana var. japonica (Rehder), Nakai
- Ulmus 'Klemmer Rouge'
  - Accepted Name: Ulmus 'Klemmer'
- Ulmus klemeri Späth
  - Accepted Name: Ulmus 'Klemmer'
- Ulmus koopmannii Späth
  - Accepted Name: ?Ulmus 'Koopmannii'
- Ulmus kunmingensis W.C.Cheng
  - Accepted Name: Ulmus changii var. kunmingensis W. C. Cheng
- Ulmus laciniata f. holophylla Nakai
  - Accepted Name: Ulmus laciniata (Trautv.), Mayr
- Ulmus laevigata Royle
  - Accepted Name: Ulmus villosa Brandis ex Gamble
- Ulmus laevis Hooker & Arnott
  - Accepted Name: Ulmus minor Mill.
- Ulmus laevis Pall. var. celtidea Rogow.
  - Accepted Name: Ulmus laevis Pall.
- Ulmus laevis Pall. var. simplicidens (E. Wolf) Grudz.
  - Accepted Name: Ulmus laevis Pall.
- Ulmus lancaeafolia Roxburgh & Wall.
  - Accepted Name: Ulmus lanceifolia Roxburgh ex Wall.
- Ulmus lancifolia Roxburgh
  - Accepted Name: Ulmus lanceifolia Roxburgh & Wall.
- Ulmus lasiophylla (C.K.Schneid.) W.C.Cheng
  - Accepted Name: Ulmus bergmanniana var. lasiophylla C.K.Schneid.
- Ulmus latifolia Persoon
  - Accepted Name: Ulmus minor Mill.
- Ulmus lesueurii Standl. in error
  - Accepted Name: Ostrya virginiana (Mill.) K. Koch
- Ulmus leucocarpa Schur.
  - Accepted Name: Ulmus glabra Huds.
- Ulmus libero-rubra Planch.
  - Accepted Name: Ulmus glabra 'Rubra'
- Ulmus Ludlow Elm
  - Accepted Name: Ulmus minor 'Glandulosa'
- Ulmus macrocarpa var. mandshurica Skvortsov
  - Accepted Name: Ulmus macrocarpa var. macrocarpa L. K. Fu
- Ulmus macrocarpa var. mongolica Liou & Li
  - Accepted Name: Ulmus macrocarpa var. macrocarpa L. K. Fu
- Ulmus macrocarpa var. nana Liou & Li
  - Accepted Name: Ulmus macrocarpa var. macrocarpa L. K. Fu
- Ulmus macrophylla Mill.
  - Accepted Name: Ulmus glabra Huds.
- Ulmus macrophylla Nakai
  - Accepted Name: Ulmus macrocarpa var. macrocarpa L. K. Fu
- Ulmus major Sm.
  - Accepted Name: Ulmus glabra Huds.
- Ulmus major Hohen. var. heterophylla Maxim.
  - Accepted Name: Ulmus laciniata (Trautv.), Mayr
- Ulmus major Hollandica, angustis & magis acuminatis sammaris, folio latissimo scabro, eleganter variegato Mill.
  - Accepted Name: Ulmus × hollandica 'Eleganto-Variegata'
- Ulmus major var. daveyi Henry
  - Accepted Name: Ulmus × hollandica 'Daveyi'
- Ulmus 'Malines'
  - Accepted Name: Ulmus minor 'Latifolia'
- Ulmus manshurica Nakai
  - Accepted Name: Ulmus pumila L.
- Ulmus 'Masters's Twiggy'
  - Accepted Name: Ulmus × viminalis Lodd.
- Ulmus media Melville
  - Accepted Name: Ulmus minor Mill.
- Ulmus micrantha Kitt.
  - Accepted Name: Ulmus minor Mill.
- Ulmus microphylla Mill.
  - Accepted Name: Ulmus minor Mill.
- Ulmus microphylla Pers.
  - Accepted Name: Ulmus minor Mill.
- Ulmus microphylla pendula G.Kirchn.
  - Accepted Name: Ulmus minor 'Sarniensis'
- Ulmus Midlands Elm
  - Accepted Name: Ulmus × hollandica 'Elegantissima' Horw.
- Ulmus minor foliis flavescentibus Mill.
  - Accepted Name: Ulmus 'Louis van Houtte'
- Ulmus minor subsp. canescens (Melville) Browicz & Ziel.
  - Accepted Name: Ulmus minor Mill.
- Ulmus minor Mill. subsp. angustifolia (Weston) Stace
  - Accepted name: Ulmus minor 'Stricta'
- Ulmus minor var. cornubiensis Richens
  - Accepted Name: Ulmus minor 'Stricta'
- Ulmus minor Mill. var. goodyeri Melville
  - Accepted name: Ulmus minor 'Goodyeri'
- Ulmus minor var. suberosa (Moench) Rehder
  - Accepted Name: Ulmus minor Mill.
- Ulmus minor var. vulgaris Richens
  - Accepted Name: Ulmus minor 'Atinia'
- Ulmus minor subsp. minor Richens
  - Accepted name: Ulmus minor Mill.
- Ulmus minor subsp. plotii (Mill.) Richens
  - Accepted name: Ulmus minor 'Plotii'
- Ulmus minor subsp. sarniensis Stace
  - Accepted name: Ulmus minor 'Sarniensis'
- Ulmus minor 'Cochleata' Cornelis de Vos
  - Accepted Name: Ulmus minor 'Cucullata'
- Ulmus minor 'Italica'
  - Accepted Name: Ulmus 'Australis'
- Ulmus minor 'Koopmannii'
  - Accepted Name: Ulmus 'Koopmannii'
- Ulmus minor 'Webbiana'
  - Accepted Name: Ulmus 'Webbiana'
- Ulmus modiolina Dum. Cours.
  - Accepted Name: Ulmus × hollandica 'Modiolina'
- Ulmus mollifolia Marshall
  - Accepted Name: Ulmus americana L.
- Ulmus montana Stokes, Smith, Loudon, Mathieu, With.
  - Accepted Name: Ulmus glabra Huds.
- Ulmus montana fastigiata Loudon
  - Accepted Name: Ulmus 'Exoniensis'
- Ulmus montana atropurpurea Späth
  - Accepted Name: Ulmus glabra 'Atropurpurea'
- Ulmus montana lutescens van Houttei Schelle (in error)
  - Accepted Name: Ulmus 'Louis van Houtte'
- Ulmus montana pendula nova Hort.
  - Accepted Name: Ulmus glabra 'Camperdownii'
- Ulmus montana viminalis marmorata Hort. Schelle
  - Accepted Name: Ulmus × viminalis Lodd.
- Ulmus montana var. australis Hort. Loudon
  - Accepted Name: Ulmus 'Australis'
- Ulmus montana var. belgica
  - Accepted Name: Ulmus × hollandica 'Belgica'
- Ulmus montana var. corylifolia Zapal.
  - Accepted Name: Ulmus glabra 'Cornuta'
- Ulmus montana var. dauvessei G.Nicholson
  - Accepted Name: Ulmus × hollandica 'Dauvessei'
- Ulmus montana var. decumbens W.Mast.
  - Accepted Name: Ulmus glabra 'Horizontalis'
- Ulmus montana var. etrusca G.Nicholson
  - Accepted Name: Ulmus × elegantissima
- Ulmus montana var. fastigiata aurea Hort. G.Nicholson
  - Accepted Name: Ulmus × hollandica 'Wredei'
- Ulmus montana var. gigantea Hort. Kirchner
  - Accepted Name: Ulmus × hollandica 'Major'
- Ulmus montana var. laciniata Trautv.
  - Accepted Name: Ulmus laciniata (Trautv.), Mayr
- Ulmus montana var. macrophylla aurea Bean
  - Accepted Name: Ulmus × hollandica 'Macrophylla Aurea'
- Ulmus montana var. macrophylla fastigiata Hort. G.Nicholson
  - Accepted Name: ?Ulmus × hollandica 'Major'
- Ulmus montana var. major W.Mast.
  - Accepted Name: Ulmus × hollandica 'Superba'
- Ulmus montana var. pendula Lodd.
  - Accepted Name: Ulmus glabra 'Horizontalis'
- Ulmus montana var. pendula G.Kirchn.
  - Accepted Name: Ulmus glabra 'Camperdownii'
- Ulmus montana var. pendula camperdownii Hort.
  - Accepted Name: Ulmus glabra 'Camperdownii'
- Ulmus montana var. pendula macrophylla Maxwell
  - Accepted Name: Ulmus glabra 'Pendula Macrophylla'
- Ulmus montana var. pendula variegata Hort.
  - Accepted Name: Ulmus glabra 'Pendula Variegata'
- Ulmus montana var. pyramidalis Lavallée
  - Accepted Name: Ulmus × hollandica 'Dampieri'
- Ulmus montana var. ramulosa Booth
  - Accepted Name: Ulmus glabra 'Ramulosa'
- Ulmus montana var. rugosa W.Mast.
  - Accepted Name: Ulmus glabra 'Rugosa'
- Ulmus montana var. smithii Hort.
  - Accepted Name: Ulmus × hollandica 'Smithii'
- Ulmus montana var. superba Morren
  - Accepted Name: Ulmus × hollandica 'Superba'
- Ulmus montana var. variegata Loudon
  - Accepted Name: Ulmus glabra 'Albo-Variegata'
- Ulmus montana f. fastigiata plumosa Hort. Schelle
  - Accepted Name: Ulmus 'Exoniensis'
- Ulmus montana 'Parasol'
  - Accepted Name: Ulmus glabra 'Horizontalis'
- Ulmus montana 'Pendula'
  - Accepted Name: Ulmus glabra 'Horizontalis'
- Ulmus monterreyensis Mull.
  - Accepted Name: Ulmus crassifolia Nutt.
- Ulmus 'Monument'
  - Accepted Name: Ulmus minor 'Sarniensis'
- Ulmus monumentalis Rinzer ex Dippel
  - Accepted Name: Ulmus minor Mill.
- Ulmus Mulberry-leafed Elm
  - Accepted name: Ulmus minor Mill.
- Ulmus multinervis W.C.Cheng
  - Accepted Name: Ulmus castaneifolia Hemsley
- Ulmus multinervosa C.H.Mull.
  - Accepted Name: Ulmus serotina Sarg.
- Ulmus myrtifolia purpurea de Smet
  - Accepted Name: Ulmus minor 'Purpurascens'
- Ulmus nana Borckh.
  - Accepted Name: Ulmus minor Mill.
- Ulmus nemoralis Ait. in error
  - Accepted Name: Zelkova carpinifolia (Pall.) Dippel
- Ulmus nemorosa Borckh.
  - Accepted Name: Ulmus minor Mill.
- Ulmus 'Neosho'
  - Accepted Name: Ulmus pumila 'Green King'
- Ulmus nepalensis Anon. (nomen dubium)
  - Accepted Name: ?
- Ulmus nitens Moench
  - Accepted Name: Ulmus minor Mill.
- Ulmus nitens var. hunnybunii Moss
  - Accepted Name: Ulmus minor 'Hunnybunii'
- Ulmus nitens var. pendula Rehder
  - Accepted Name: Ulmus minor Mill.
- Ulmus nitens var. sowerbyi Moss
  - Accepted Name: Ulmus minor 'Sowerbyi'
- Ulmus nitens var. wheatleyi Simon-Louis
  - Accepted Name: Ulmus minor 'Sarniensis'
- Ulmus nitida Beldie
  - Accepted Name: Ulmus minor Mill.
- Ulmus nuda Ehrh.
  - Accepted Name: Ulmus glabra Huds.
- Ulmus obovata Raf.
  - Accepted Name: Ulmus americana L.
- Ulmus oblongata Koch, (Hayne) Sloboda
  - Accepted Name: Ulmus glabra 'Oblongata'
- Ulmus oblongoovata Simkovics
  - Accepted Name: Ulmus minor Mill.
- Ulmus orbiculariovata Simkovics
  - Accepted Name: Ulmus minor Mill.
- Ulmus octandra Schkuhr
  - Accepted Name: Ulmus laevis Pall.
- Ulmus 'Ohio Hybrid'
  - Accepted Name: Ulmus 'Urban'
- Ulmus ontariensis Hort. ex. Steud.
  - Accepted Name: ? (Nomen dubium)
- Ulmus opaca Nutt.
  - Accepted Name: Ulmus crassifolia Nutt.
- Ulmus ovata
  - Accepted Name: ? (Nomen dubium)
- Ulmus parvifolia Hayne
  - Accepted Name: Ulmus minor Mill.
- Ulmus parvifolia Lindley
  - Accepted Name: Ulmus minor Mill.
- Ulmus parvifolia Maxim., Franch. et Savatier, Forbes & Hemsl., Shiras.
  - Accepted Name: Ulmus parvifolia Jacq.
- Ulmus parvifolia corticosa
  - Accepted Name: Ulmus parvifolia 'Cork Bark'
- Ulmus parvifolia f. pendens
  - Accepted Name: Ulmus parvifolia 'Pendens'
- Ulmus parvifolia f. sempervirens
  - Accepted Name: Ulmus parvifolia 'Pendens'
- Ulmus parvifolia 'Brea'
  - Accepted Name: Ulmus parvifolia 'Drake'
- Ulmus parvifolia 'Evergreen'
  - Accepted Name: Ulmus parvifolia 'Sempervirens'
- Ulmus parvifolia 'Microphylla'
  - Accepted Name: Ulmus parvifolia 'Hokkaido'
- Ulmus parvifolia 'Pygmaea'
  - Accepted Name: Ulmus parvifolia 'Hokkaido'
- Ulmus parvifolia 'True Green'
  - Accepted Name: Ulmus parvifolia 'Sempervirens'
- Ulmus pedunculata Foug.
  - Accepted Name: Ulmus laevis Pall.
- Ulmus pedunculata Foug. var. erubescens Elwes
  - Accepted Name: Ulmus laevis 'Colorans'
- Ulmus pendula W.Mast. NOT Willd.
  - Accepted Name: Ulmus × hollandica 'Smithii'
- Ulmus pendula Willd.
  - Accepted Name: Ulmus americana L.
- Ulmus pendulina Sinclair
  - Accepted Name: Ulmus glabra 'Horizontalis'
- Ulmus petropolitana Gdgr.
  - Accepted Name: Ulmus laevis Pall.
- Ulmus pilifera Borbás
  - Accepted Name: Ulmus minor 'Atinia'
- Ulmus pinguis Raf.
  - Accepted Name: Ulmus rubra Muhl.
- Ulmus pinnato-ramosa Dieck
  - Accepted Name: Ulmus pumila 'Turkestan'
- Ulmus pinnato-ramosa f. aurescens Dieck
  - Accepted Name: Ulmus pumila 'Aurescens'
- Ulmus pitteursii pendula C. de Vos in error.
  - Accepted Name: Zelkova × verschaffeltii
- Ulmus plotii Druce
  - Accepted Name: Ulmus minor 'Plotii'
- Ulmus planifolia Hort. ex Loudon
  - Accepted Name: Ulmus 'Planifolia'
- Ulmus plumosa C. de Vos
  - Accepted Name: Ulmus 'Exoniensis'
- Ulmus plumosa foliis variegatis C. de Vos
  - Accepted Name: Ulmus 'Exoniensis'
- Ulmus pluridensis Andronov
  - Accepted Name: Ulmus minor Mill.
- Ulmus plurinerva
  - Accepted Name: ? (Nomen dubium)
- Ulmus podolica (Wilcz.) Klok.
  - Accepted Name: Ulmus glabra Huds.
- Ulmus podolica Zapal.
  - Accepted Name: Ulmus minor Mill.
- Ulmus polygama in error
  - Accepted Name: Zelkova carpinifolia
- Ulmus popovii Giga.
  - Accepted Name: Ulmus glabra Huds.
- Ulmus praestans Schoch
  - Accepted Name: Ulmus × hollandica 'Superba'
- Ulmus 'Primus'
  - Accepted Name: Ulmus 'Improved Coolshade'
- Ulmus procera 'Christine Buisman'
  - Accepted Name: Ulmus minor 'Christine Buisman'
- Ulmus procera 'Silvery Gem'
  - Accepted Name: Ulmus 'Silvery Gem'
- Ulmus procera propendens (Lombarts)
  - Accepted Name: ?Ulmus × hollandica or Ulmus minor? 'Lombartsii'
- Ulmus propinqua Koidz.
  - Accepted Name: Ulmus davidiana var. japonica (Rehder), Nakai
- Ulmus pseudosuberosa Blocki
  - Accepted Name: Ulmus minorMill.
- Ulmus pubescens Popichal
  - Accepted Name: Ulmus minor Mill.
- Ulmus pubescens Sudw., Pinchot
  - Accepted Name: Ulmus rubra Muhl.
- Ulmus pubescens Walter
  - Accepted Name: Ulmus americana L.
- Ulmus pumila Pallas NOT L.
  - Accepted Name: Ulmus minorMill.
- Ulmus pumila Walter NOT L.
  - Accepted Name: Ulmus alata Michx.
- Ulmus pumila f. androssowii
  - Accepted Name: Ulmus × androssowii R. Kam
- Ulmus pumila var. genuina Skvort.
  - Accepted Name: Ulmus pumila L.
- Ulmus pumila var. microphylla Pers.
  - Accepted Name: Ulmus pumila L.
- Ulmus pumila var. pilosa Rehder
  - Accepted Name: Ulmus chumlia Melville & Heybroek
- Ulmus pumila var. pinnato-ramosa A.Henry
  - Accepted Name: Ulmus pumila 'Turkestan'
- Ulmus pumila var. transbaicalensis Pallas
  - Accepted Name: Ulmus pumila L.
- Ulmus pumila 'Den Haag'
  - Accepted Name: Ulmus × 'Den Haag'
- Ulmus pumila 'Lincoln'
  - Accepted Name: Ulmus × 'Lincoln'
- Ulmus pumila 'Siber-Ansaloni'
  - Accepted Name: Ulmus pumila 'Ansaloni'
- Ulmus pyramidalis C. de Vos
  - Accepted Name: Ulmus minor 'Stricta'
- Ulmus racemosa Borkh.
  - Accepted Name: Ulmus laevis Pall.
- Ulmus racemosa Thomas
  - Accepted Name: Ulmus thomasii Sarg.
- Ulmus reticulata Dumrt.
  - Accepted Name: Ulmus laevis Pall.
- Ulmus rosseelsii Hort. ex Dippel
  - Accepted Name: Ulmus minorMill.
- Ulmus rotundata (Hayne) Sloboda
  - Accepted Name: ? (Nomen dubium)
- Ulmus rotundifolia Carriere
  - Accepted Name: ? Ulmus macrocarpa ?
- Ulmus sarniensis Bancs., C.K.Schneid., Lodd., Boom
  - Accepted Name: Ulmus minor 'Sarniensis'
- Ulmus sativa Mill. NOT Moss
  - Accepted Name: Ulmus minor 'Atinia'
- Ulmus sativa Moss
  - Accepted Name: Ulmus minor 'Plotii'
- Ulmus sativa Mill. var. lockii Druce
  - Accepted Name: Ulmus minor 'Plotii'
- Ulmus sativa pendula C. de Vos
  - Accepted Name: Ulmus minor 'Pendula'
- Ulmus scabra Mill., C.K.Schneid., Ley, Asch. & Graebn.
  - Accepted Name: Ulmus glabra Huds.
- Ulmus scabra purpurea corylifolia Dieck
  - Accepted Name: Ulmus glabra 'Corylifolia Purpurea'
- Ulmus scabra purpurea nigricans Dieck
  - Accepted Name: Ulmus glabra 'Latifolia Nigricans' Pynaert
- Ulmus scabra viminalis gracilis Hort. Dieck
  - Accepted Name: Ulmus × viminalis Lodd.
- Ulmus scabra viminalis pulverulenta Hort. Dieck, Dippel
  - Accepted Name: Ulmus × viminalis Lodd.
- Ulmus scampstoniensis pendula Petz.
  - Accepted Name: Ulmus glabra 'Camperdownii'
- Ulmus scotica Gdgr.
  - Accepted Name: Ulmus glabra Huds.
- Ulmus sepearia Dumort.
  - Accepted Name: Ulmus minor Mill.
- Ulmus shirasawana Daveau
  - Accepted Name: Ulmus parvifolia Jacq.
- Ulmus sibirica Hort. Lavallée
  - Accepted Name: Ulmus pumila 'Pendula'
- Ulmus sieboldii Daveau
  - Accepted Name: Ulmus parvifolia Jacq.
- Ulmus sieboldii f. shirawasana (Daveau) Nakai
  - Accepted Name: Ulmus parvifolia Jacq.
- Ulmus simplicidens E. Wolf
  - Accepted Name: Ulmus laevis Pall.
- Ulmus smithii Henry
  - Accepted Name: Ulmus × hollandica 'Smithii'
- Ulmus sparsa Dumort.
  - Accepted Name: Ulmus minor Mill.
- Ulmus striata Bosc.
  - Accepted Name: ? (Nomen dubium)
- Ulmus stricta Aiton
  - Accepted Name: Ulmus minor Mill.
- Ulmus stricta Lindley
  - Accepted Name: Ulmus minor 'Stricta'
- Ulmus stricta Loudon
  - Accepted Name: Ulmus minor Mill.
- Ulmus stricta microphylla Lodd.
  - Accepted Name: Ulmus × hollandica 'Microphylla'
- Ulmus suberosa Moench.
  - Accepted Name: Ulmus minor Mill.
- Ulmus suberosa Smith, Loudon, Lindley
  - Accepted Name: Ulmus minor 'Atinia'
- Ulmus suberosa Michx.
  - Accepted Name: Ulmus glabra Huds.
- Ulmus suberosa betuloides Hort. G.Kirchn.
  - Accepted Name: Ulmus × viminalis Lodd.
- Ulmus suberosa fastigiata Audibert
  - Accepted Name: Ulmus minor 'Stricta'
- Ulmus suberosa oxoniensis Audibert
  - Accepted Name: Ulmus 'Exoniensis'
- Ulmus suberosa pendula Lombartii (Floralia, 1920)
  - Accepted Name: ?Ulmus × hollandica or Ulmus minor? 'Lombartsii'
- Ulmus suberosa pendula Lombartsi (Lombarts Nursery)
  - Accepted Name: ?Ulmus × hollandica or Ulmus minor? 'Lombartsii'
- Ulmus suberosa tricolor C. de Vos
  - Accepted Name: Ulmus × hollandica 'Tricolor'
- Ulmus suberosa var. lanuginosa Lavallée
  - Accepted Name: Ulmus minor 'Lanuginosa'
- Ulmus sukaczevii Andronov
  - Accepted Name: Ulmus glabra Huds.
- Ulmus superba A. Henry
  - Accepted Name: Ulmus × hollandica 'Superba'
- Ulmus surculosa Stokes
  - Accepted Name: Ulmus minor 'Atinia'
- Ulmus surculosa argutifolia Stokes
  - Accepted Name: Ulmus minor 'Plotii'
- Ulmus surculosa Stokes var. latifolia Stokes, Ley
  - Accepted Name: Ulmus minor 'Atinia'
- Ulmus taihangshanensis S.Y.Wang
  - Accepted Name: Ulmus lamellosa Wang & S.L.Chang
- Ulmus tetrandra Schuhr
  - Accepted Name: Ulmus minor Mill.
- Ulmus 'Thornhill'
  - Accepted Name: Ulmus 'Morton' = Accolade
- Ulmus tiliaefolia (or tilliifolia) Host
  - Accepted Name: Ulmus glabra 'Tiliaefolia'
- Ulmus tomentosa G.Kirchn.
  - Accepted Name: Ulmus glabra 'Tomentosa'
- Ulmus tonkinensis Gagnep.
  - Accepted Name: Ulmus lanceifolia Roxburgh ex Wall.
- Ulmus 'Tortillard'
  - Accepted Name: Ulmus × hollandica 'Modiolina'
- Ulmus tortuosa Host
  - Accepted Name: Ulmus minor 'Tortuosa'
- Ulmus transbaicalensis Steud.
  - Accepted name: Ulmus pumila L.
- Ulmus tricuspis Hort. ex Starcs
  - Accepted Name: Ulmus glabra Huds.
- Ulmus tridens Hort. ex. Dippel
  - Accepted Name: Ulmus glabra Huds.
- Ulmus triserrata Hort. ex Dippel
  - Accepted Name: Ulmus glabra 'Cornuta'
- Ulmus turkestanica Regel
  - Accepted Name: Ulmus minor 'Umbraculifera'
- Ulmus urnii (Siebenthaler Co. Cat.)
  - Accepted Name: Ulmus americana 'Vase'
- Ulmus urticaefolia Audibert
  - Accepted Name: Ulmus glabra 'Crispa'
- Ulmus urticaefolia Jacques
  - Accepted Name: Ulmus laevis 'Urticaefolia'
- Ulmus uzbekistanica Drob.
  - Accepted Name: Ulmus minor Mill.
- Ulmus vaseyi Bailey & Bailey
  - Accepted Name: Ulmus americana 'Vase'
- Ulmus vegeta Ley
  - Accepted Name: Ulmus × hollandica 'Vegeta'
- Ulmus viminalis pendula W.Mast.
  - Accepted Name: Ulmus × viminalis Lodd.
- Ulmus virens Hort. ex Dippel
  - Accepted Name: Ulmus minor Mill.
- Ulmus virens W.Mast.
  - Accepted Name: Ulmus × hollandica 'Virens'
- Ulmus virgata Roxburgh
  - Accepted Name: Ulmus parvifolia Jacq.
- Ulmus virgata Wallich. ex. Planch.
  - Accepted Name: Ulmus chumlia Melville & Heybroek
- Ulmus viscosa Audibert, Lodd., Loudon
  - Accepted Name: Ulmus × hollandica 'Viscosa'
- Ulmus vulgaris Aiton
  - Accepted Name: Ulmus minor Mill.
- Ulmus vulgaris Pallas
  - Accepted Name: Ulmus minor Mill.
- Ulmus wallichiana Brandis, Hooker
  - Accepted Name: Ulmus wallichiana Planch.
- Ulmus webbiana Lee ex K. Koch
  - Accepted Name: Ulmus 'Webbiana'
- Ulmus wentworthii pendula C. de Vos
  - Accepted Name: Ulmus 'Wentworthii'
- Ulmus 'Wheatley'
  - Accepted Name: Ulmus minor 'Sarniensis'
- Ulmus wheatleyii Druce
  - Accepted Name: Ulmus minor 'Sarniensis'
- Ulmus wilsoniana C.K.Schneid.
  - Accepted Name: Ulmus davidiana var. japonica (Rehder), Nakai
- Ulmus wilsoniana Litw. var. subhirsuta (C.K.Schneid.), P.H.Huang, F.Y.Cao, & L.H.Zhuo
  - Accepted Name: Ulmus chumlia Melville & Heybroek
- Ulmus wilsoniana C.K.Schneid. 'Prospector'
  - Accepted Name: Ulmus davidiana var. japonica 'Prospector'
- Ulmus wreedi aurea Leach
  - Accepted Name: Ulmus × hollandica 'Wredei'
- Ulmus wyssotzky Kotov.
  - Accepted Name: Ulmus minor Mill.
- Ulmus xanthochondra Beck von Mannagette
  - Accepted Name: Ulmus minor Mill.
- Ulmus 'Ypreau'
  - Accepted Name: Ulmus × hollandica 'Ypreau'
- Ulmus × hollandica var. belgica
  - Accepted Name: Ulmus × hollandica 'Belgica'
- Ulmus × hollandica var. vegeta sensu Rehder
  - Accepted Name: Ulmus × hollandica 'Vegeta'
- Ulmus × hollandica 'Hollandica'
  - Accepted Name: Ulmus × hollandica 'Major'
- Ulmus × hollandica 'Christine Buisman'
  - Accepted Name: Ulmus minor 'Christine Buisman'
- Ulmus × vegeta Loud.
  - Accepted Name: Ulmus × hollandica 'Vegeta'
