= Green King =

Green King may refer to:

- Greene King, British pub chain and brewer
- Ulmus pumila 'Green King', an elm tree cultivar
- Green King, a fictional character in The Moon Stallion children's TV serial
- Green King, a K character
