= Ulmus 'Ramulosa' =

Elm cultivar

- Cultivar: 'Ramulosa'
- Origin: Germany

The elm cultivar Ulmus 'Ramulosa' [: 'twiggy'], Floetbeck elm, was raised in the Floetbeck (or Flottbeck) nurseries, Hamburg, by James Booth & Son (a principal supplier of continental elms to the UK, considered by Loudon the finest nursery in Germany), and was first mentioned by Loudon in Arboretum et Fruticetum Britannicum (1838) as Ulmus montana glabra var. ramulosa Booth, but without description. It does not, however, appear in Booth's 1838 list. Loudon listed the tree in a group including Downton Elm, Scampston Elm, and Ludlow Elm, so Green's wych cultivar attribution (Ulmus glabra Huds.) appears to be an error.

== Description ==
Not available.

== Cultivation ==
No specimens are known to survive. Loudon mentions that there were specimens present in the original Horticultural Society Garden, London.
