= Ulmus 'Virens' =

Elm cultivar

- Genus: Ulmus
- Cultivar: 'Virens'
- Origin: England

The cultivar Ulmus 'Virens', the Kidbrook Elm, is an elm of unknown origin. It was first identified by Masters as U. virens in Hortus Duroverni 67, 1831, and later by Loudon in Arboretum et Fruticetum Britannicum, 3: 1376, 1838, as U. campestris (: minor) virens. Described in some detail by Elwes & Henry (1913) as a form of Field Elm but classified as U. × hollandica by Green, the tree is not mentioned in Bean's classic works on British trees.

== Description ==
The tree is distinguished by an upspreading crown, in mild winters retaining its foliage into December (Loudon called it "almost evergreen"). The leaves are oval, < 10 cm long by < 5 cm wide, long acuminate at the apex, and coarsely biserrate; the bark a distinctive red. The flowers are similar to those of Huntingdon Elm; the samarae are similar but smaller. Loudon thought the tree of possible Cornish origin, perhaps on account of its straight trunk, ascending branches and foliage, dark green until late in the year.

== Pests and diseases ==
'Virens' is susceptible to Dutch elm disease.

== Cultivation ==
The Kidbrook Elm was reputed to have grown well on chalky soils, but its shoots were said to be vulnerable to autumn frosts. Henry recalls seeing only one specimen, at Ashwell Bury near Baldock, which he found resembled the Huntingdon Elm in many respects. A specimen leaf-spray and samarae from the Ashwell Bury tree are held in the Kew Herbarium. 'Virens' appeared in Thompson & Watson's Gardener's Assistant (London 1901), but by then it was rare. "I have been trying to get 'Virens'," wrote Frederic Inman, Vice President of the Bath Natural History Society, in 1902, "which is very highly spoken of by Selby and Loudon; it is stated to be almost evergreen, but Mr. Veitch cannot procure it." Henry reported it apparently "unknown in nurseries" at the time of writing his 1913 work. The reasons for its disappearance at the height of the elm vogue are unknown.

== Notable trees ==
Loudon reported a fine specimen in the Horticultural Society Garden, named U. montana nodosa (:'knotty').

== Etymology ==
The cultivar name 'Virens' is Latin for 'green'. The tree was named for the village of Kidbrook in Sussex, England, but the association with that place remains obscure.

== Accessions ==
Europe

- Grange Farm Arboretum, Lincolnshire, Acc. no. 1148.

== Synonymy ==
- Ulmus campestris virens: Loudon, Arboretum et Fruticetum Britannicum, 3: 1376, 1838.
- Ulmus × hollandica 'Virens': Green,
- Ulmus virens: Masters, Hortus Duroverni 66, 1831.
