= Ulmus americana 'Littleford' =

Elm cultivar

- Species: Ulmus americana
- Cultivar: 'Littleford'
- Origin: Illinois, US

The American elm cultivar Ulmus americana 'Littleford' was cloned from a tree in Hinsdale, Illinois, circa 1915 by Littleford Nurseries of Downers Grove, Illinois, and first released in 1927. It was marketed in the 1930s by nearby Hinsdale Nurseries, successor to Littleford Nurseries, as 'Littlefordii'. In their 1925 catalogue Littleford Nurseries had written of their selection: "The growing of the American elm is a specialty with us; we consider it the leading shade and ornamental tree. Our trees are a selected strain of the V-shaped type, a stock of 15 to 20 thousand, all 2 ins. and up in size, transplanted twice and in splendid vigor for planting".

== Description ==
The tree is narrowly vase-shaped, without pendulous branchlets, and with larger and heavier leaves.

== Pests and diseases ==
The clone's resistance to Dutch elm disease is not known, but the species as a whole is highly susceptible to the disease and elm yellows; it is also moderately preferred for feeding and reproduction by the adult elm leaf beetle Xanthogaleruca luteola, and highly preferred for feeding by the Japanese beetle Popillia japonica in the United States. U. americana is also the most susceptible of all the elms to verticillium wilt.

== Cultivation ==
'Littleford' was also marketed from the 1930s by the Siebenthaler Company of Dayton, Ohio, and from the 1940s by Charles Fiore Nurseries of Prairie View, Illinois. The Sherman Nursery, Charles City, Iowa, stocked it as late as 1957, but it is no longer listed by that emporium or any other. The tree is not known to have been introduced to Europe or Australasia.

== Synonymy ==
- Ulmus americana var. Littlefordii: Bailey & Bailey, Hortus Second, 746, 747, 1941.

== Accessions ==
North America

- Morton Arboretum, US. Acc. no. 862–43.
