= Ulmus macrocarpa var. macrocarpa =

Scientific classification
- Kingdom: Plantae
- Clade: Tracheophytes
- Clade: Angiosperms
- Clade: Eudicots
- Clade: Rosids
- Order: Rosales
- Family: Ulmaceae
- Genus: Ulmus
- Species: U. macrocarpa Hance
- Variety: U. m. var. macrocarpa

Trinomial name
- Ulmus macrocarpa var. macrocarpa

Synonyms
- Ulmus macrocarpa var. mandshurica Skvortsov; Ulmus macrocarpa var. mongolica Liou & Li; Ulmus macrocarpa var. nana Liou & Li; Ulmus macrophylla Nakai

Variety of tree

Ulmus macrocarpa var. macrocarpa L. K. Fu is found on hillslopes and in valleys at elevations of 700–800 m in the Chinese provinces of Anhui, Gansu, Hebei, Heilongjiang, Henan, Hubei, Jiangsu, Jilin, Liaoning, Nei Mongol, eastern Qinghai, Shaanxi, Shanxi, Shandong. Beyond China it is also found in Korea, Mongolia, and Russia (Siberia).

Fu sank Ulmus taihangshanensis S.Y.Wang as a synonym for this variety, but U. taihangshanensis, as described from Henan, differs in having more pubescent twigs which never develop corky wings, and thinner leaves (papery rather than leathery).. U. taihangshanensis has more recently been sunk as a synonym of Ulmus lamellosa.

== Description ==
The tree is distinguished by a "leaf blade abaxially sparsely pubescent, adaxially hirsute or with convex trichome scars, base attenauted to rounded, apex shortly caudate. Samara pubescent, apically concave or rounded, wings thick, stigmas pubescent. Fl. Mar., fr., Apr."

== Pests and diseases ==
No information available.

== Cultivation ==
The tree is very rare in cultivation beyond Asia.

== Accessions ==
Europe

- Grange Farm Arboretum, Lincolnshire, UK. Grafted tree acquired 2013, acc. no. not known.
