= Ulmus 'Tiliaefolia' =

Elm cultivar

- Genus: Ulmus
- Cultivar: 'Tiliaefolia'
- Origin: Europe

The Elm cultivar Ulmus 'Tiliaefolia' was first mentioned by Host in Flora Austriaca (1827), as Ulmus tiliaefolia [:linden-leaved]. The Späth nursery of Berlin distributed a 'Tiliaefolia' from the late 19th century to the 1930s as neither an U. montana hybrid nor a field elm (U. campestris) cultivar, but simply as Ulmus tiliaefolia, suggesting uncertainty about its status. Herbarium specimens appear to show two clones, one smaller-leaved and classified as a field elm cultivar, the other larger-leaved.

== Description ==
The tree was said to have ovate leaves, rounded or subcordate and not usually strongly oblique at the base. Host said the leaf was biserrate. The catalogue of the Späth nursery, Berlin, describes 'Tiliifolia' [:'Tiliaefolia'] as having smooth shiny dark green leaves.

== Pests and diseases ==
'Tiliaefolia' is not known to have any resistance to Dutch elm disease.

== Cultivation ==
No examples of 'Tiliaefolia' are known to survive. Reichenbach noted briefly that the tree was once grown in Bohemia and Austria. One tree was planted in 1898, as U. tiliifolia, at the Dominion Arboretum, Ottawa, Canada. Three specimens were supplied by the Späth nursery to the Royal Botanic Garden Edinburgh in 1902 as U. tiliaefolia, and may still exist in Edinburgh as it was the practice of the Garden to distribute trees about the city (viz. the Wentworth Elm); the current list of Living Accessions held in the Garden per se does not list the plant. A specimen obtained from Späth before 1914, and planted in 1916, stood in the Ryston Hall arboretum, Norfolk, in the early 20th century. A 'Tiliaefolia', classified as a field elm U. foliacea Gilib. by Christine Buisman, was present in The Hague in the 1930s.

=== Putative specimens ===
A tree with leaves matching herbarium specimens of 'Tiliaefolia' stood in Dyke Road, Brighton, till 2012.

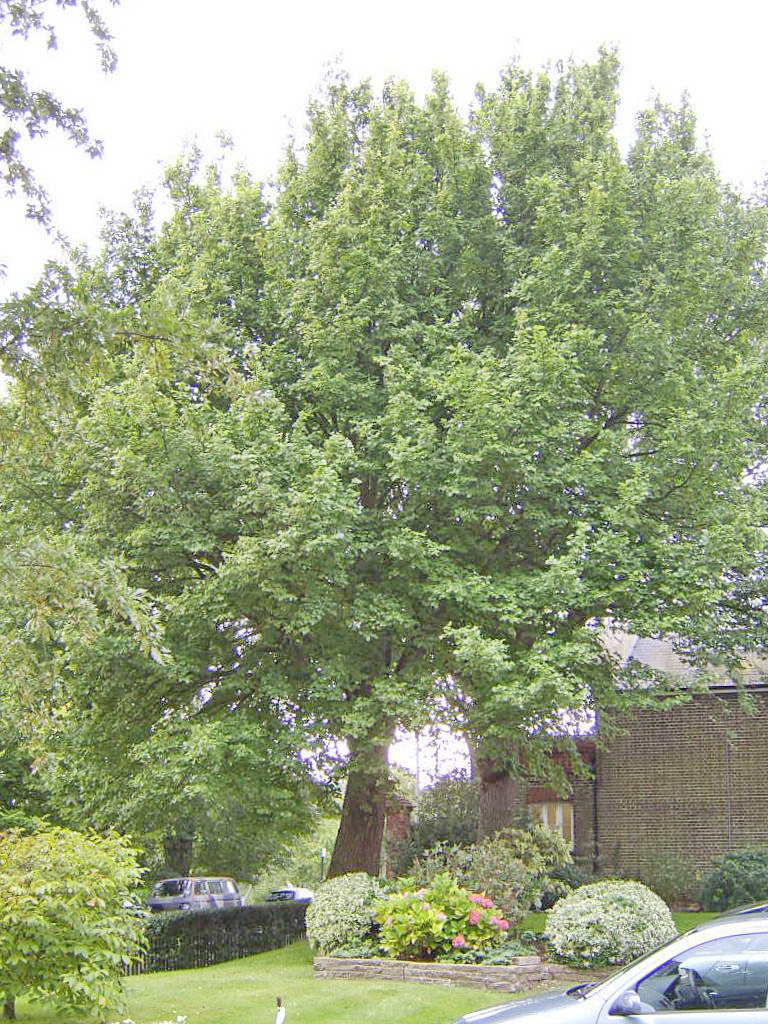
Dyke Road elm, Brighton (before 2012)

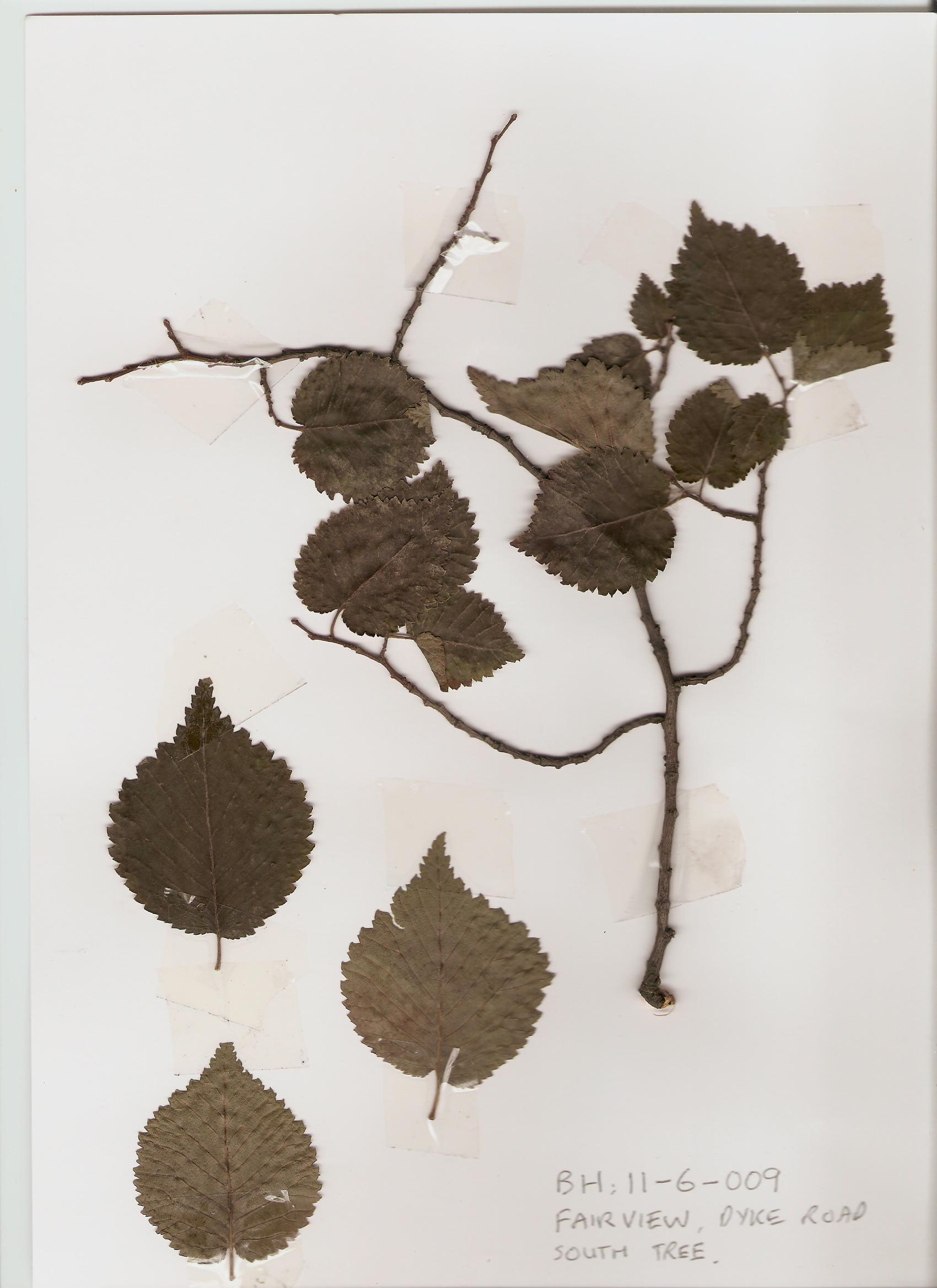
Leaves from Dyke Road, Brighton (2009)

An old elm with leaves close to herbarium specimens of Späth's 'Tiliaefolia', stands (2016) in Belgrave Crescent Gardens, Edinburgh.

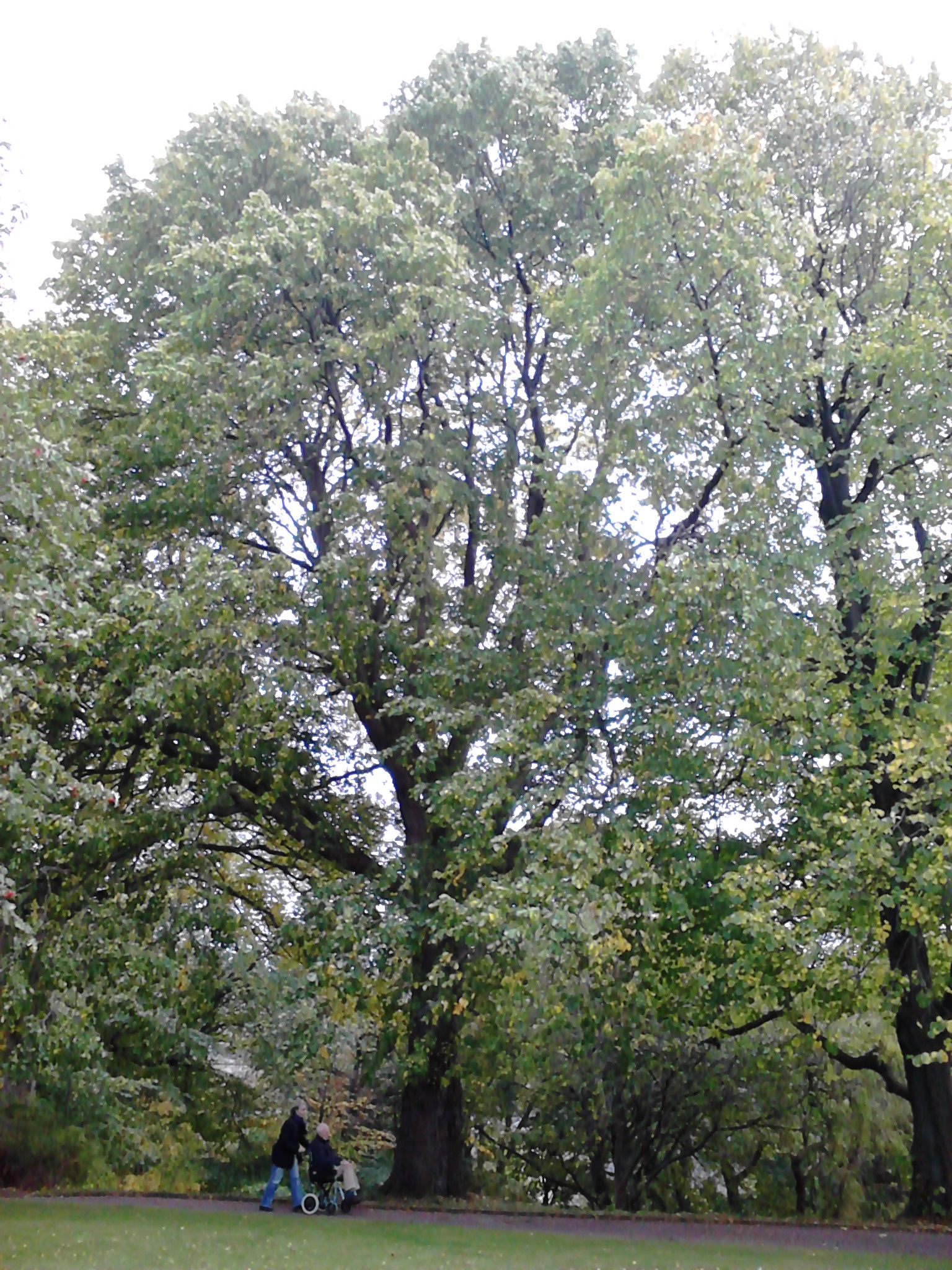
Belgrave Crescent Gardens elm

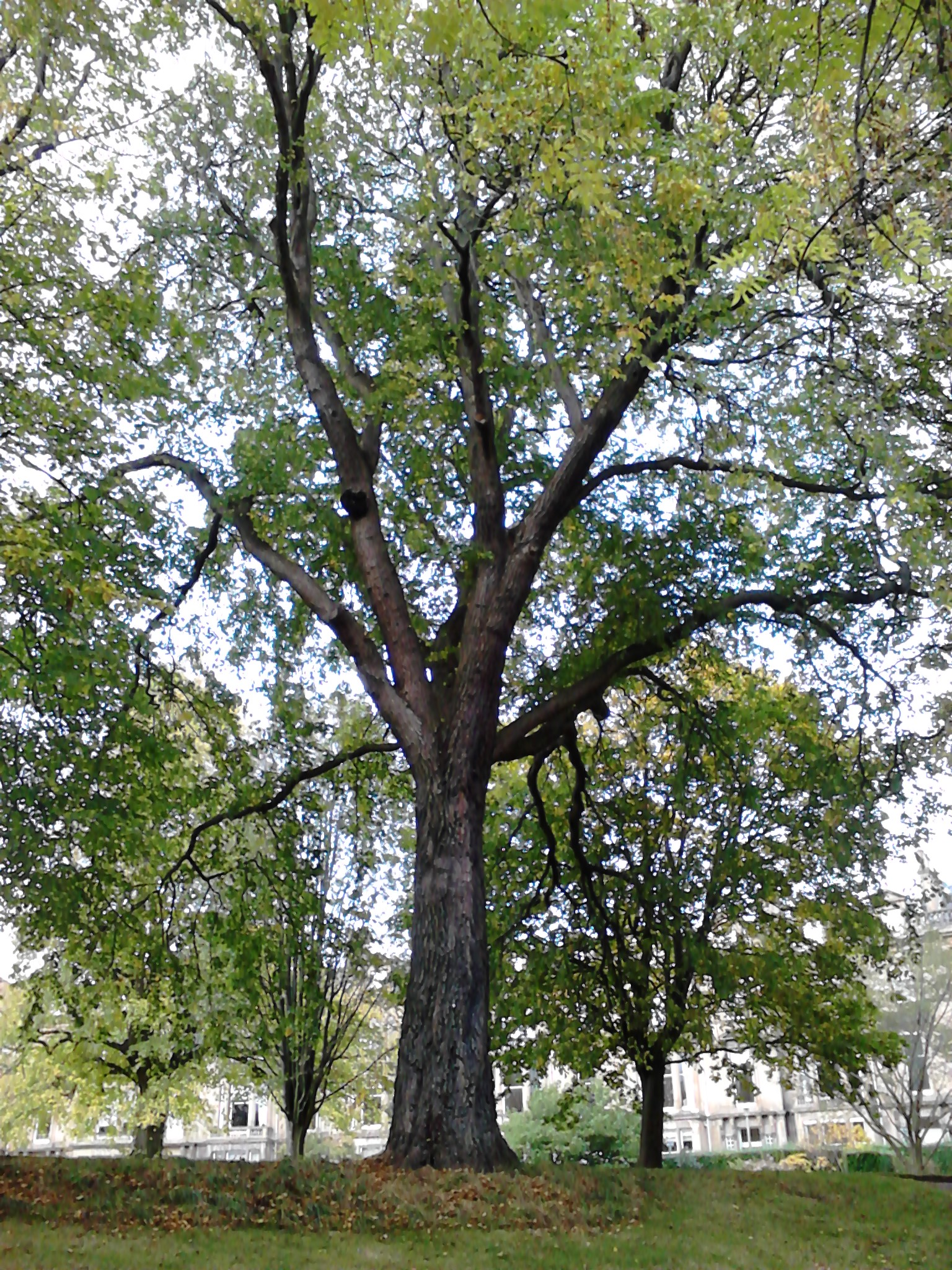
Branching

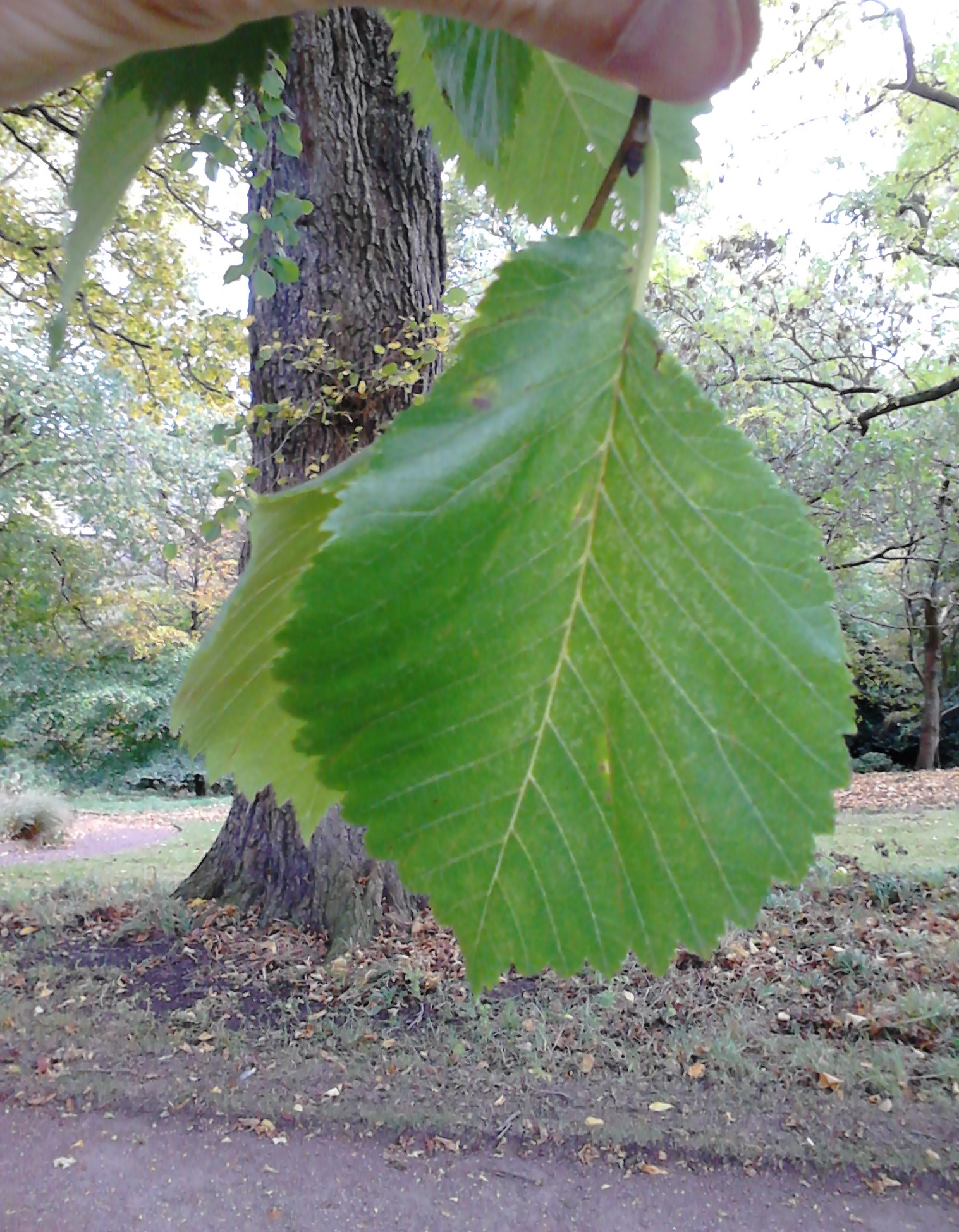
Leaves of same

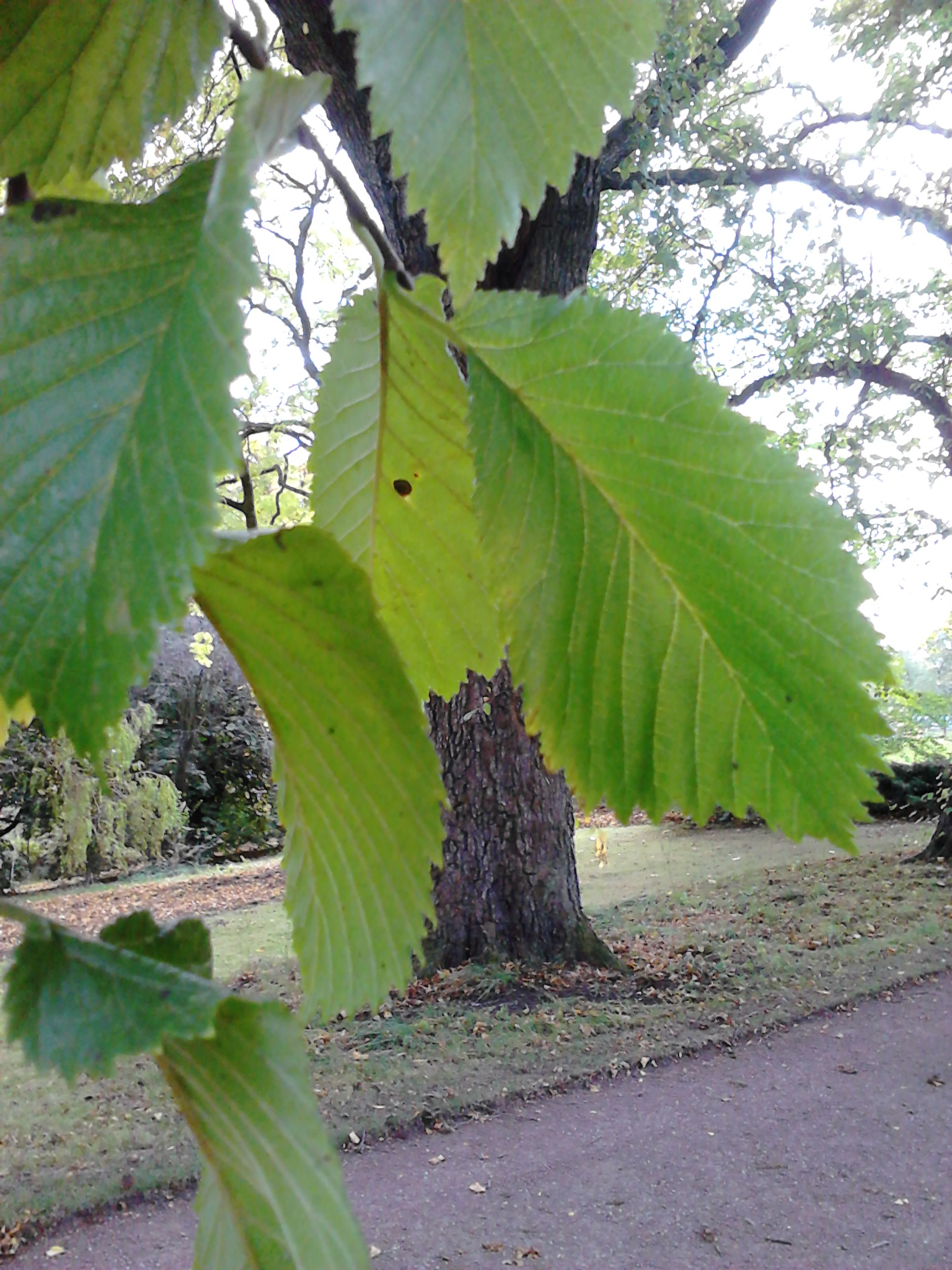

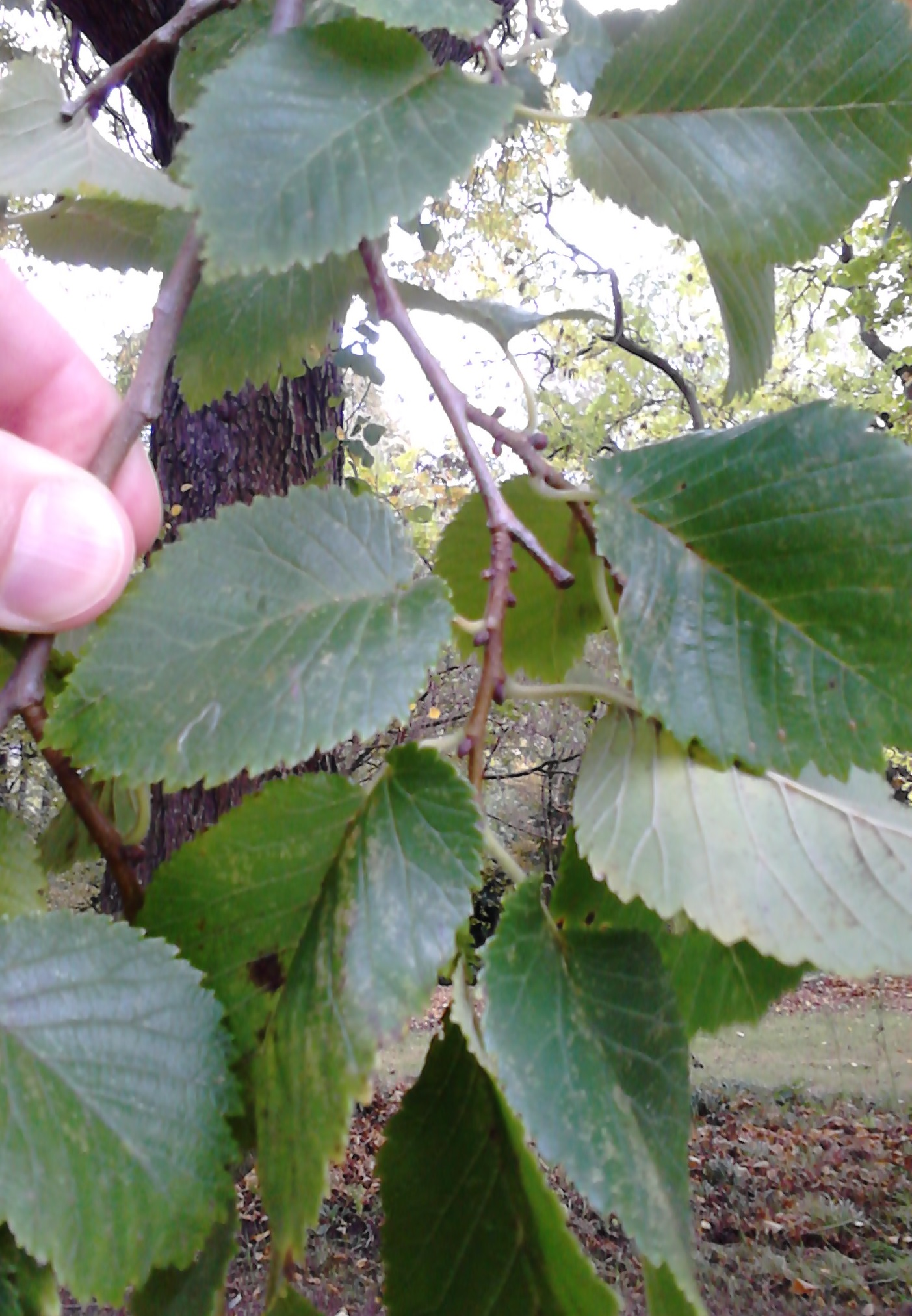
Short-shoot leaves

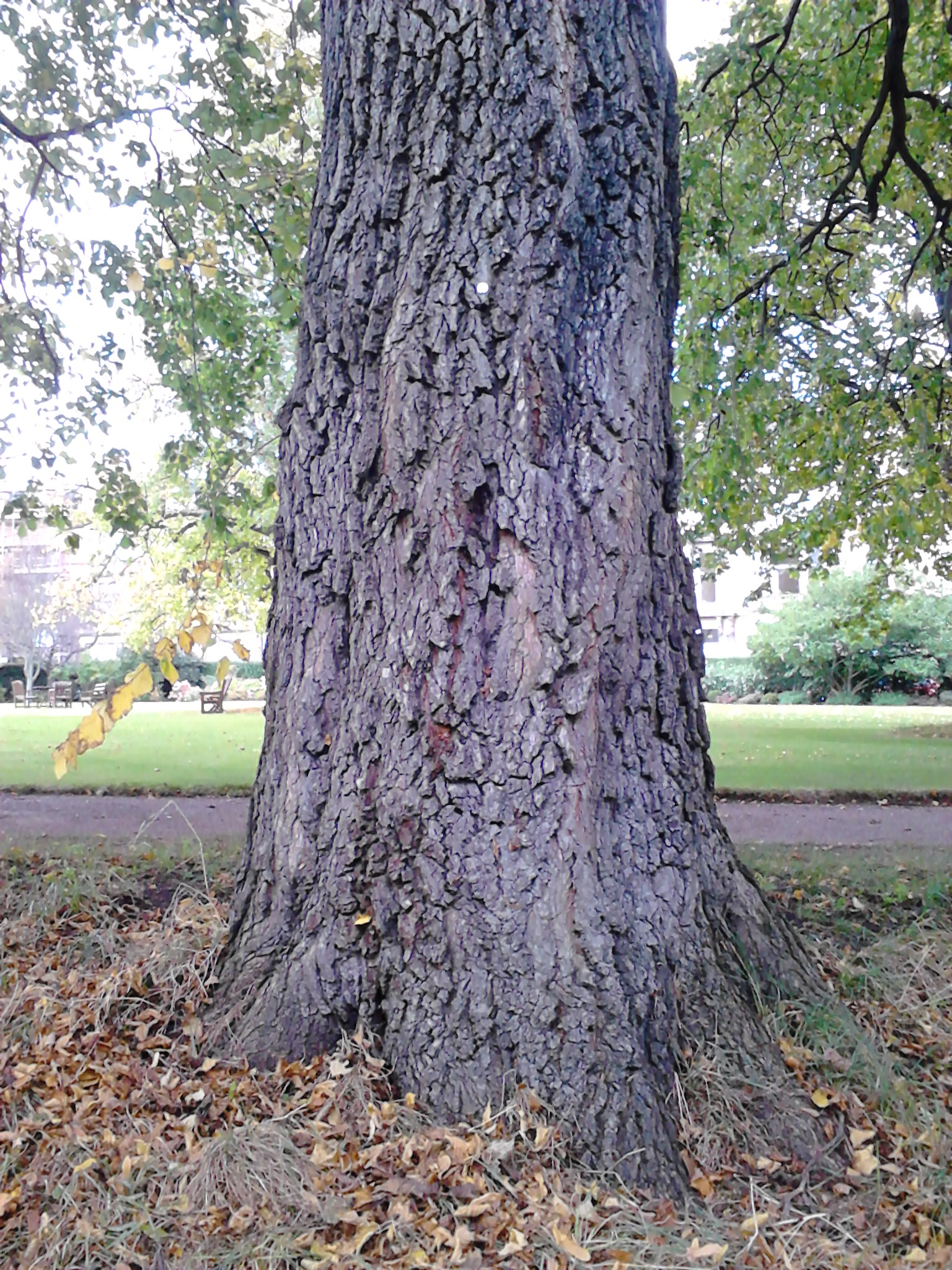
Bole

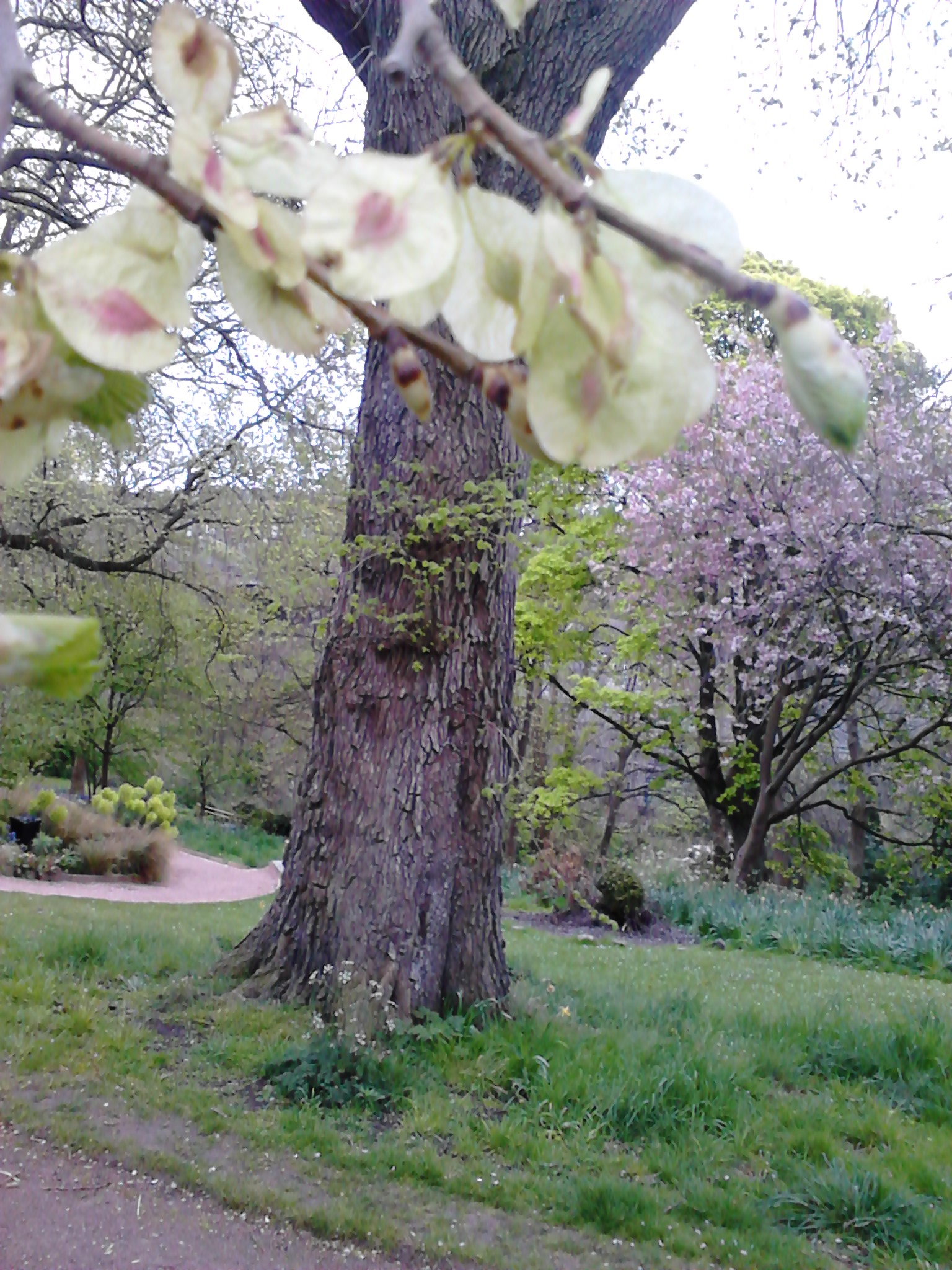
Samarae
