= Ulmus 'Lombartsii' =

Elm cultivar

- Genus: Ulmus
- Cultivar: 'Lombartsii'
- Origin: Netherlands

The elm cultivar Ulmus 'Lombartsii' is considered "possibly Ulmus × hollandica or Ulmus carpinifolia (: minor)" by Green (1964). The tree was raised by Lombarts Nurseries at Zundert, Netherlands, circa 1910.

== Description ==
The tree was first described by Lombarts in the 1921–22 catalogue, p. 25, as U. suberosa pendula Lombartsi: "a graceful tree with pendulous branches covered in corky wings. The wings become less prominent with age". Leaves are small with sharp pointed serratures on the margin, lamina of leaf is unequal at the base and quite long acuminated at the apex. The seed is close to the notch of the samara.

== Pests and diseases ==
Christine Buisman noted in 1933 that 'Lombartsii' appeared to be "less susceptible" than most field elm cultivars to the early strain of Dutch elm disease. The tree is not known to have resistance to the more virulent form.

== Cultivation ==
'Lombartsii', classified as a field elm U. foliacea Gilib., was present in The Hague in the 1930s. With no known resistance to Dutch elm disease, 'Lombartsii' is now very rare in Europe. A suberose field elm that stood at the entrance to Brighton Borough Cemetery, Hartington Road, was listed as such by Brighton and Hove Council in 2022, without provenance information. Though its leaves were close to 'Lombartsii' herbarium specimens, the tree lacked the pendulous habit of 'Lombartsii'. 'Lombartsii' is not known to have been introduced to North America or Australasia.

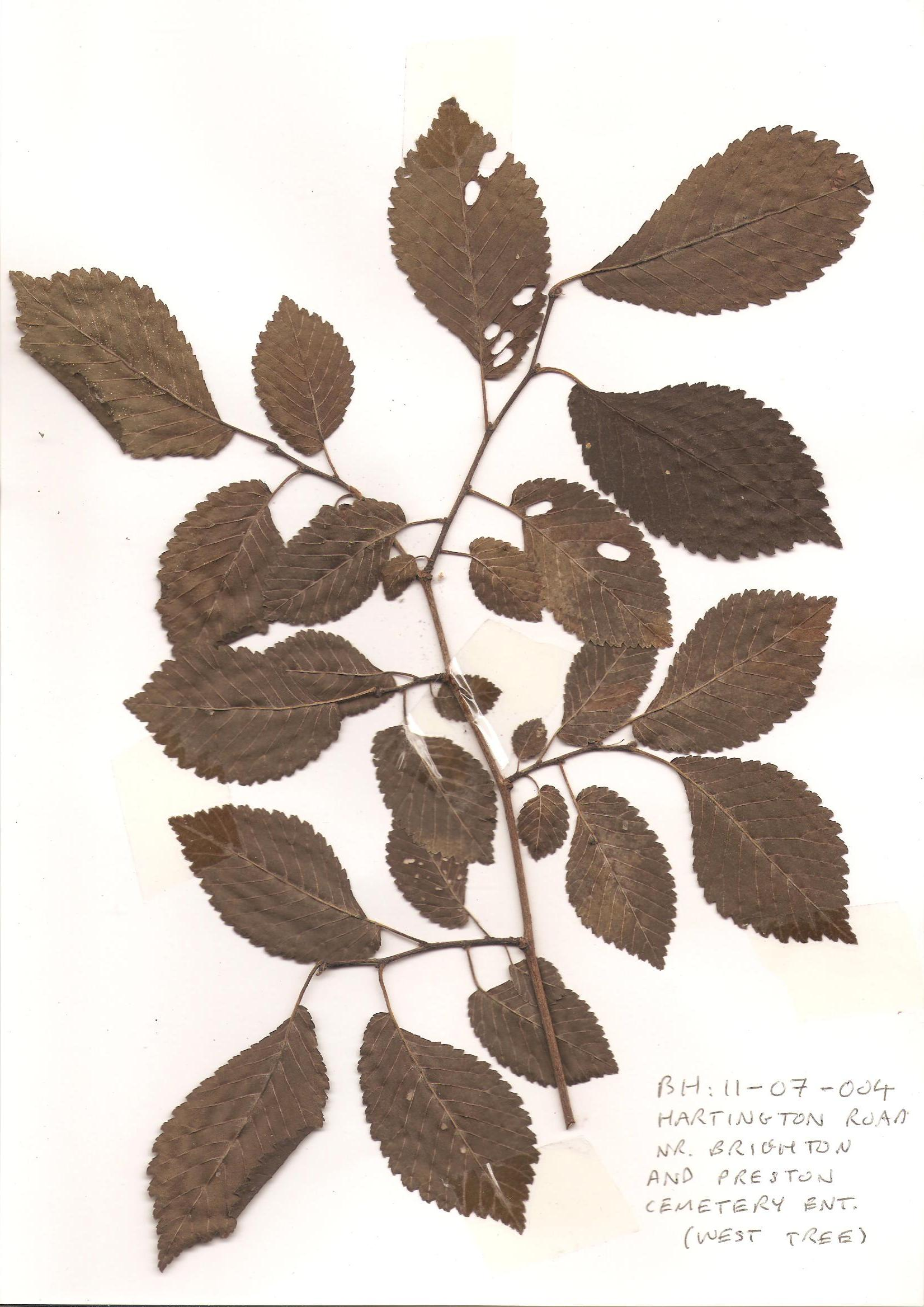
Pressed leaves Brighton Cemetery elm

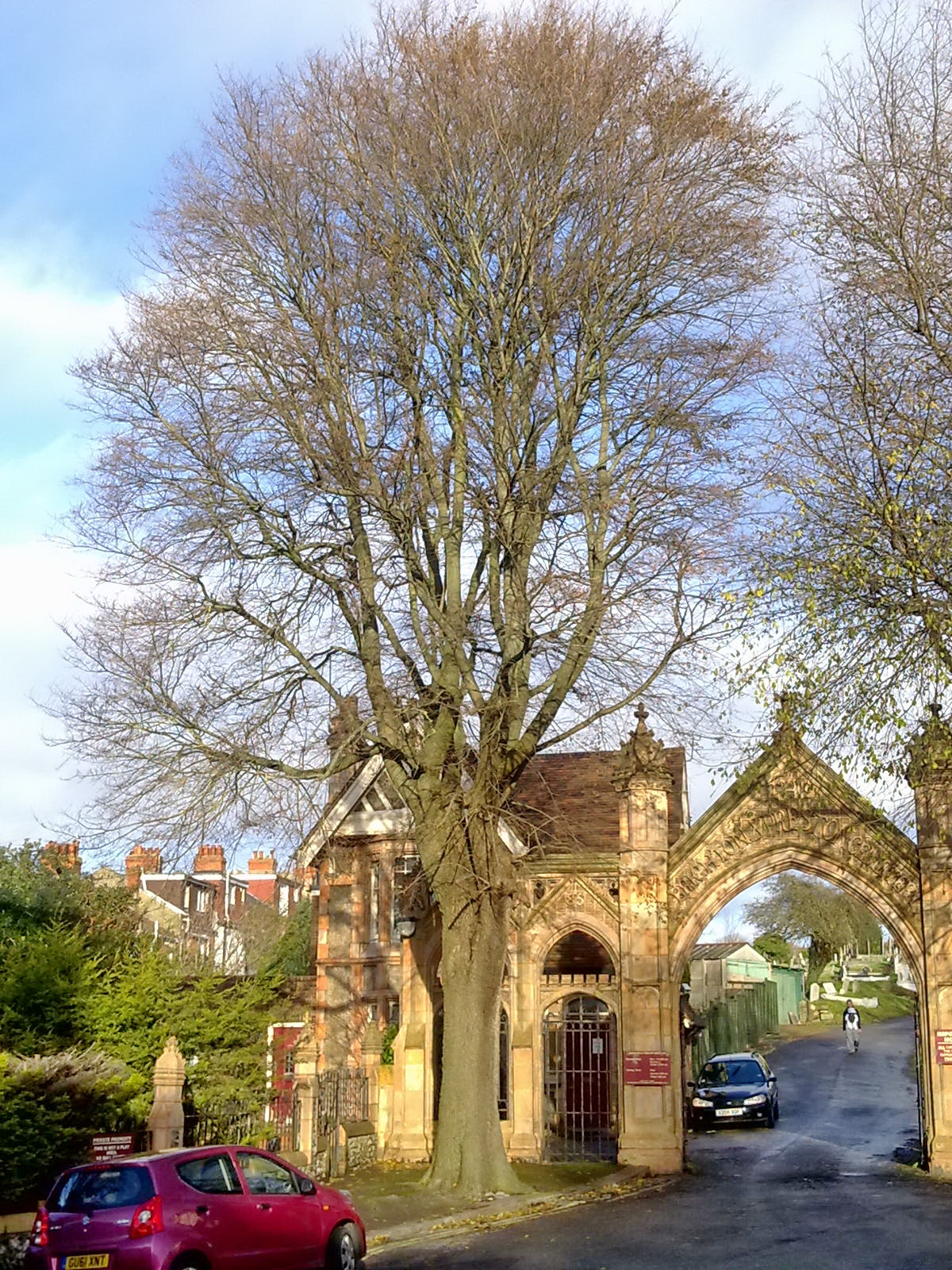
Brighton Cemetery elm, winter

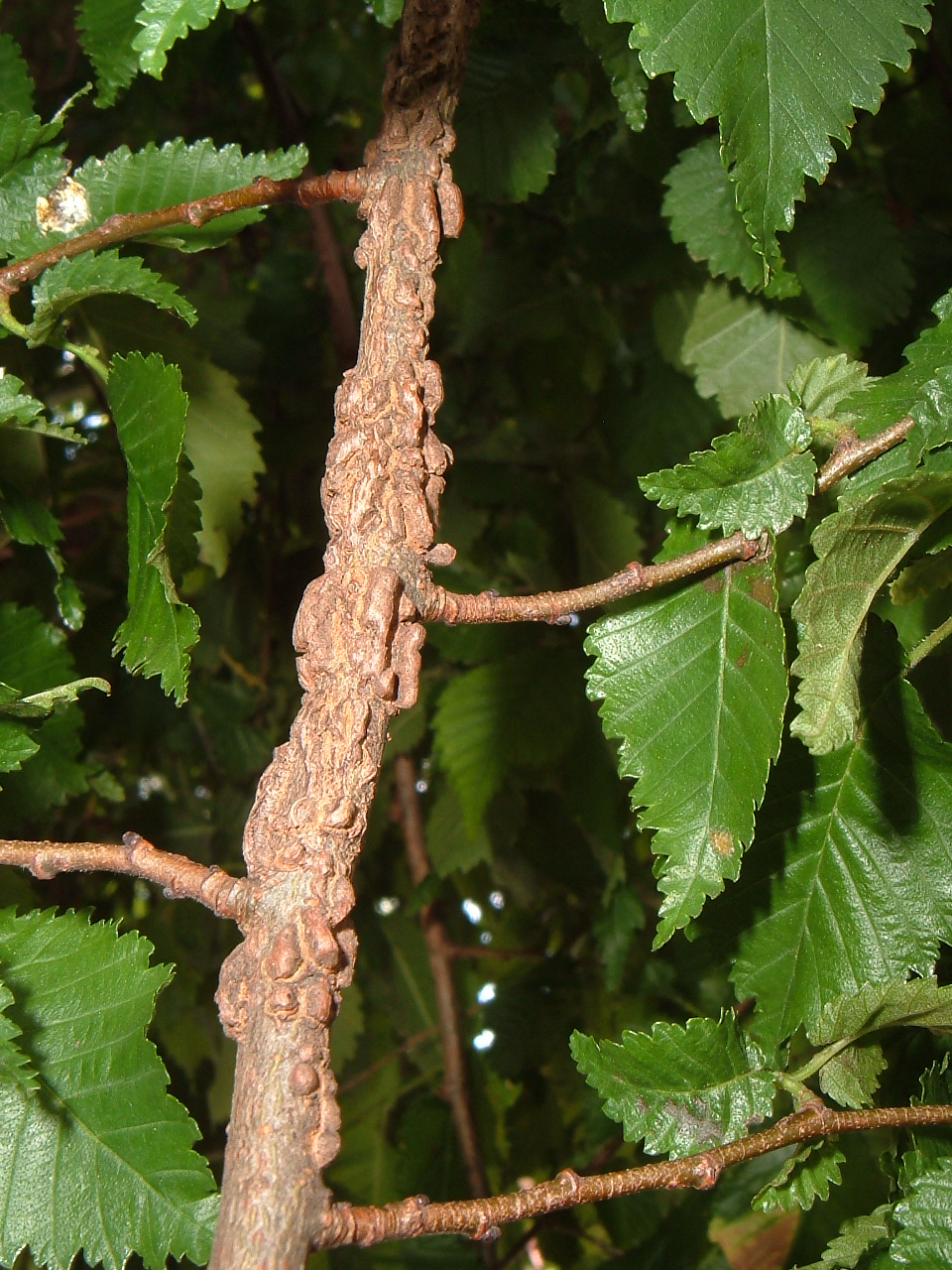
Corky wings of same

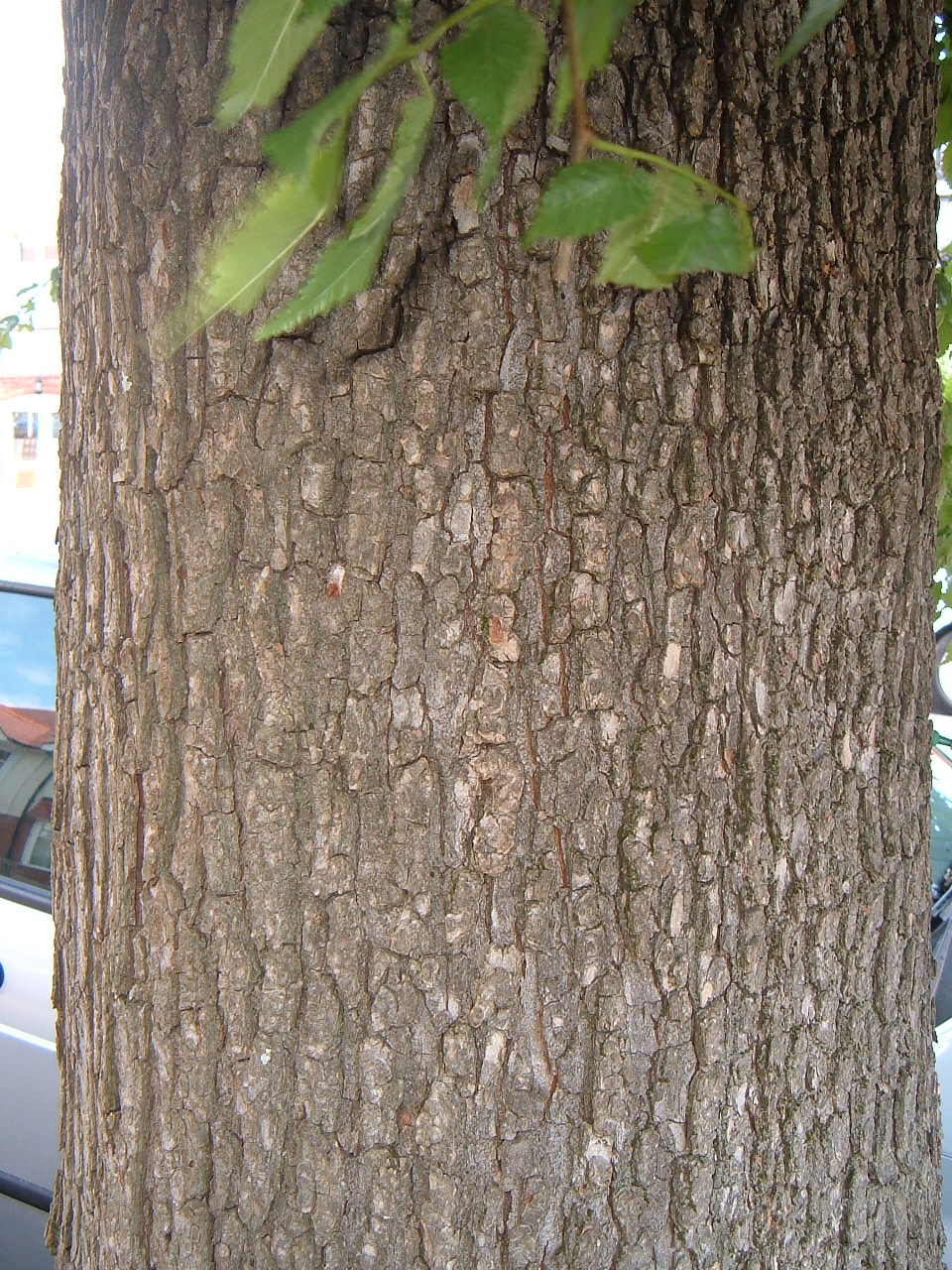
Bark of same

== Accessions ==
Europe

- Grange Farm Arboretum, Lincolnshire, UK. Acc. no. 1133, as U. minor 'Lombartsii.

== Nurseries ==
- Centrum voor Botanische Verrijking vzw, Kampenhout, Belgium, (as Ulmus minor 'Lombartsii').

== Synonymy ==
- Ulmus procera propendens Lombarts: Cat. 1955–56, p. 85.
- Ulmus suberosa pendula Lombartii: Floralia, 41 (39): 615, 1920.
