= Ulmus × hollandica 'Macrophylla Aurea' =

Elm cultivar

- Hybrid parentage: U. glabra × U. minor
- Cultivar: 'Macrophylla Aurea'
- Origin: Europe

The hybrid elm cultivar Ulmus × hollandica 'Macrophylla Aurea' was listed by Bean in Kew Hand-List Trees & Shrubs, ed. 3, 273, 1925 as U . montana var. macrophylla aurea, but without description.

== Description ==
A tree with large, golden leaves.

== Cultivation ==
No specimens are known to survive. An U. Macrophylla aurea appeared in the 1904 catalogue of Kelsey's, New York, where it was described as a vigorous tree with a graceful habit and large, distinctive yellow foliage.

== Synonymy ==
- ?Ulmus americana macrophylla aurea: Späth nursery (Berlin, Germany), catalogue 116, p. 125, 1904–05.
