= Ulmus × hollandica 'Cinerea' =

Elm cultivar

- Hybrid parentage: U. glabra × U. minor
- Cultivar: 'Cinerea'
- Origin: Europe

The hybrid elm cultivar Ulmus × hollandica 'Cinerea' was first listed by George Lindley (father of John Lindley) in 1815, as Ulmus cinerea, the ash-coloured elm, and later by the André Leroy Nurseries, Angers, France, in 1856. It was distributed as Ulmus cinerea by the Baudriller nursery, Angers, and as Ulmus montana cinerea by Louis van Houtte of Ghent. A specimen in cultivation at Kew in 1964 was found to be U. × hollandica, but the tree at Wakehurst Place remains listed as U. glabra 'Cinerea'.

== Description ==
The tree was described as having branches "stunted and tortuous, the upper ascending, the lower more or less pendulous", with "crowded" leaves similar to those of Exeter Elm.

== Pests and diseases ==
The tree is susceptible to Dutch elm disease.

== Cultivation ==
Only one living specimen is known, at Wakehurst Place, England, where it survives by being treated as a hedging plant, too low to attract the attentions of the Scolytus beetles that act as vectors of Dutch elm disease. Introduced to North America, 'Cinerea' was marketed, as Ulmus cinerea, 'Ash-coloured elm', by the Mount Hope Nursery (also known as Ellwanger and Barry) of Rochester, New York from the 1860s. Listed as a wych cultivar, 'Cinerea' was present in The Hague in the 1930s. The tree is not known to have been introduced to Australasia.

== Accessions ==
=== Europe ===
- Royal Botanic Gardens Wakehurst Place, UK. Acc. no. 1973–21051, listed as U. glabra 'Cinerea'.
