= Ulmus 'Marmorata' =

Elm cultivar

- Genus: Ulmus
- Cultivar: 'Marmorata'
- Origin: Germany

The elm cultivar Ulmus 'Marmorata' was identified by Dieck, Zöschen, Germany in Haupt-catalog der Obst- und gehölzbaumschulen des ritterguts Zöschen bei Merseburg 1885 as Ulmus campestris marmorata. Considered "probably U. carpinifolia" (: minor, field elm) by Green.

== Description ==
'Marmorata' was described as "beautifully variegated with white"; the original tree in Destedter Park, Cremlingen, Lower Saxony, was said to have produced massive variegated suckers. A 1901 herbarium specimen from Breslau labelled Ulmus campestris L. f. argenteo-marmoratis shows 'marbled' variegation on 2 to 4 in. Ulmus × hollandica-type leaves.

== Pests and diseases ==
Christine Buisman noted in 1933 that 'Marmorata' appeared to be "less susceptible" than most field elm cultivars to the early strain of Dutch elm disease.

== Cultivation ==
'Marmorata', classified as a field elm U. foliacea Gilib. by Christine Buisman, was present in The Hague in the 1930s. No specimens are known to survive.

== Synonymy ==
- ?Ulmus campestris f. fol. argento-marmoratis: Dippel, Illustriertes Handbuch der Laubholzkunde, 2:25, 1892.
