= Ulmus laevis 'Colorans' =

Elm cultivar

- Species: Ulmus laevis
- Cultivar: 'Colorans'
- Origin: Europe

The European White Elm cultivar Ulmus laevis 'Colorans' was listed as U. effusa (: laevis) var. colorans by Kirchner in Petzold & Kirchner, Arboretum Muscaviense (1864).

Peter Shaw Green (1964) suggested that Herder's U. campestris Linn. rubescens, described in Gartenflora (1871), by its name a wych elm cultivar with "reddening leaves", from Yelagin Island, may have been an earlier listing of a 'Colorans'-type U. laevis under a mistaken species name.

== Description ==
The tree was described by Kirchner as having leaves turning a rich scarlet red in autumn, not golden yellow.

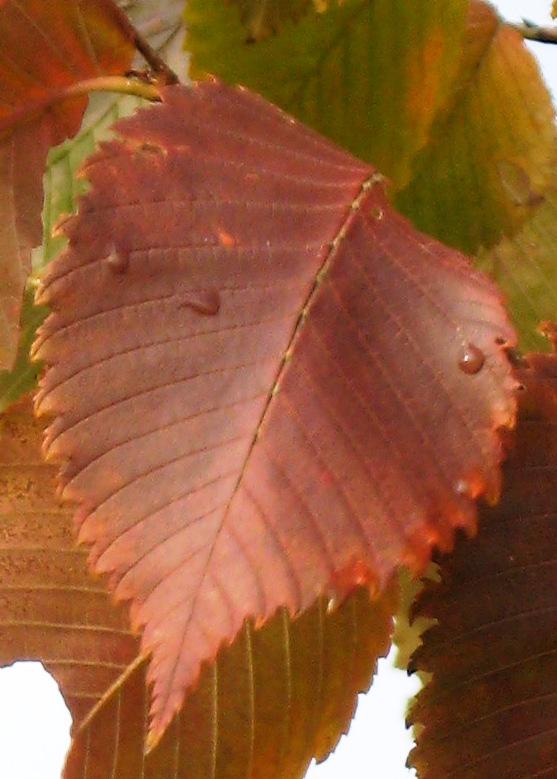
Red autumn leaves, U. laevis

== Cultivation ==
'Colorans' was rare in cultivation. Kirchner planted two specimens in the Arboretum Muscaviense. A tree said to be of this type stood near Hailsham, East Sussex, UK (on the Cuckoo Trail); regrowth from it survives there (2006). The tree is not known to remain in cultivation elsewhere.

== Synonymy ==
- Ulmus effusa var. rubescens: Schwerin, Mitteilungen der Deutschen dendrologischen gesellschaft 20: 423, 1911.
- Ulmus pedunculata (: laevis) var. erubescens: Elwes, in Elwes, H. J. & Henry, A. (1913). The Trees of Great Britain & Ireland. Vol. VII.
- (?) U. campestris Linn. rubescens: Herder Gartenflora 20: 347 1871.
