= Ulmus 'Rubra' =

Elm cultivar

- Genus: Ulmus
- Cultivar: 'Rubra'
- Origin: France

The elm cultivar Ulmus 'Rubra' was reputedly cloned from a tree found by Vilmorin in a wood near Verrières-le-Buisson in the 1830s. It was listed in the 1869 Catalogue of Simon-Louis, Metz, France, as Ulmus campestris rubra, and by Planchon in de Candolle's Prodromus Systematis Naturalis Regni Vegetabilis (1873) as Ulmus libero-rubra: 'Orme à liber rouge' [:elm with red inner bark]. Elwes and Henry (1913) and Bean (1936) listed it as Ulmus montana [:U. glabra Huds.] var. libro-rubro, the former stating that the tree appeared "identical" to Simon-Louis's Ulmus campestris rubra. A specimen in the Zuiderpark, The Hague, was identified in 1940 as a wych elm cultivar, U. glabra Huds. libero rubro. Christine Buisman had listed it in 1932 as U. glabra Huds. librorubra.

Ulmus campestris rubra Hort. was distributed by the Louis van Houtte nursery of Ghent from the late 19th century, and by the Späth nursery of Berlin in the early 20th century. Krüssmann, in Handbuch der Laubgehölze 2: 535, 1962 confirmed it as a cultivar, Ulmus glabra Huds. 'Rubra'.

== Description ==
Henry regarded the tree as a form of wych elm, distinguished solely by the deep red or purplish-red colouring of the inner bark of young branchlets.

== Cultivation ==
No specimens are known to survive. The tree was propagated by grafting. A specimen obtained from van Houtte in 1871 stood in Kew Gardens in the early 20th century, and one obtained from Späth before 1914, and planted in that year, stood in the Ryston Hall arboretum, Norfolk.

== Synonymy ==
- Ulmus libero-rubra: Planchon, in de Candolle Prodr, 17: 160 1873.
- Ulmus libro-rubro: Elwes and Henry (1913), W. J. Bean (1936),
- Ulmus campestris rubra: Simon-Louis (1869)
