= Ulmus pumila 'Aurescens' =

Elm cultivar

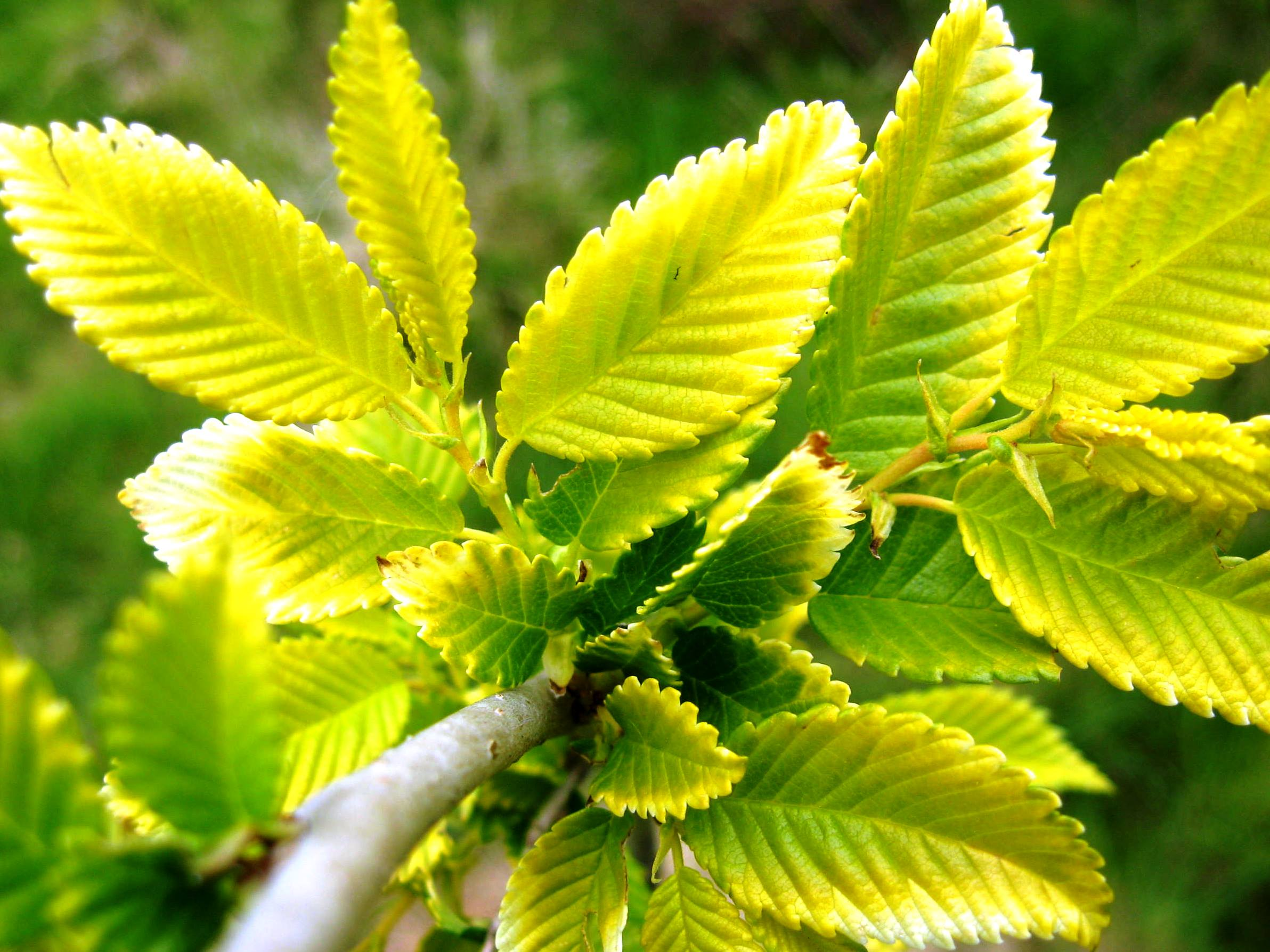
- 'Aurescens' spring foliage
- Species: Ulmus pumila
- Cultivar: 'Aurescens'
- Origin: Germany

The Ulmus pumila cultivar 'Aurescens' was introduced by Georg Dieck at the National Arboretum, Zöschen, Germany, circa 1885. Dieck grew the tree from seed collected in the Ili valley, Turkestan (then a region of Russia, now part of Kazakhstan) by the lawyer and amateur naturalist Vladislav E. Niedzwiecki while in exile there. Dieck originally named the tree U. pinnato-ramosa f. aurescens.

== Description ==
'Aurescens' is distinguished by its golden leaves on emergent shoots in spring; the foliage reverts to dark green by summer.

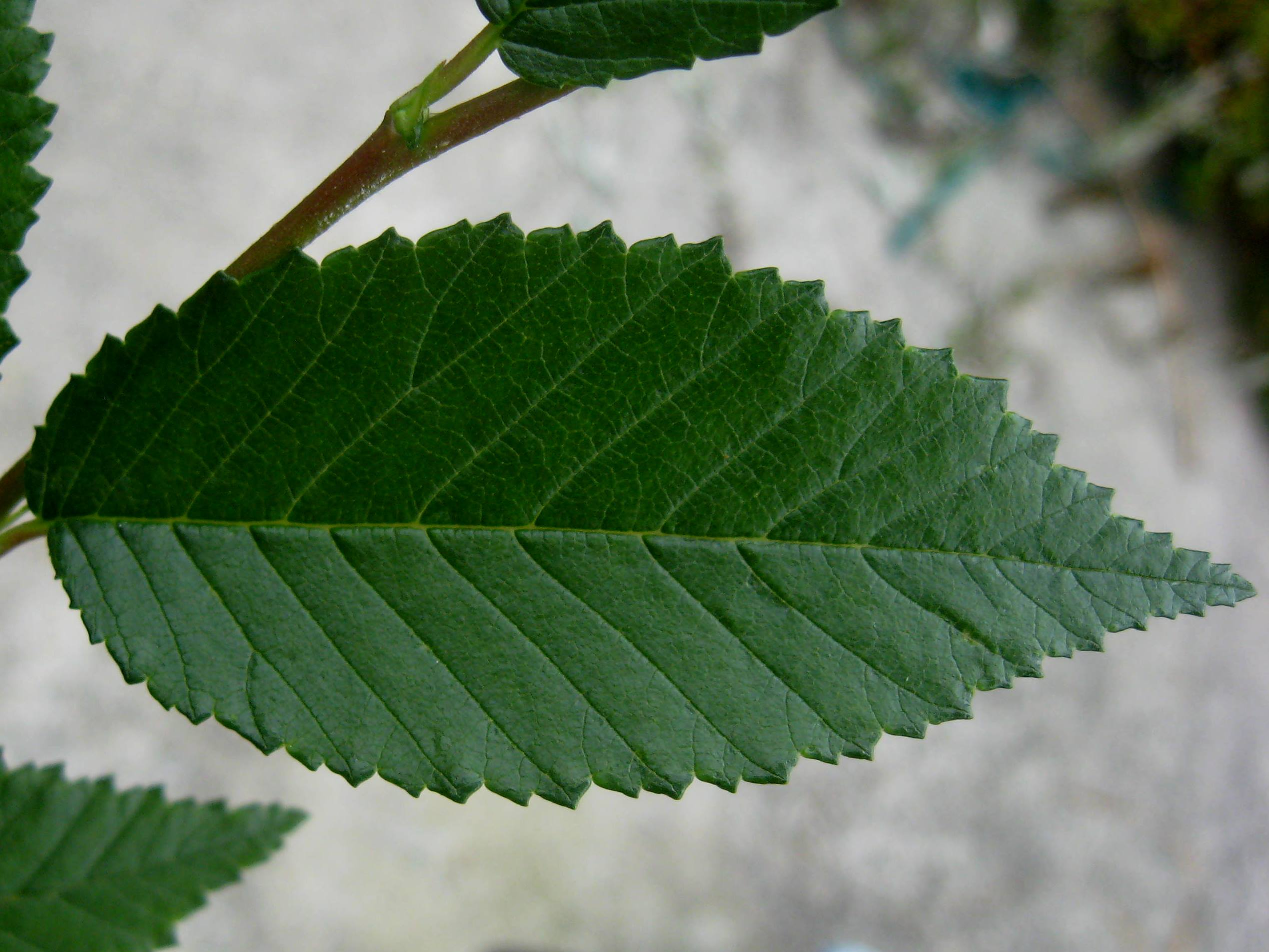
Leaf, in September

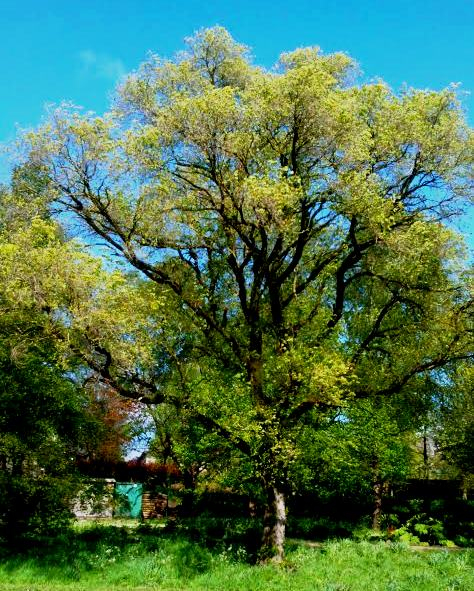
Bute Park tree in spring

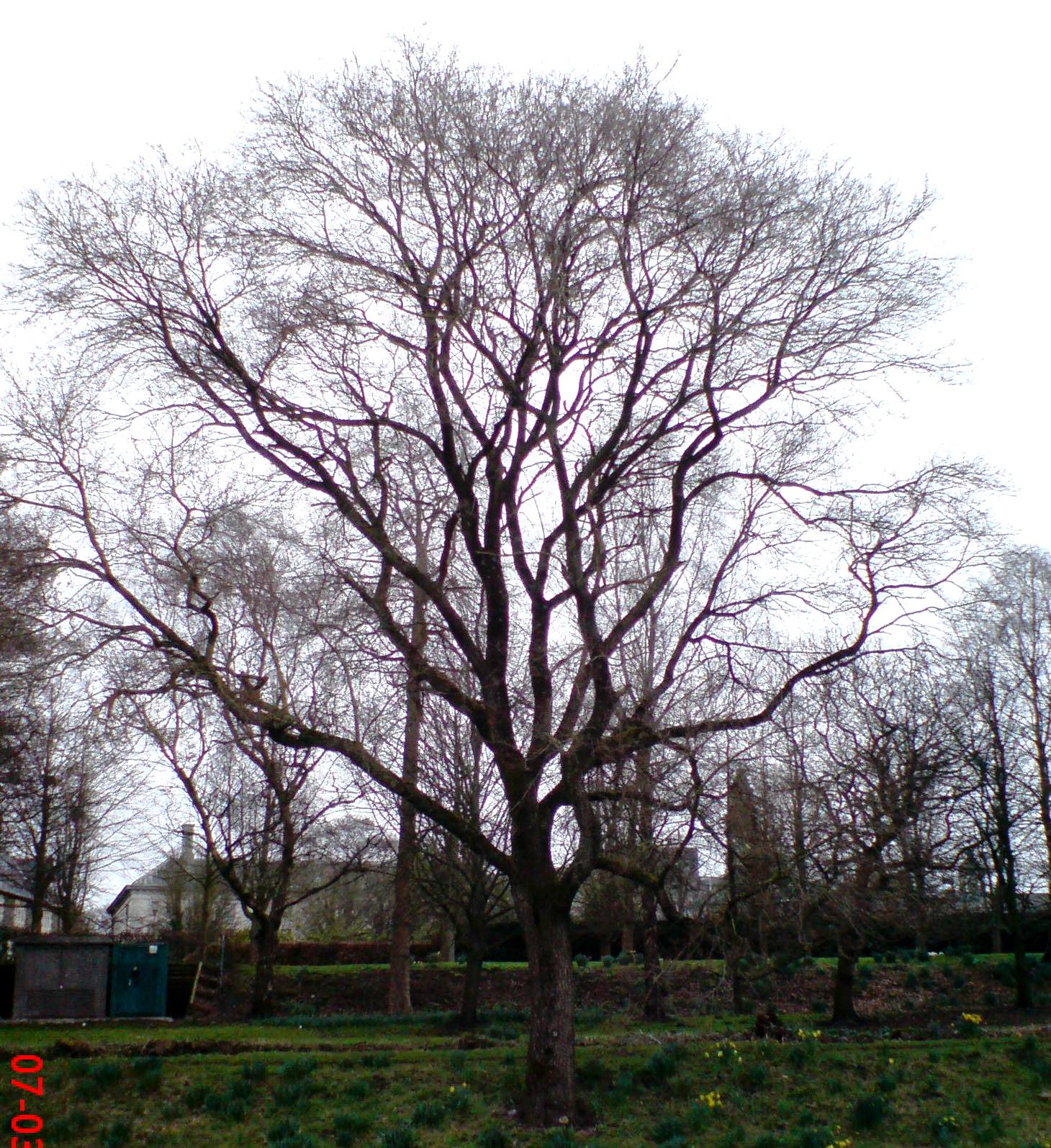
Bute Park tree in winter

== Pests and diseases ==
This cultivar has not been scientifically tested for Dutch elm disease resistance. Two old specimens have survived unscathed by the disease in the UK (see 'Notable trees').

== Cultivation ==
The tree is rare in Europe and unknown in North America and Australasia. In trials in England, it quickly perished where grown on winter-waterlogged ground.

== Notable trees ==
Two mature specimens are known in the UK: one at Bute Park Arboretum, Cardiff, planted c. 1980, height 15 m × 65 cm d.b.h. in 2004; another grows in a private garden at Seaford, East Sussex, recorded in 1995.

== Accessions ==
Europe

- Bute Park Arboretum, Cardiff, UK. One tree, tag number 1907, planted c. 1980, no other accession details available.
- Grange Farm Arboretum, Sutton St James, Spalding, Lincolnshire, UK. As U. pumila var. arborea 'Aurescens'. Acc. no. 1092.
- Stanmer Park Arboretum, Brighton. Brighton & Hove Council list, 2025. No accession details.
- Wijdemeren City Council elm collection, Netherlands. 5 planted in Overmeerseweg, Nederhorst den Berg, 2015.

== Nurseries ==
=== Europe ===
- Noordplant , Glimmen, Netherlands.
