= Ulmus americana 'Fiorei' =

Elm cultivar

- Species: Ulmus americana
- Cultivar: 'Fiorei'
- Origin: Charles Fiore Nurseries, Prairie View, Illinois, US

The American elm cultivar Ulmus americana 'Fiorei' was raised by the Charles Fiore Nurseries, Prairie View, Illinois, before 1949, and first listed as 'Fiorii', Fiore Elm, without description. It is no longer listed by the company.

== Description ==
The tree has a narrow form with dense, heavy foliage and a smooth bark.

== Pests and diseases ==
No specific information available, but the species as a whole is highly susceptible to Dutch elm disease and elm yellows; it is also moderately preferred for feeding and reproduction by the adult elm leaf beetle Xanthogaleruca luteola, and highly preferred for feeding by the Japanese beetle Popillia japonica in the United States. U. americana is also the most susceptible of all the elms to verticillium wilt.

== Cultivation ==
Only one tree is known to survive in North America (see Accessions); the tree is not known to have been introduced to Europe or Australasia.

== Synonymy ==
- Ulmus americana 'Fastigiata': Charles Fiore Nurseries, Prairie View, Illinois, Wholesale Cat. p. 33, 1959-60. (Latin epithet considered illegitimate as proposed after 1 January 1959).

== Accessions ==
=== North America ===
- Arnold Arboretum, US. Acc. no. 1238-61.
