= Ulmus minor 'Glandulosa' =

Elm cultivar

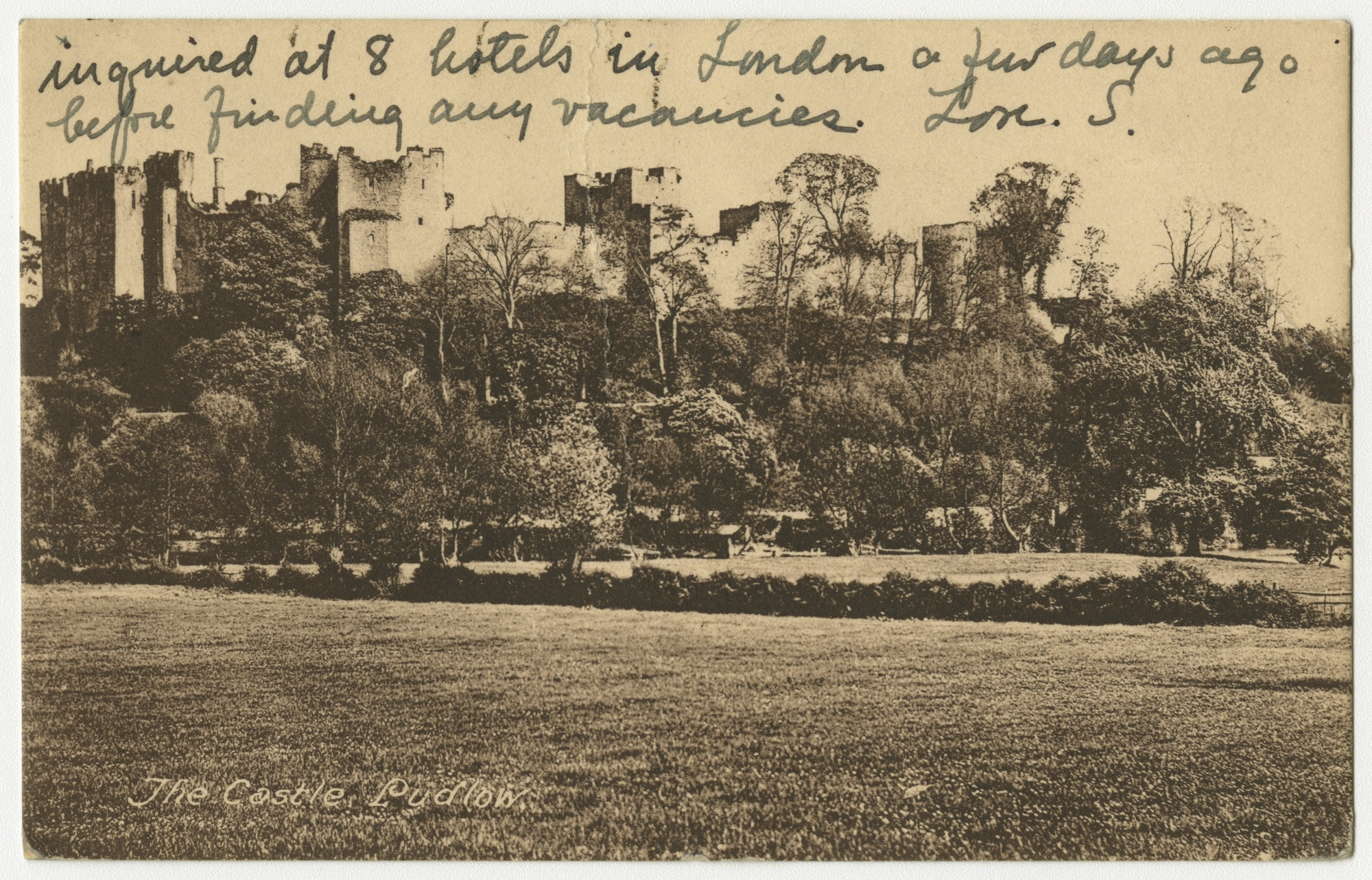
- 'Glandulosa', the tall trees on the west terraces, upper and lower, of Ludlow Castle (c.1900)
- Species: Ulmus minor
- Cultivar: 'Glandulosa'
- Origin: England

The Field Elm cultivar Ulmus minor 'Glandulosa' was described as Ulmus glabra [:smooth-leaved] Mill. var. glandulosa by Lindley in A Synopsis of British Flora, arranged according to the Natural Order (1829), from trees near Ludlow, Shropshire. Melville identified a specimen in Ludlow in 1939, calling it in a 1946 paper "a good form of U. carpinifolia" [:U. minor ], describing it more fully and renaming it U. carpinifolia Gled. var. glandulosa (Lindl.). Regarding it as out of its natural range and deliberately planted, he referred to it as The Ludlow Elm, the "type tree" of a "variety" of Field Elm. Herbarium specimens of 'Glandulosa' are held in both the Lindley Herbarium in Cambridge and the Borrer Herbarium at Kew.

Ley (1910) noted that other forms of field elm exhibit "the same glandular development, but without the same [leaf-]shape". He considered that "These must probably be placed under var. glandulosa".

== Description ==
Lindley reported the leaves "very glandular beneath". Melville (1946) included an illustration of a natural-size short shoot, with leaves on average 7 × 3 cm, with a slender base to the long side and a long petiole to 12 mm, and gave the following description: "Distal and subdistal leaves of the short shoots narrowly obovate, acute, with greatest breadth about 45% of the lamina length in the distal and 50% in the subdistal leaves; basal half of margin of long side, arched or nearly straight, making a sharp rectangular turn at the base 2–4 mm from the petiole". Ley (1910) added that the leaves are "scabrous and epilose above, pilose beneath".

== Pests and diseases ==
Though susceptible to Dutch Elm Disease, field elms produce suckers and usually survive in this form in their area of origin.

== Cultivation ==
Lindley noted that the tree was cultivated near Ludlow, where Ley in 1910 found "large trees on the terraces, upper and lower, of Ludlow Castle, to the west side", and where Melville found an old pollarded specimen in 1939, below the castle ramparts and 100 yards from the bridge. In a Kew Herbarium specimen Melville included a postcard on which he indicated the tree. No old trees survive at Ludlow, but there are (2019) a number of monopolar Ulmus minor root suckers at 10 m in height, notably devoid of samarae in April, with numerous smaller suckers about them. Ley also verified specimens of var. glandulosa near Lutterworth, Leicestershire.

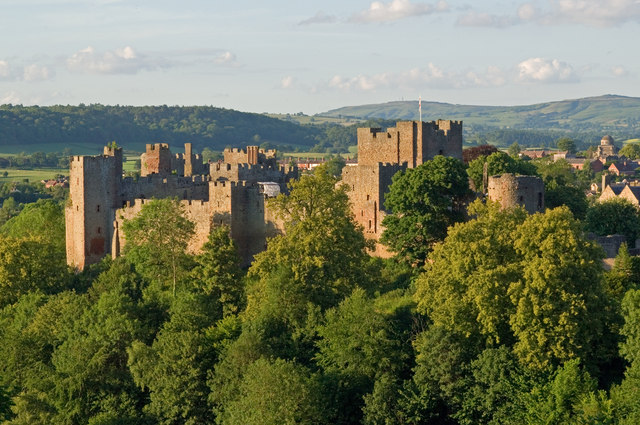
The western terraces of Ludlow Castle, where Ley found large specimens of var. glandulosa in 1910

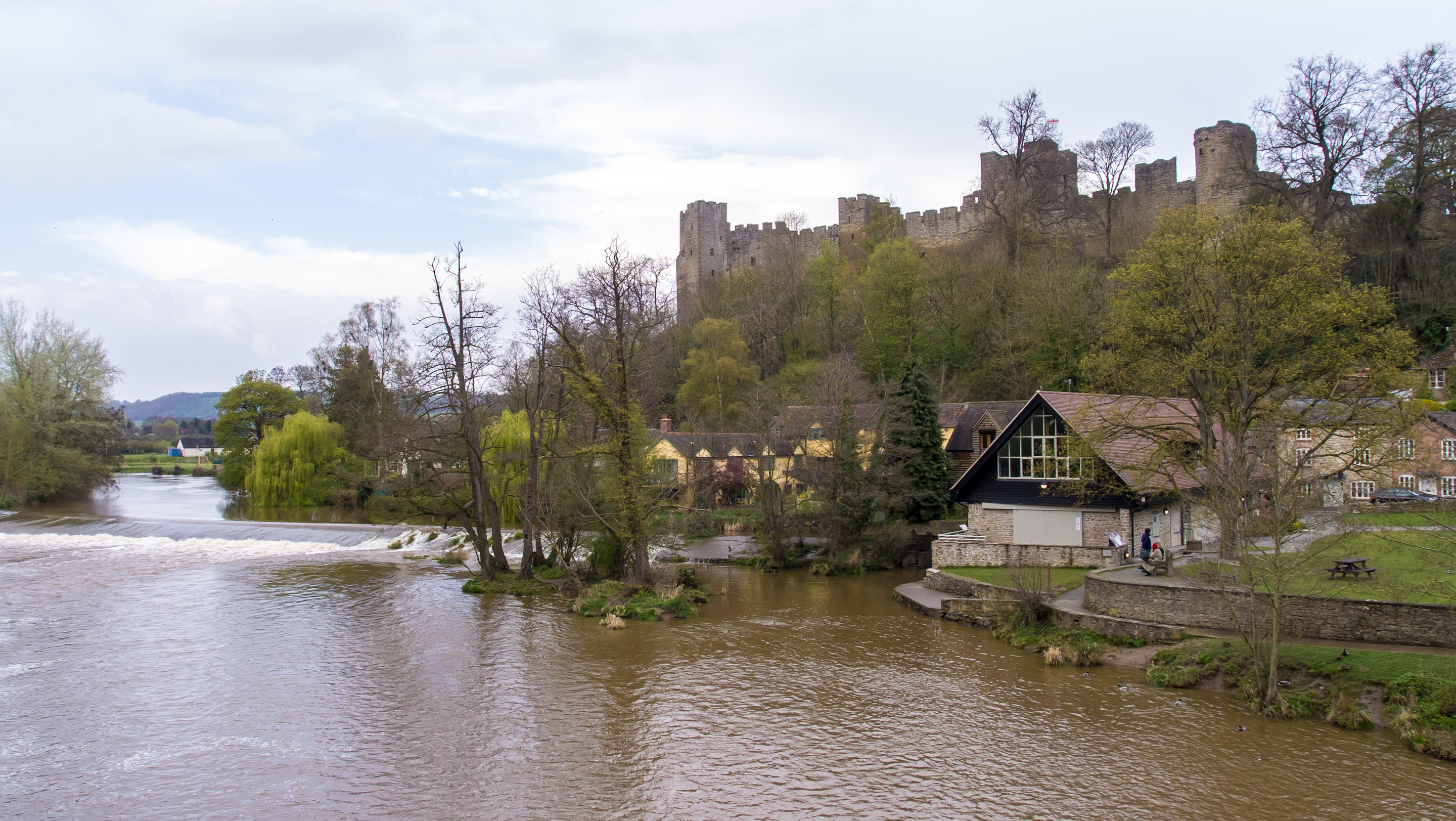
Same
