= Ulmus pumila 'Green King' =

Elm cultivar

- Species: Ulmus pumila
- Cultivar: 'Green King'
- Origin: US

Ulmus pumila 'Green King' is a Siberian elm cultivar. It was once believed to have been derived from a crossing of the Siberian Elm Ulmus pumila with the American Red Elm Ulmus rubra. However, it is now apparent the tree originated as a sport of U. pumila in 1939 at the Neosho Nurseries, Neosho, Missouri.

== Description ==
The tree typically forms a wide base and conical crown, not dissimilar to the European Hornbeam Carpinus betulus 'Fastigiata' (known as 'Pyramidalis').

== Pests and diseases ==
See under Ulmus pumila.

== Cultivation ==
Green King's rate of growth is claimed to be from 2.5 m (8') to 3.4 m (11') per annum, and it offers significant resistance to wind and drought. The tree featured in the elm trials conducted by Northern Arizona University at Holbrook, where it was noted that "the hybrid (sic) had not been widely tested for resistance to DED (Dutch elm disease)". Its performance in the Arizona trials seems to have been insufficiently good or bad to warrant any further comment. Although the tree remains commercially available in the United States, it is no longer widely planted, having been eclipsed by later developments such as 'Homestead' and disease-resistant cultivars of the American elm U. americana. Moreover, its planting, as a clone of the Siberian Elm, is prohibited in Nevada and Oregon. The tree is not known to have been introduced to Europe or Australasia.

== Synonymy ==
- Ulmus 'Broadleaf Hybrid': Kammerer, E. L. in Bull. Pop. Inf. Morton Arb. 36 (5): 25, 1961.
- Ulmus 'Field's New Hybrid Elm': Henry Field Seed & Nursery Co., Shenandoah, Iowa, (who renamed the tree 'Green King' c. 1960).
- Ulmus 'Green King': Morton Arboretum Catalogue, 2006.
- Ulmus 'Neosho'

== Accessions ==
=== North America ===
- Morton Arboretum, US. Acc. no. 78–69, (listed simply as Ulmus 'Green King').

=== Europe ===
- Grange Farm Arboretum, Lincolnshire, UK. Acc. no. 1263, (listed simply as Ulmus 'Green King').

== Nurseries ==
=== North America ===
- Stark Bros Nurseries & Orchards Co., Louisiana, Missouri, US.
