= Ulmus minor 'Viminalis Incisa' =

Elm cultivar

- Species: Ulmus minor
- Cultivar: 'Incisa'

The Field Elm cultivar Ulmus minor 'Viminalis Incisa' was listed and described by John Frederick Wood, F.H.S., in The Midland Florist and Suburban Horticulturist (1851), along with what he called U. Viminalis and U. Viminalis Variegata, as U. Viminalis Incisa, the Cut-leaved Twiggy-branched elm. An Ulmus campestris var. nuda subvar. incisa Hort.Vilv. was described by Wesmael in 1863, and considered by Green (1964) to be possibly one of Melville's U. × viminalis.

== Description ==
Wood (1851) described 'Viminalis Incisa' as less compact in habit than U. Viminalis and U. Viminalis Variegata, but nevertheless erect, with slender rod-like branches and more serrated foliage. Wesmael's 'Incisa' (1863) had leaves irregularly sinuate-incised, with long pointed teeth.

== Pests and diseases ==
Trees of the U. minor 'Viminalis' group are very susceptible to Dutch elm disease.

== Cultivation ==
No specimens so labelled are known to survive.
