= Ulmus minor 'Viminalis Marginata' =

Elm cultivar

- Species: Ulmus minor
- Cultivar: 'Marginata'
- Origin: Europe

The Field Elm cultivar Ulmus minor 'Viminalis Marginata', a variegated form of Ulmus minor 'Viminalis', was first listed as Ulmus campestris var. viminalis marginata Hort. by Kirchner in 1864. Both Van Houtte and Späth marketed an U. campestris viminalis marginata in the late 19th century.

Nursery, arboretum, and herbarium specimens, however, confirm that 'Viminalis Marginata' was the name sometimes given to the more generally variegated 'Viminalis' cultivar 'Pulverulenta'.

== Description ==
'Viminalis Marginata' is distinguished by its leaves which have mottled grey and white margins. This description appears to indicate a different clone from 'Pulverulenta'.

== Pests and diseases ==
The 'Viminalis' cultivars are very susceptible to Dutch elm disease.

== Cultivation ==
'Viminalis Marginata' appeared in various late 19th- and early 20th-century European nursery lists and collections. The tree was distributed in Victoria, Australia, from the 1880s. A specimen stands in Adelaide Botanic Garden, Australia (see 'Accessions').

Herbarium specimens show that three trees supplied by the Späth nursery of Berlin to the Royal Botanic Garden Edinburgh in 1902 as U. campestris viminalis marginata were the clone now called 'Pulverulenta' or 'Variegata' (see under 'Pulverulenta'). The Ulmus campestris viminalis marginata supplied by Späth and planted in 1897 at the Dominion Arboretum, Ottawa, Canada, and a tree from Späth planted under that name in 1913 in the Ryston Hall arboretum, Norfolk, UK, in the early 20th century, may therefore also have been 'Pulverulenta' or 'Variegata'.

== Notable trees ==
The variegated 'Viminalis' in Batsford Arboretum, Moreton-in-Marsh, the only known old specimen of a variegated 'Viminalis' surviving in the UK, is listed by the arboretum as 'Viminalis Marginata', but its mottled variegation recalls the Latin name of the cultivar 'Viminalis Pulverulenta' rather than the description (above) of 'Viminalis Marginata'.

== Synonymy ==
- Ulmus campestris punctata Hort.
- Ulmus campestris var. viminalis marginata Hort.: Kirchner, in Petzold & Kirchner Arboretum Muscaviense 556, 1864.
- Ulmus campestris viminalis superba Hort..
- Ulmus scabra viminalis fol. variegatis.
- Ulmus suberosa elegantissima Hort..
- Ulmus viminalis argentea: Hillier, (Winchester, England), Catalogue 2P, p. 100, 1938.
- Ulmus viminalis var. argentea: Bean, Kew Hand-List Trees & Shrubs, ed. 3 275, 1925.
- Ulmus viminalis marginata: Krussmann, Handbuch der Laubgehölze 2: 539, 1962.

== Accessions ==
=== Australasia ===
- Adelaide Botanic Garden, Australia

== Nurseries ==
=== Europe ===
- Larch Cottage Nurseries, Melkinthorpe, Penrith, Cumbria, UK (labelled 'Viminalis Marginata' but resembling 'Viminalis Pulverulenta')
