= Ulmus minor 'Viminalis Gracilis' =

Elm cultivar

- Species: Ulmus minor
- Cultivar: 'Gracilis'

The Field Elm cultivar Ulmus minor 'Viminalis Gracilis' [:'slender'] is a form of U. minor 'Viminalis'. Cultivars listed as Ulmus gracilis Hort. by Kirchner (1864), and as U. scabra viminalis gracilis Hort. by Dieck (1885), were considered by Green to be forms of Melville's U. × viminalis. A 1929 herbarium specimen held at the Hortus Botanicus Leiden is labelled U. campestris var. viminalis f. gracilis, implying a cultivar that differed from the 'type' tree.

== Description ==
The epithet 'gracilis' usually refers to the slender habit of a cultivar. Dippel (1892), who treated the 'Viminalis' group as a form of U. montana (sometimes used for hybrids in his day), described viminalis f. gracilis as a small to medium-sized tree, with even finer, more hanging branches than type-'Viminalis', and smaller, narrower, almost slit-edged leaves. The Leiden herbarium specimen shows a leaf with narrow, almost hair-like, scarcely double teeth. Alfred Rehder wrote (1919), "The form named 'gracilis' has been distinguished from 'Viminalis' by the more deeply incised usually obovate leaves, but the two forms of leaves pass gradually into each other and may be found even on the same plant."

== Pests and diseases ==
Trees of the U. minor 'Viminalis' group are very susceptible to Dutch elm disease.

== Cultivation ==
No specimens are known to survive.
