= Ulmus minor 'Viminalis Pendula' =

Elm cultivar

- Species: Ulmus minor
- Cultivar: 'Pendula'

The field elm cultivar Ulmus minor 'Viminalis Pendula', a weeping form of U. minor 'Viminalis', was first listed c.1890 as Ulmus antarctica pendula Hort., and briefly described, by the Späth nursery of Berlin, which distributed it from the late 19th century. On the continent it was also known as U. campestris antarctica pendula. Maxwell T. Masters in the Journal of the Royal Horticultural Society (1891) listed it as U. viminalis pendula.

== Description ==
'Pendula' was said to be a dainty form of Ulmus antarctica [: 'Viminalis'] with hanging branches.

== Pests and diseases ==
Trees of the U. minor 'Viminalis' group are very susceptible to Dutch elm disease.

== Cultivation ==
No specimens are known to survive. One tree supplied by the Späth nursery of Berlin was planted in 1896 at the Dominion Arboretum, Ottawa, Canada, as U. campestris antarctica pendula. Three specimens were supplied by Späth to the Royal Botanic Garden Edinburgh in 1902 as U. antarctica pendula, and may survive in Edinburgh as it was the practice of the Garden to distribute trees about the city (viz. the Wentworth Elm). A specimen of U. antarctica pendula, planted in 1914, stood in the Ryston Hall arboretum, Norfolk, in the early 20th century.

== Synonymy ==
- U. campestris antarctica pendula Hort.
- U. antarctica pendula Hort.
