= Ulmus minor 'Viminalis' =

Elm cultivar

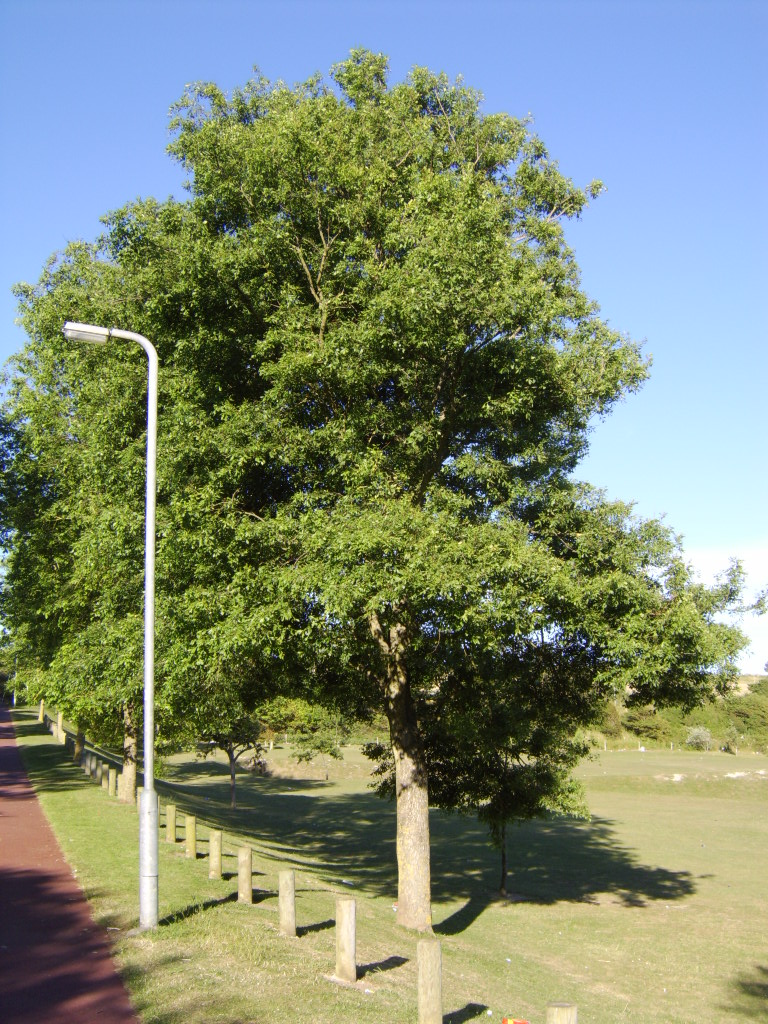
- 'Viminalis', The Vale, Rottingdean, Brighton
- Species: Ulmus minor
- Cultivar: 'Viminalis'
- Origin: England

The field elm cultivar Ulmus minor 'Viminalis' (:'willow-like'), occasionally referred to as the twiggy field elm, was raised by Masters in 1817, and listed in 1831 as U. campestris viminalis, without description. Loudon added a general description in 1838, and the Cambridge University Herbarium acquired a leaf specimen of the tree in 1866. Moss, writing in 1912, said that the Ulmus campestris viminalis from Cambridge University Herbarium was the only elm he thought agreed with the original Plot's elm (not U. minor 'Plotii') as illustrated in Dr. Plot's Natural History of Oxfordshire (1677) from specimens growing in an avenue and coppice at Hanwell near Banbury. The illustration, by Michael Burghers, is the earliest known botanical drawing of elm-leaves in England. Elwes and Henry (1913) also considered Loudon's Ulmus campestris viminalis to be Dr Plot's and Michael Burghers' Hanwell elm. Its 19th-century name, U. campestris var. viminalis, led the cultivar to be classified for a time as a variety of English Elm. On the Continent, 'Viminalis' was listed as Ulmus antarctica Hort., the 'zierliche Ulme' [:'dainty elm'] of Kirchner's Arboretum Muscaviense (1864).

Melville considered 'Viminalis' one form, the 'type' cultivar, of the natural, variable hybrid, U. minor × U. minor 'Plotii', which occurs in England where the two trees overlap, and which he called, believing U. plotii Druce a species, U. × viminalis. He questioned, however, Henry's claim that 'Viminalis' was Dr Plot's elm. Writing in 1940 and referring to a pencil rubbing in Herb. Druce, vol. 113 of the Sloane Collection, he wrote "I can see no reason to doubt that this is Plot's plant," but "it is [not] U. × viminalis Lodd". Boom (1959) and Bean (1988) listed 'Viminalis' as a cultivar and the 'type' clone of Melville's U. × viminalis.

== Description ==
Wood (1851) described 'Viminalis' as "a neat-growing compact tree, with small foliage", Henry (1913) as a "tree with ascending branches, pendulous branchlets, and sparse foliage", and Bean (1981) as a "narrow-headed, rather slender tree". 'Viminalis' is slow-growing; it can ultimately reach 20 m in height. Leaves vary from obovate-elliptic to narrowly elliptic; they are deeply serrated, < 5.0 cm long, tapering to a nearly symmetrical base and long-acuminate at the tip, with prominent white axil tufts on the undersides. In his description of Ulmus antarctica Hort. (1864), Kirchner added that the leaves are more or less downward-curving, with longish petioles, and that the leaf-margins have numerous deep, double, hook-shaped teeth, "so that the leaves appear almost slit".

Loudon's sketch (below) suggests that a narrow leaf was fairly uniform on his tree. The Cambridge University Herbarium specimen of Loudon's Ulmus campestris viminalis shows leaves resembling both Henry's 'Viminalis' drawing and Schneider's 'Antarctica' drawing, confirming the synonymy. 'Viminalis' has been likened to Zelkova × verschaffeltii. Bean wrote in 1936, "I have never seen it bearing fruit, although it flowers." The old specimen in Lydiard Street, Ballarat, Victoria, however (see 'Notable trees'), produces abundant fruit, the seed being close to the marginal notch in somewhat broad samarae.

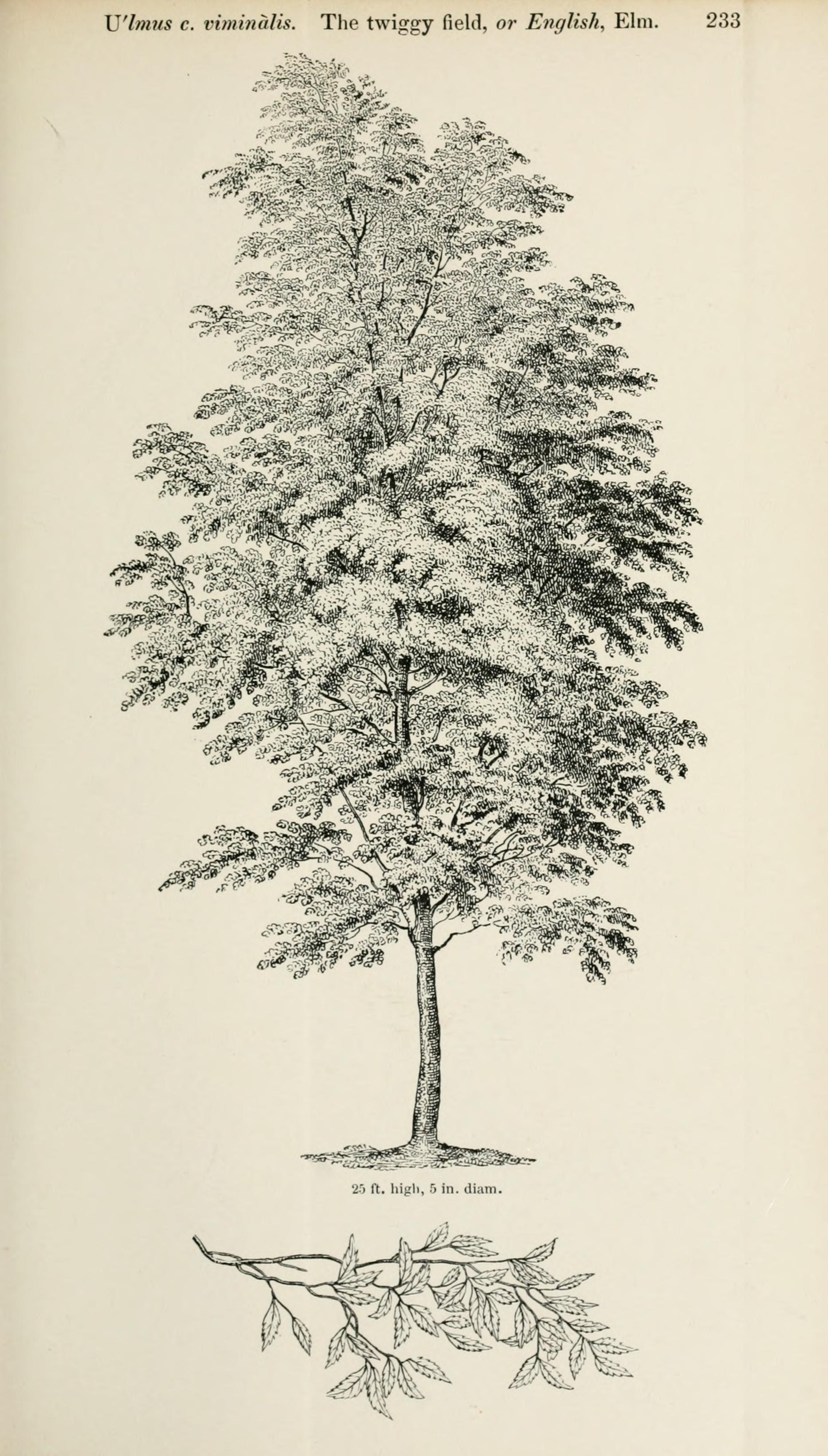
Loudon's Ulmus campestris viminalis, with leaf sketch

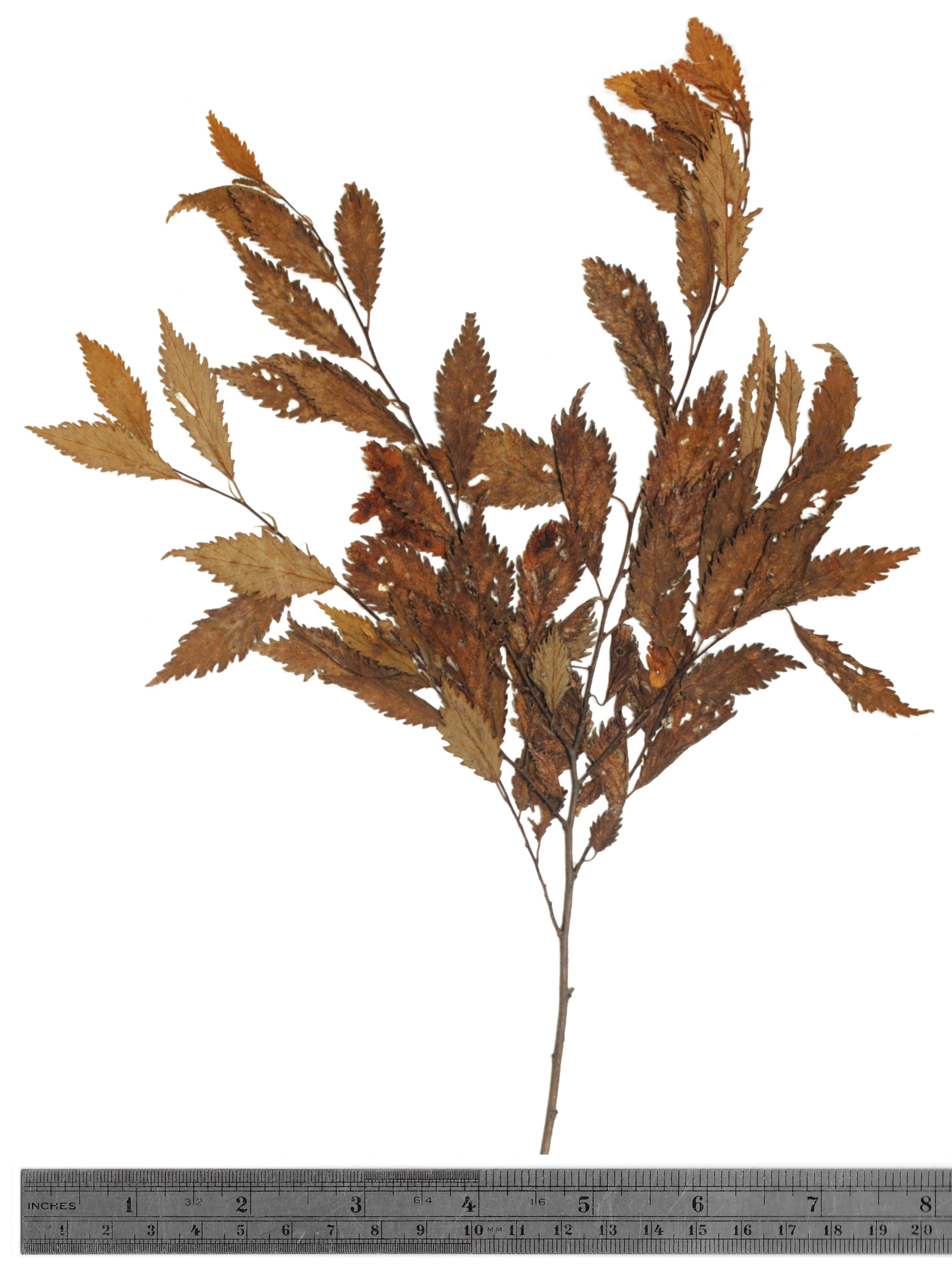
U. campestris viminalis leaves, Cambridge University Herbarium, labelled 'Herb. J. Lindley, Ph.D., Purchased in 1866'

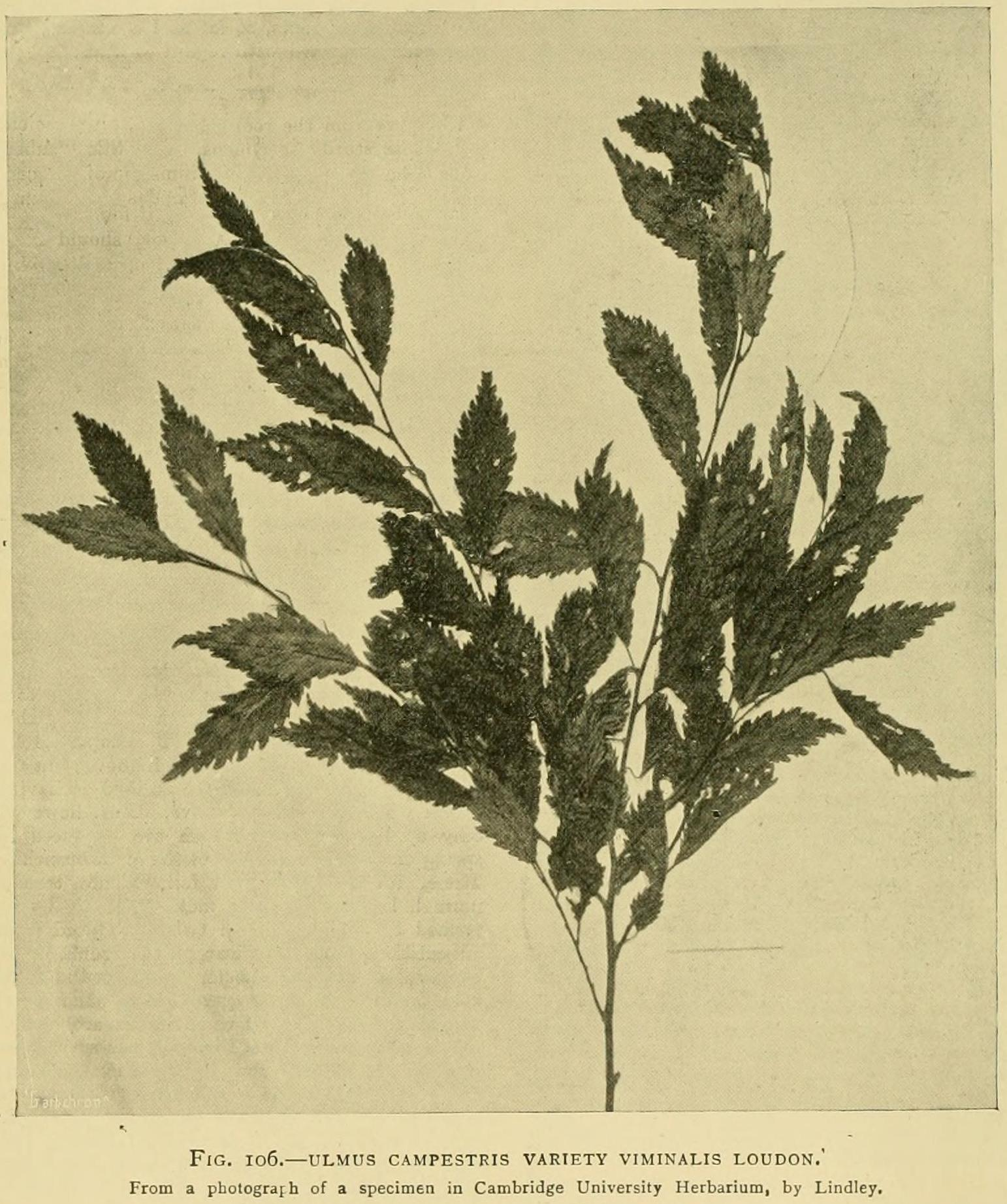
1912 Gardeners' Chronicle illustration of the same, identifying specimen as Loudon's 'Viminalis'

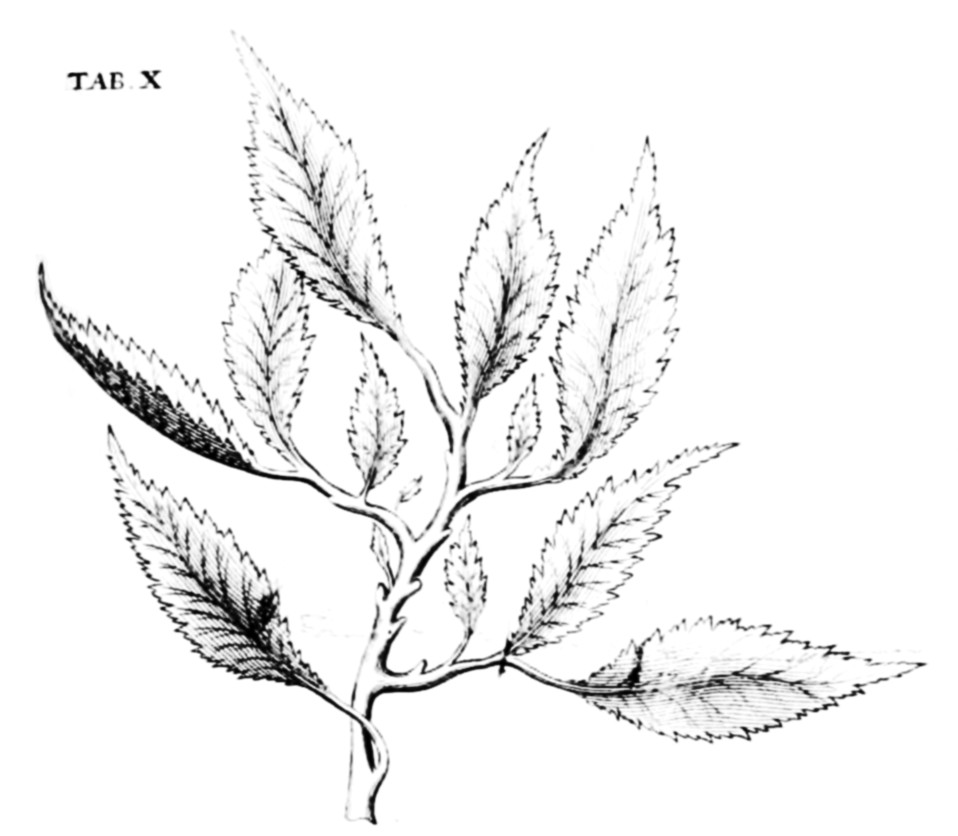
Michael Burghers' drawing of Dr Plot's Hanwell elm, for comparison (1677).

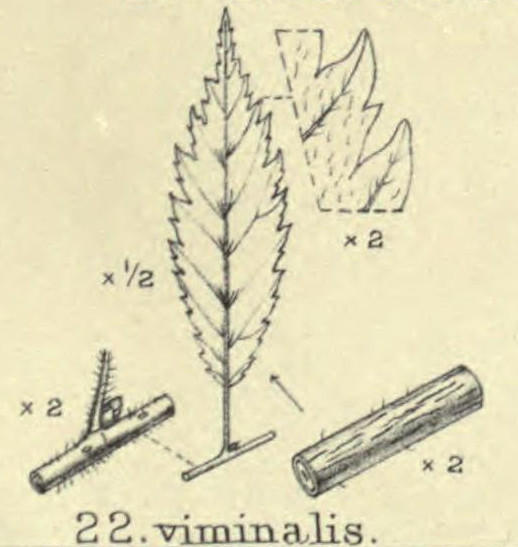
Leaf-drawing of Elwes & Henry's 'type' tree (1913)

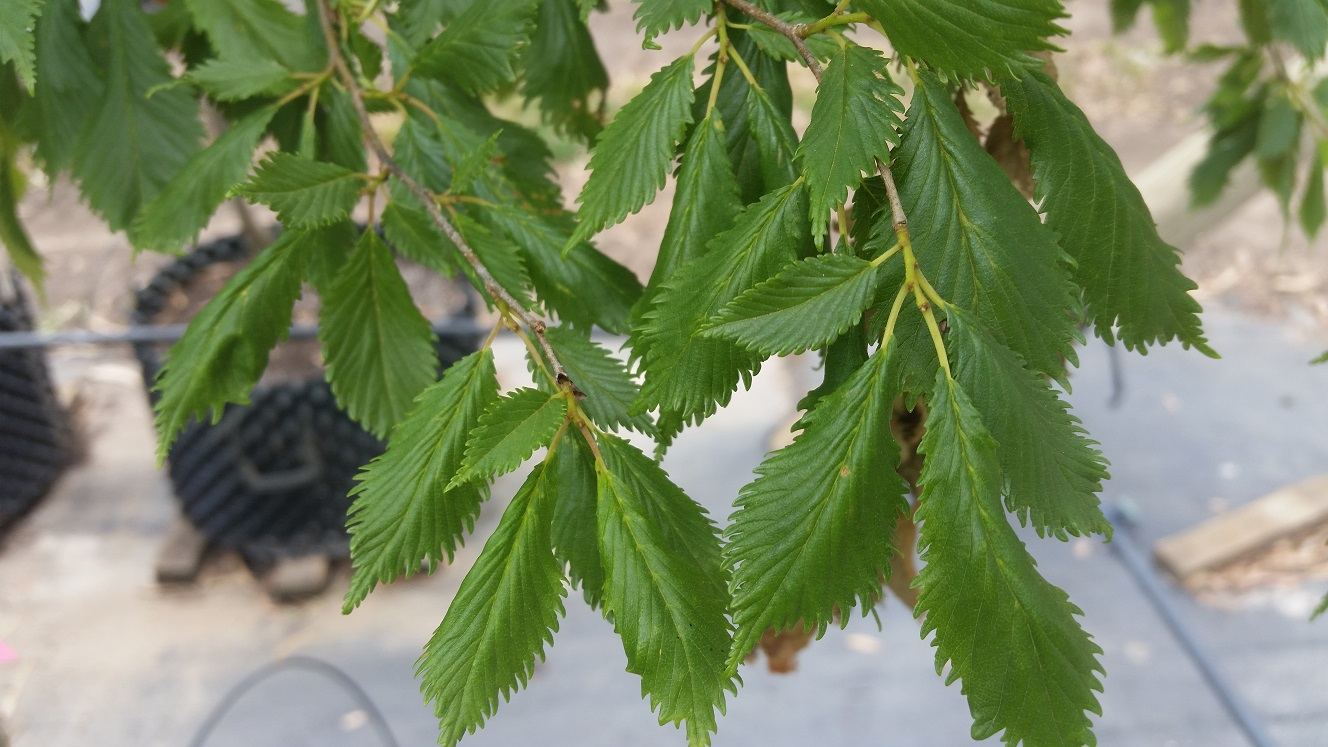
Foliage of 'Viminalis' saplings cloned from the tree in Lydiard St, Ballarat, Victoria

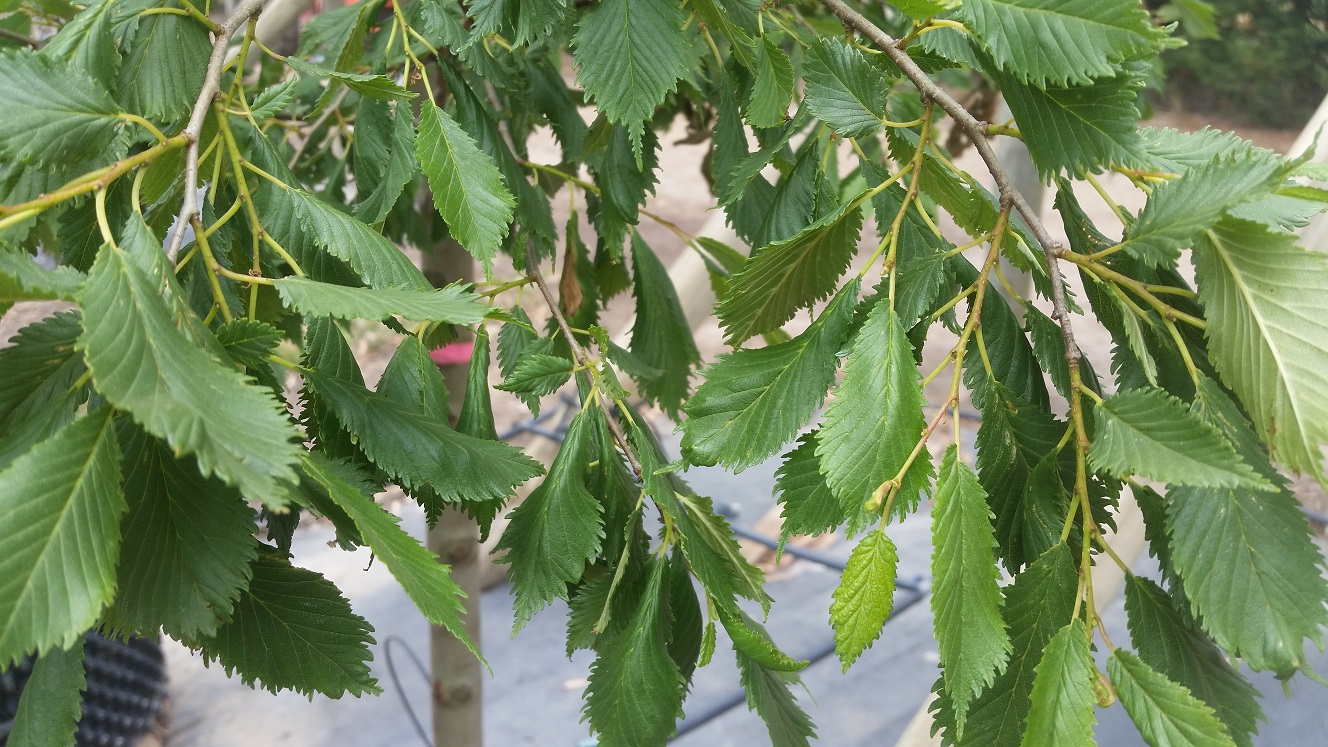
Same

== Pests and diseases ==
'Viminalis' is very susceptible to Dutch elm disease, as are the natural hybrids between field elm and plot elm (Melville's U. × viminalis), of which the type cultivar is usually considered an example.

== Cultivation ==
'Viminalis' was valued for its ornamental qualities, Wood (1851) considering it "well adapted for the back part of shrubberies". Bean (1936) called it "a charming small tree for gardens, very elegant and not growing fast", while the catalogue of Hillier & Sons, Winchester, Hampshire, (1958) described it as "an extremely graceful, slender tree of slow growth, easily distinguished from all other elms by its narrow, fimbriated leaves". Kirchner noted that the tree is not sensitive to frost. Specimens were present in many of the major UK collections, including Cambridge University Botanic Garden (see 'Notable trees' below), Kew Gardens (35 ft., 1913), Westonbirt Arboretum (49 ft., 1927), Royal Victoria Park, Bath (1857, 1905), and Ryston Hall arboretum, Norfolk (planted as U. antarctica, 1914). 'Viminalis' remained in the catalogues of the Hillier nursery, Winchester, till the 1960s.

Introduced to North America, Ulmus viminalis, 'slender-twigged elm', was marketed by Hovey's nursery of Boston, Massachusetts, from the 1850s, and by the Mount Hope Nursery (also known as Ellwanger and Barry) of Rochester, New York, from c.1860. In continental Europe, North America and Australasia a few specimens survive in arboreta and avenues. One tree 40 feet (12 m) in height, determined as U. × viminalis Loud. by Melville, stood by the lake at the Royal Botanic Gardens, Melbourne, in 1953. It may have been the Ulmus viminalis specimen present in the Gardens in 1877. In the UK one mature tree survives (2026), in Withdean Park, Brighton and Hove. A second, in Longhill School, Rottingdean, died in 2016, and a third, near Lewes Rd, Brighton University, c.2019. The tree remains in cultivation in Australia.

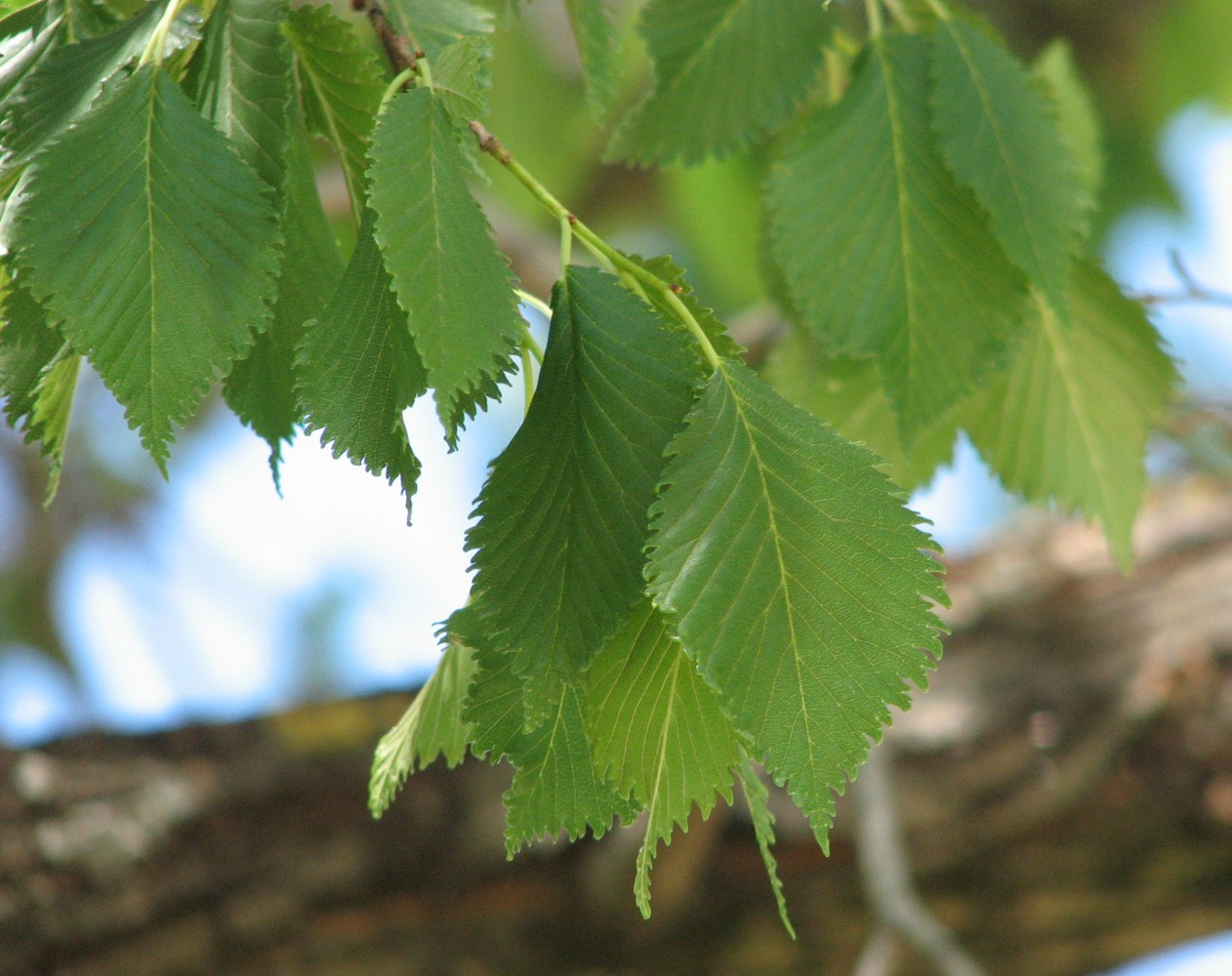
Leaves of Benalla U. 'Viminalis'

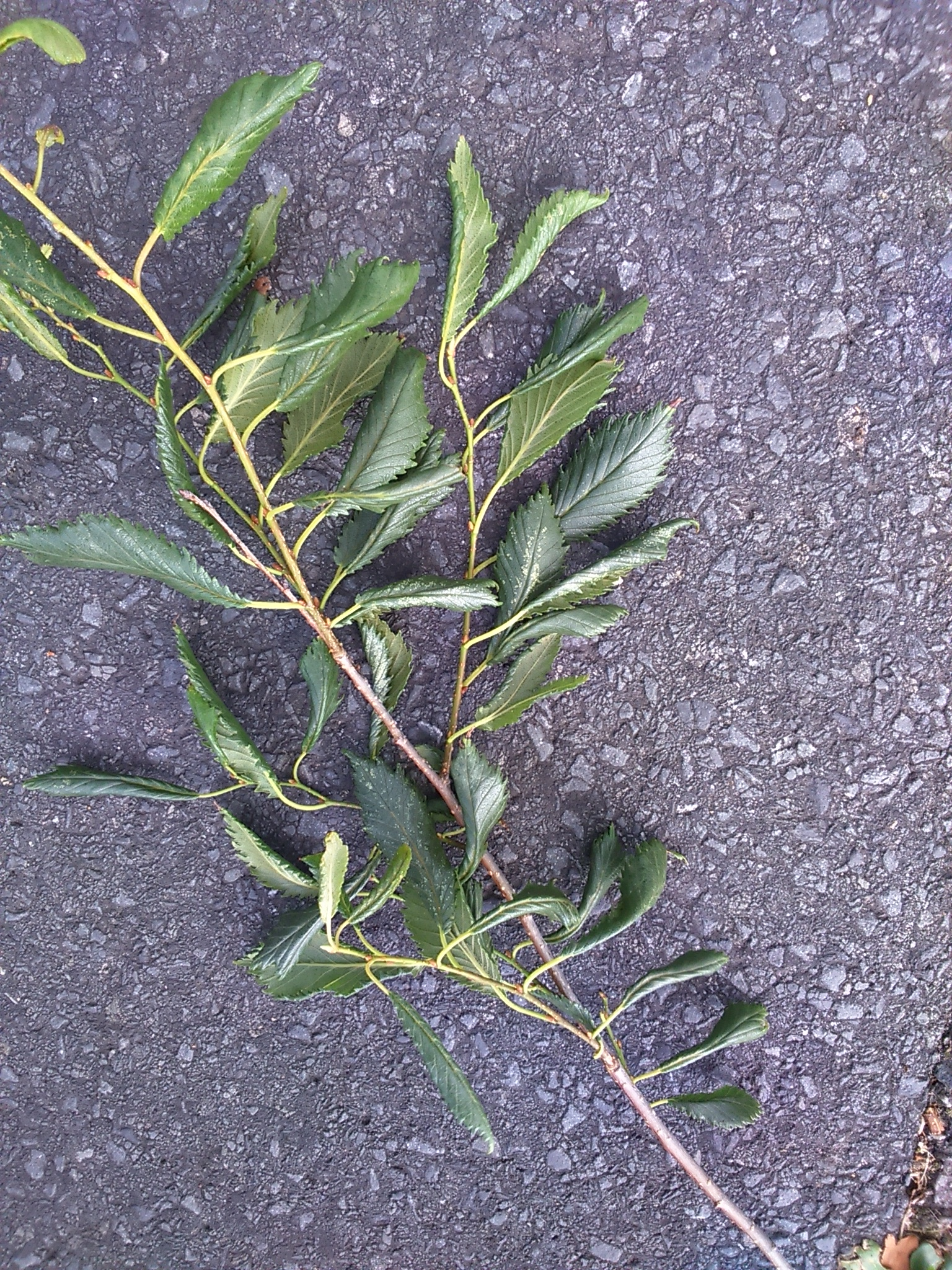
Spray of leaves from Rottingdean tree

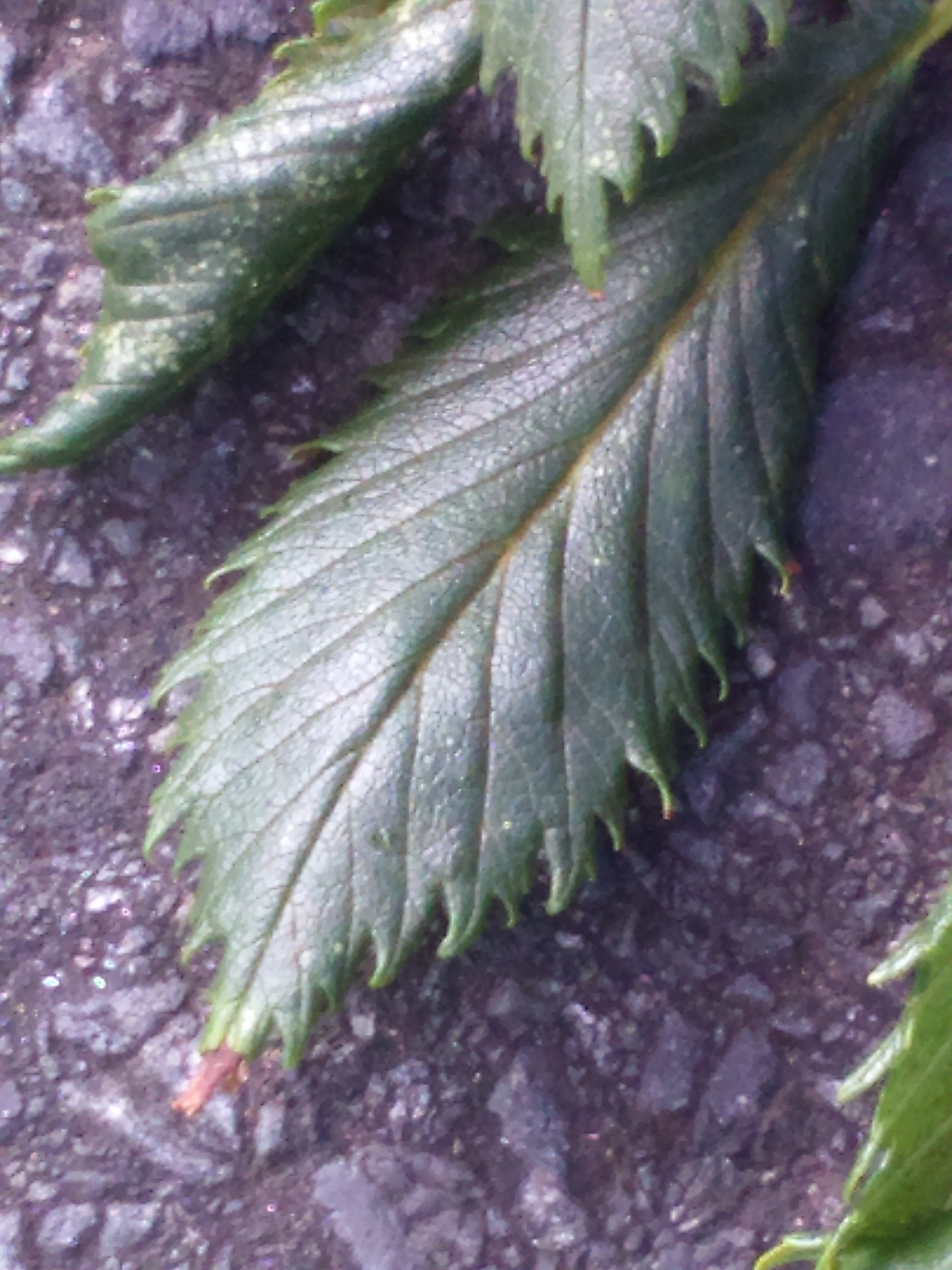
Leaf from Rottingdean tree

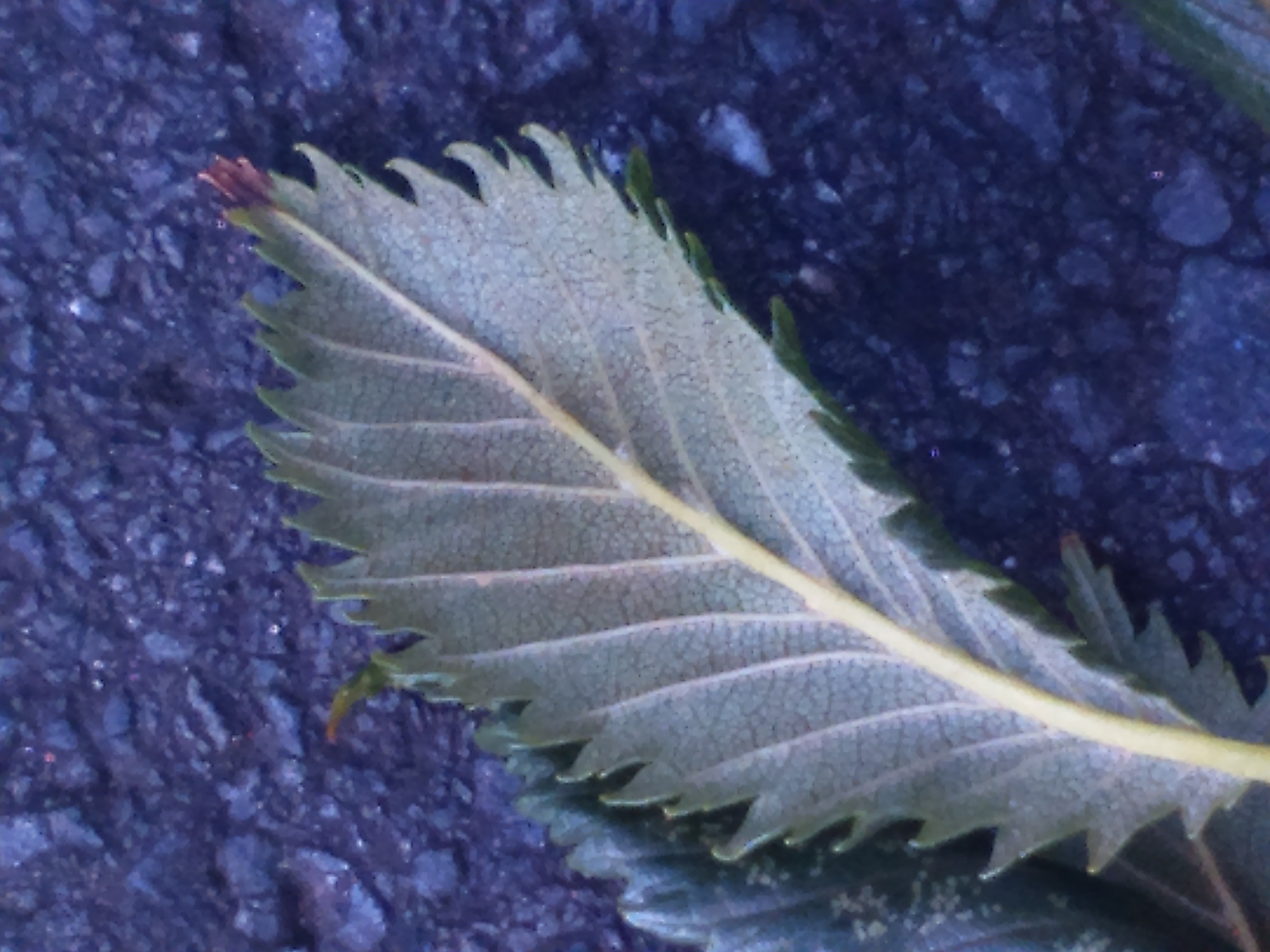
Underside of same

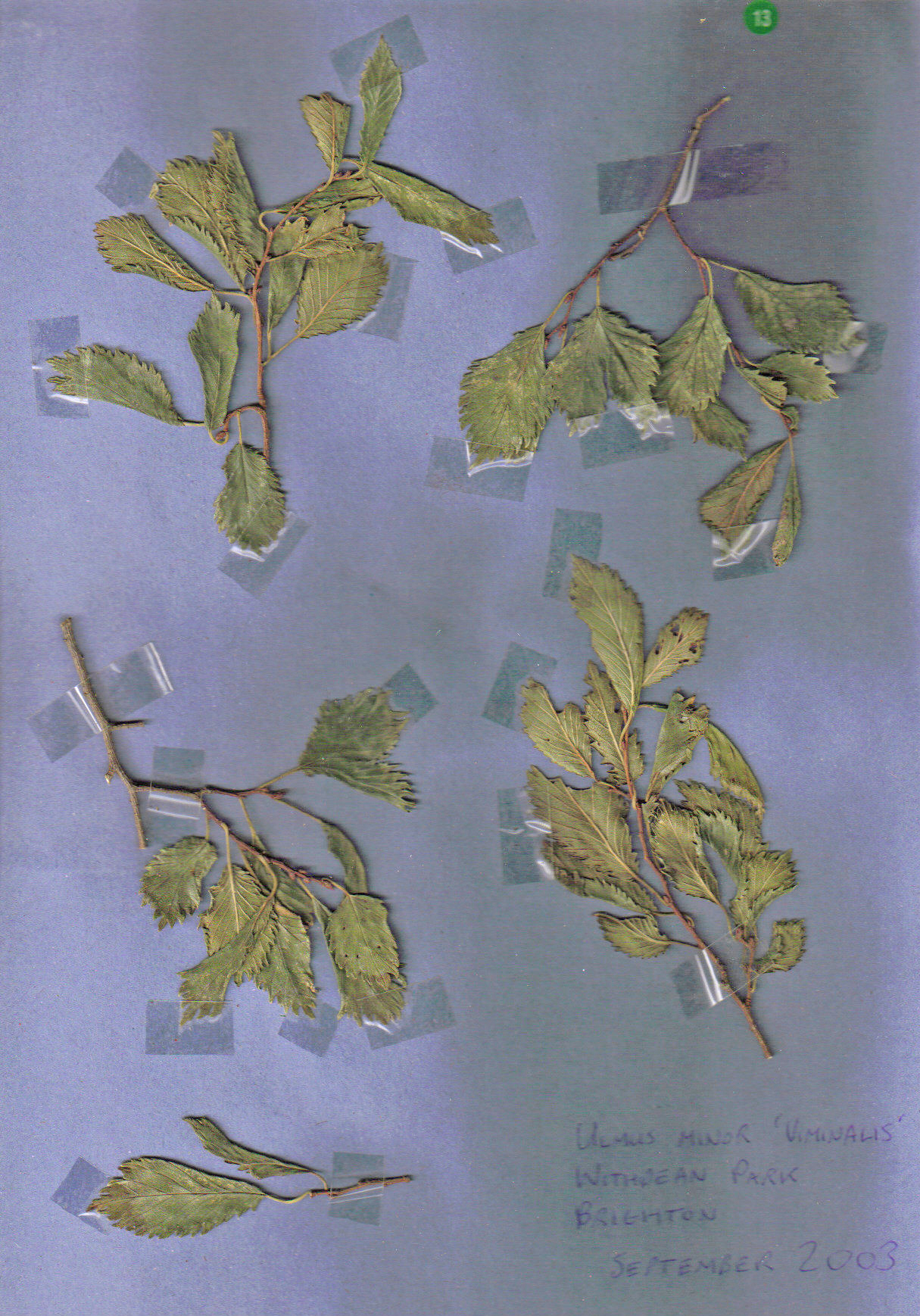
Dried leaves of Withdean Park 'Viminalis', Brighton

== Notable trees ==
Elwes and Henry list notable specimens "of this variety" (the type tree described and illustrated) in the Cambridge University Botanic Garden (70 ft) and in Gisselfeld Park, Denmark (60 ft). Three trees labelled U. 'Viminalis', pollarded in 1984, stand in Benalla Botanic Gardens, Australia. An old specimen of the same cultivar, apparently unpollarded, stands in Lydiard Street, Ballarat, Victoria. The last known (2026) non-variegated 'Viminalis' in Europe is the specimen in Withdean Park, Brighton.

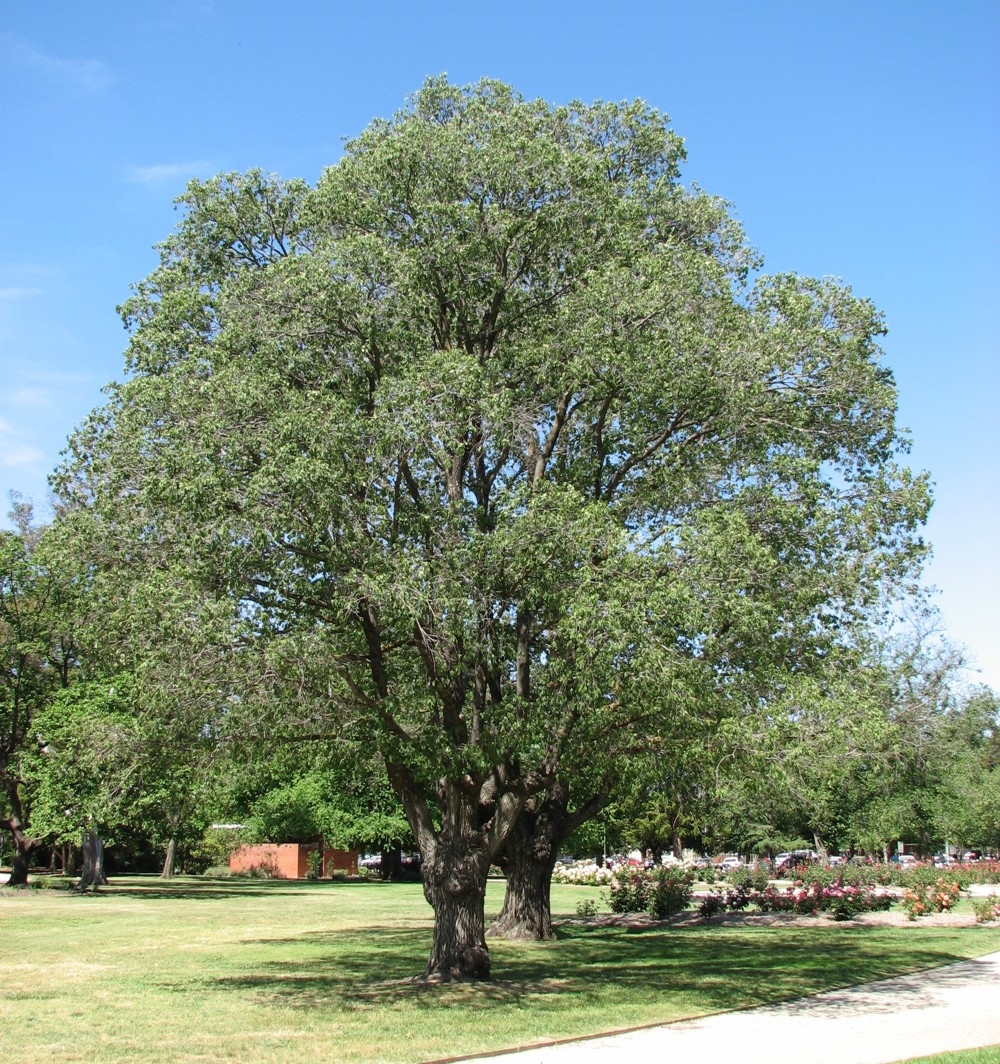
Two pollarded U. 'Viminalis', Benalla Botanic Gardens, Australia (2006)

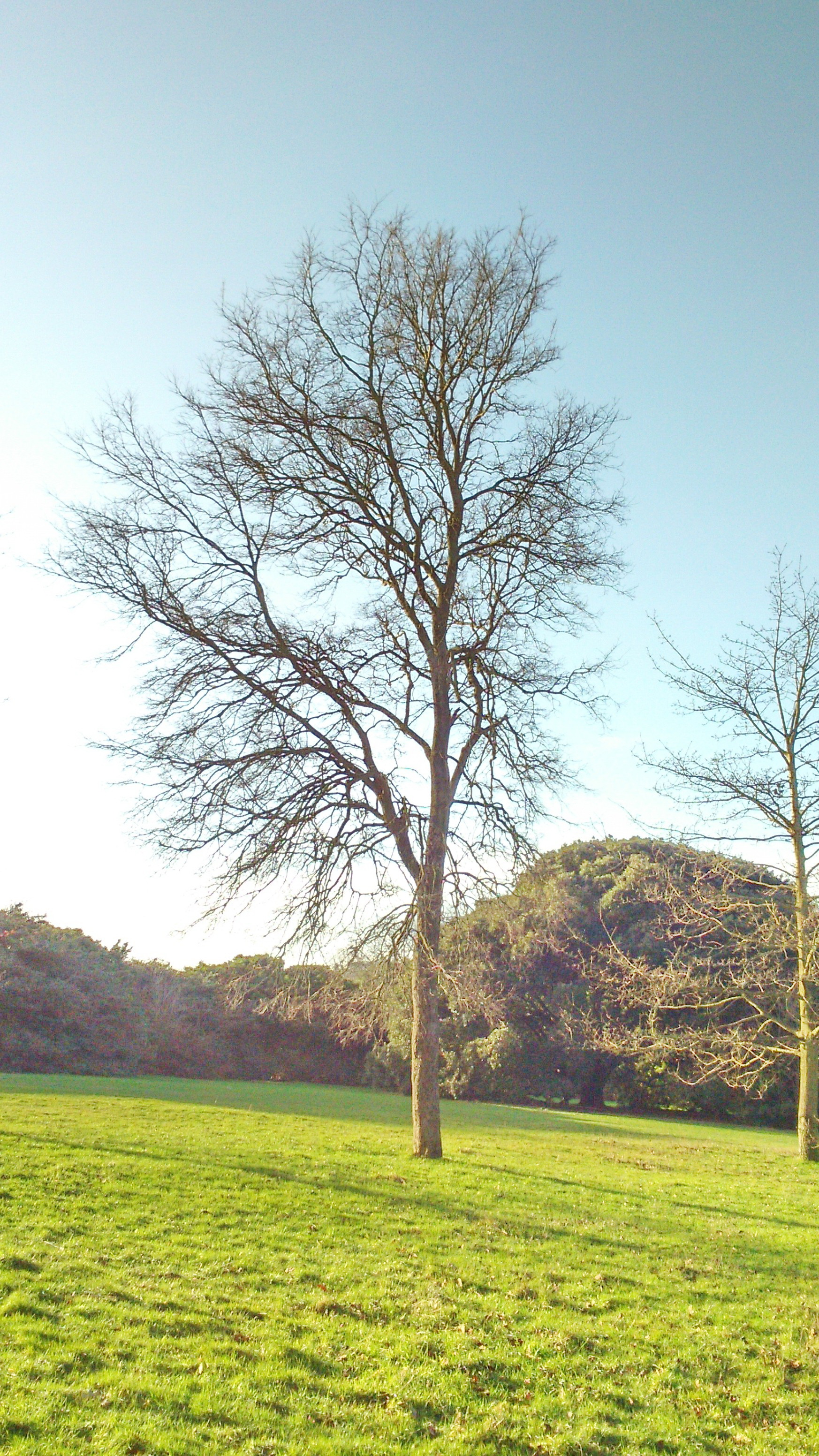
Withdean Park 'Viminalis', Brighton (2015)

== Cultivars ==
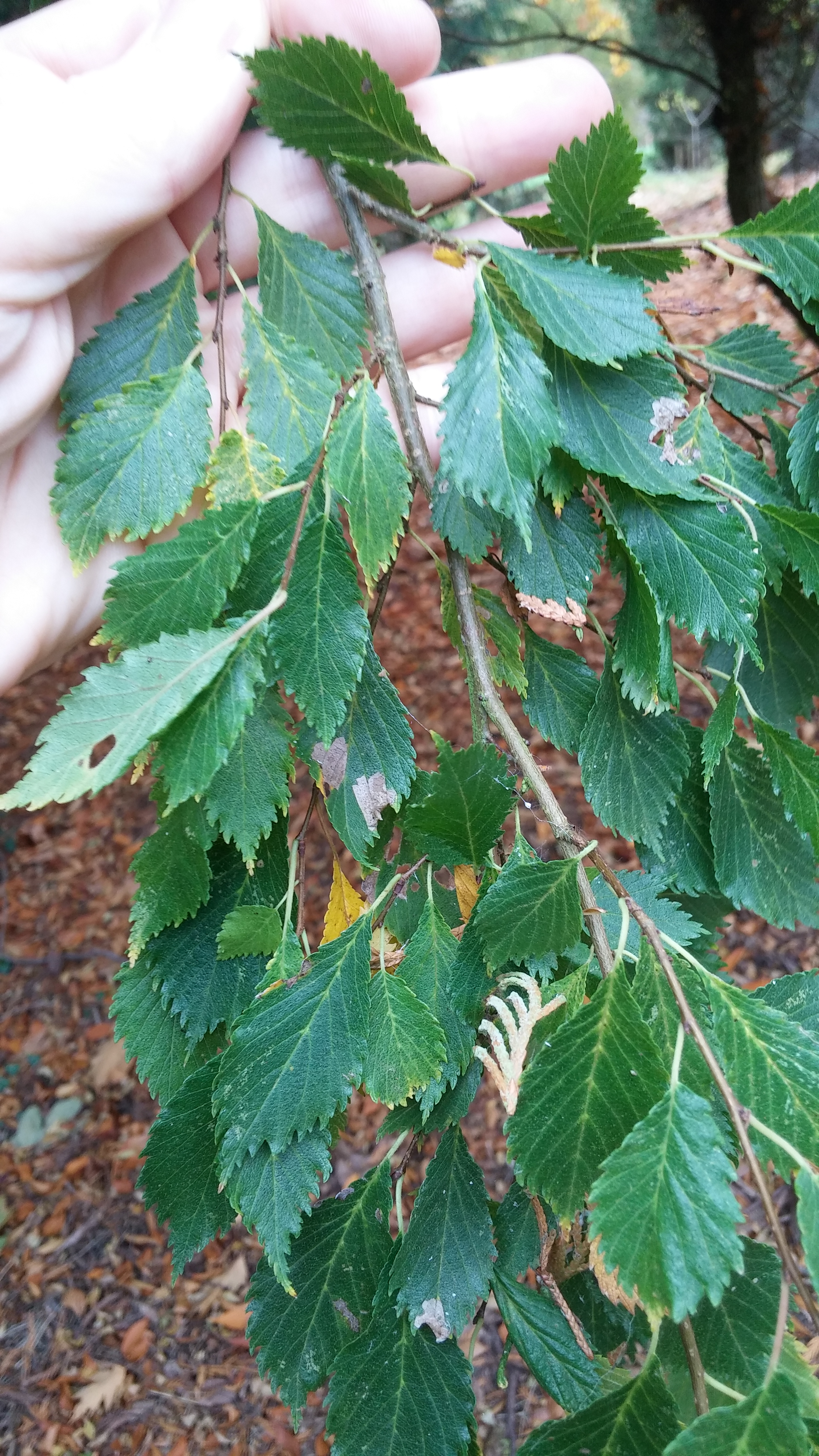
Reverted branchlet of variegated 'Viminalis', Batsford Arboretum

Cultivars include both sports of the type tree and elms similar enough to have been conjectured as related to it:

- Viminalis Aurea, Viminalis Gracilis, Viminalis Incisa, Viminalis Marginata, Viminalis Pendula, Viminalis Pulverulenta, Viminalis Stricta.

== Synonymy ==
- Ulmus antarctica Hort..
- Ulmus campestris antarctica.
- Ulmus campestris 'Betulinoides'.
- Ulmus campestris var. betulaefolia.
- U. campestris var. laciniata.
- U. campestris var. microphylla pendula Hort. as in synonymy.
- Ulmus campestris var. nuda subvar. incisa Hort.Vilv.. Considered "possibly U. viminalis" by Green (1964).
- Ulmus campestris var. stricta.
- Ulmus campestris var. virginalis in synonymy.
- ? Ulmus campestris viminalis stricta.
- Ulmus gracilis Hort..
- Ulmus 'Masters's Twiggy'.
- Ulmus montana viminalis marmorata Hort..
- Ulmus scabra viminalis gracilis Hort..
- Ulmus scabra viminalis pulverulenta Hort..
- Ulmus suberosa betuloides Hort..
- Ulmus viminalis Lodd.
- Ulmus viminalis pendula.

== Accessions ==
=== North America ===
- Arnold Arboretum, US. Acc. no. 499–53

=== Europe ===
- Brighton & Hove City Council, UK. NCCPG Elm collection. UK champion: Upper Larkrise Wood, 23 m high, 50 cm d.b.h., last surveyed in 1995.
- Cambridge Botanic Garden , University of Cambridge, UK. No details available.

=== Australasia ===
- Benalla Botanic Gardens, Australia. Three specimens; listed on the Significant Tree Register of the National Trust.

== Pseudo-'Viminalis' and 'Viminalis'-like elms ==
Not all clones named 'Viminalis' match the named cultivars above. Three specimens supplied by the Späth nursery to the Royal Botanic Garden Edinburgh in 1902 as Ulmus campestris viminalis were determined by Melville in 1958 as U. viminalis Lodd but "not the usual nothomorph". One stood in the Garden itself till the late 20th century; the other two may survive in Edinburgh, as it was the practice of the Garden to distribute trees about the city. An old cultivar with leaves that appear to match herbarium specimens of Späth's U. campestris viminalis stands (2018) in the middle of North Walk, The Meadows, Edinburgh (see gallery); a second, possibly the same clone and age, in the grounds of Holyrood Palace (both trees lost their crowns in a 2016 gale and are regenerating). The Ulmus campestris viminalis supplied by Späth and planted in 1897 at the Dominion Arboretum, Ottawa, Canada, is likely to have been this clone (not to be confused with Späth's U. × hollandica 'Viminalis').

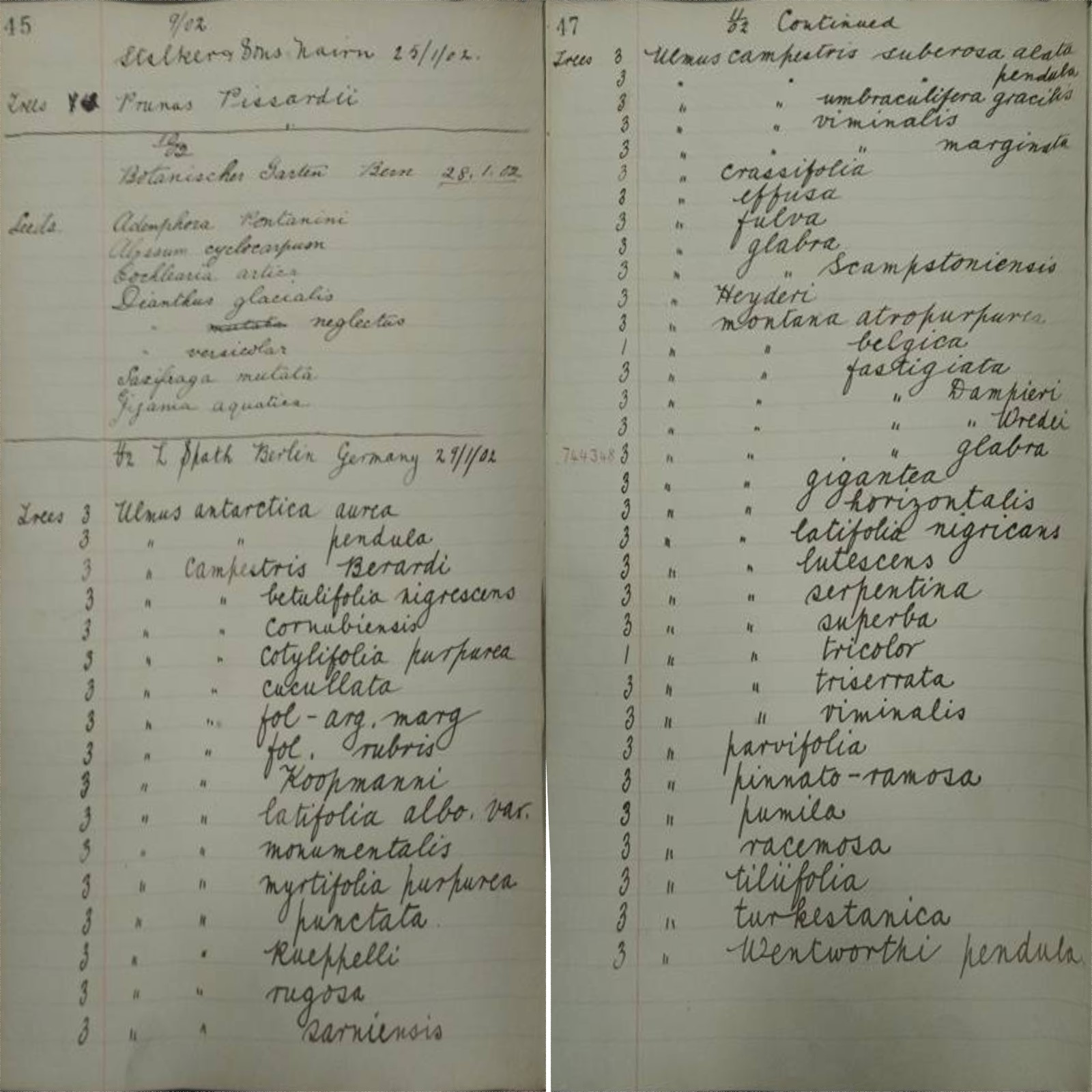
U. campestris viminalis from Späth, in the RBGE Accessions Book

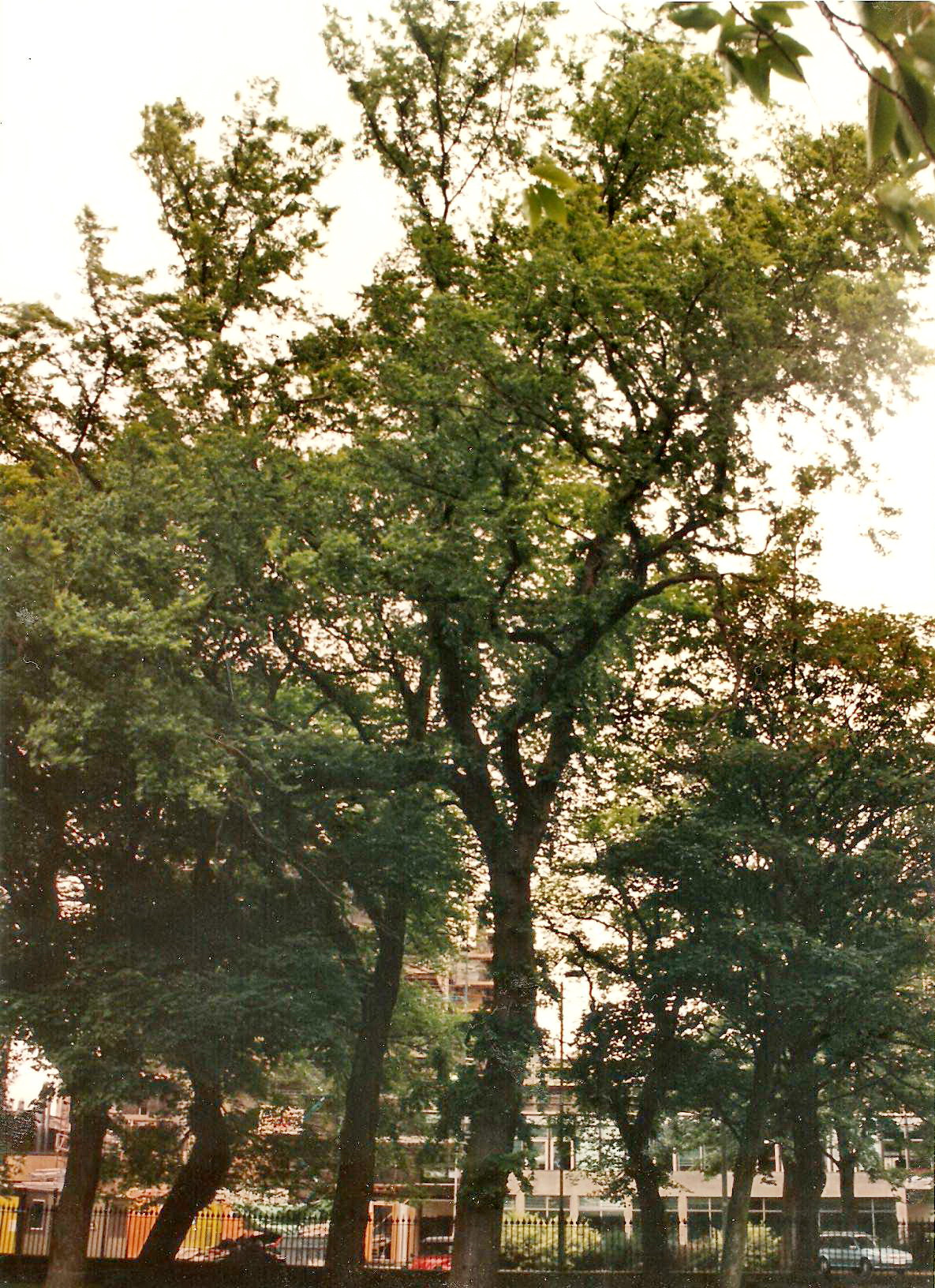
Putative U. campestris viminalis (Späth), The Meadows, Edinburgh (1989)

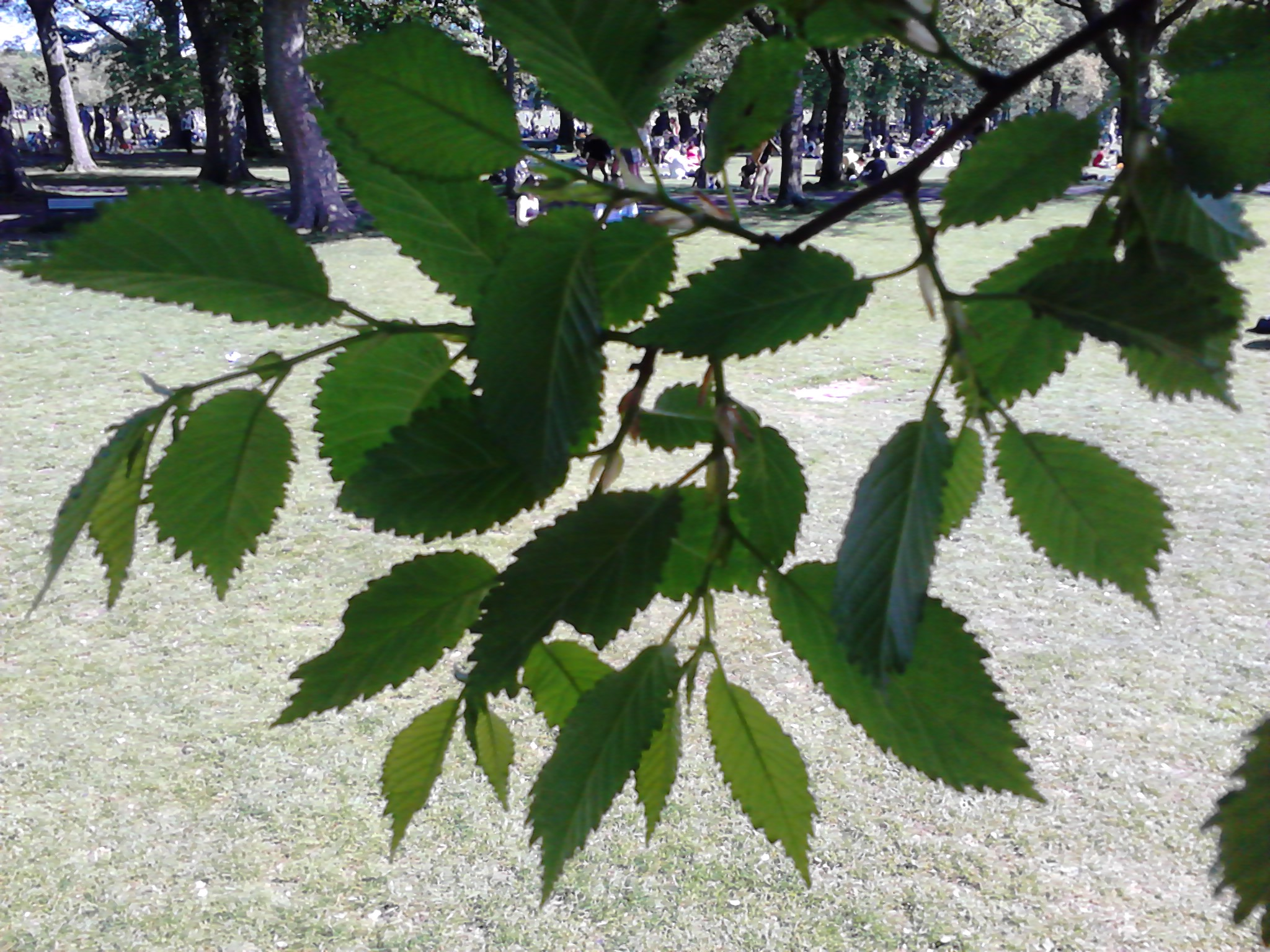
Leaves of putative U. campestris viminalis (Späth), The Meadows, Edinburgh (2017)

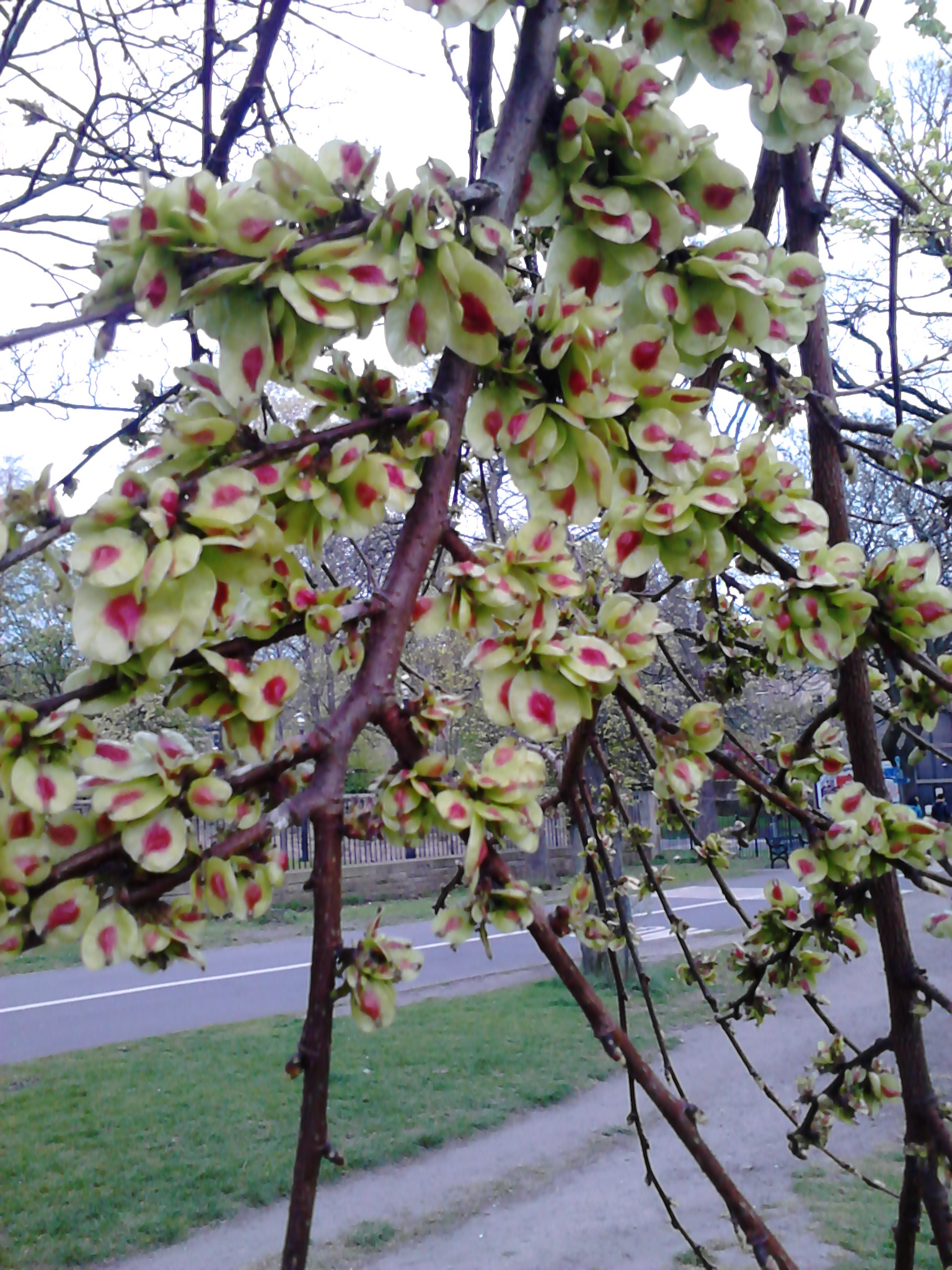
Samarae of Edinburgh tree

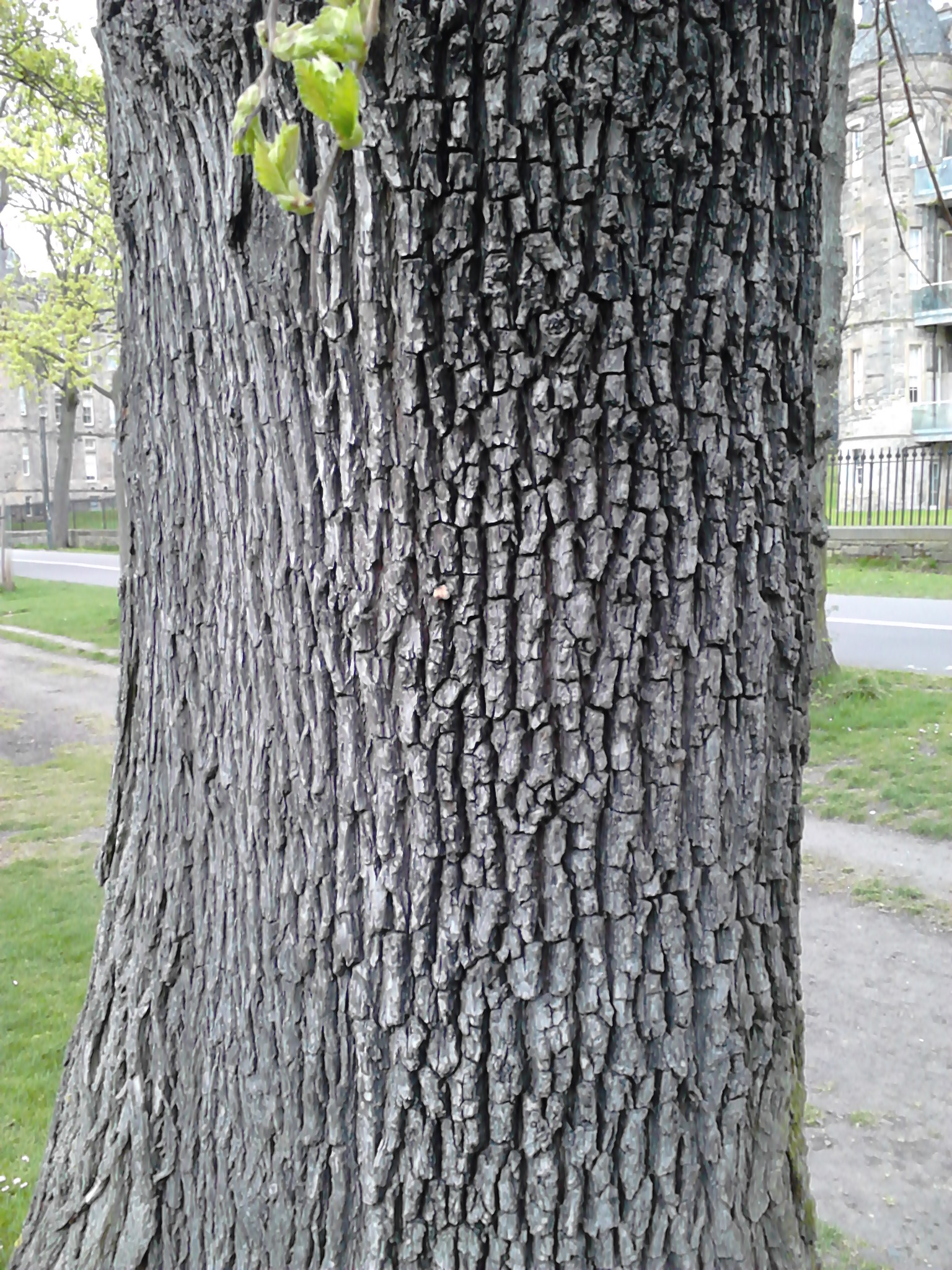
Bark of Edinburgh tree

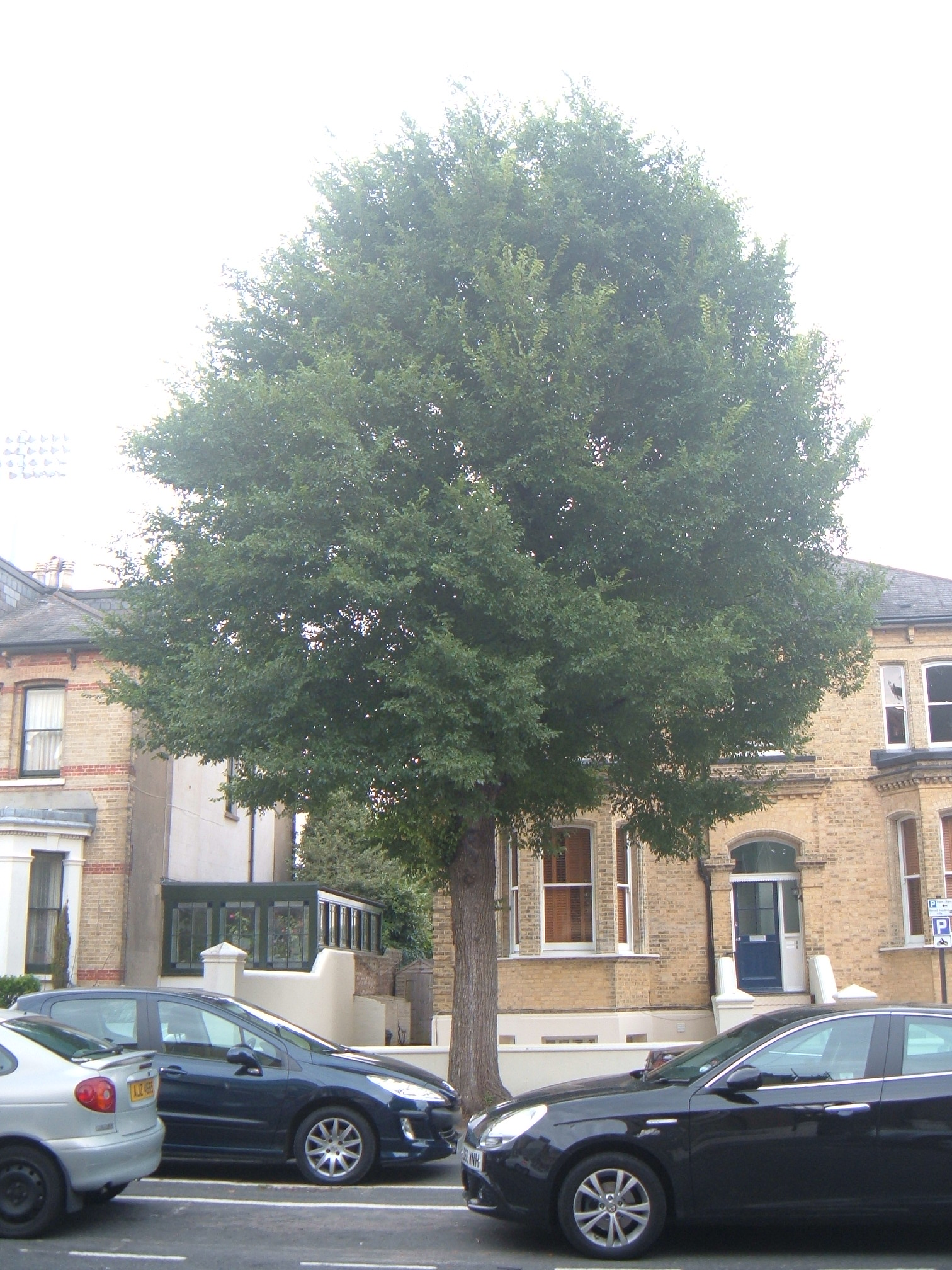
A 'Viminalis'-like elm in Hove

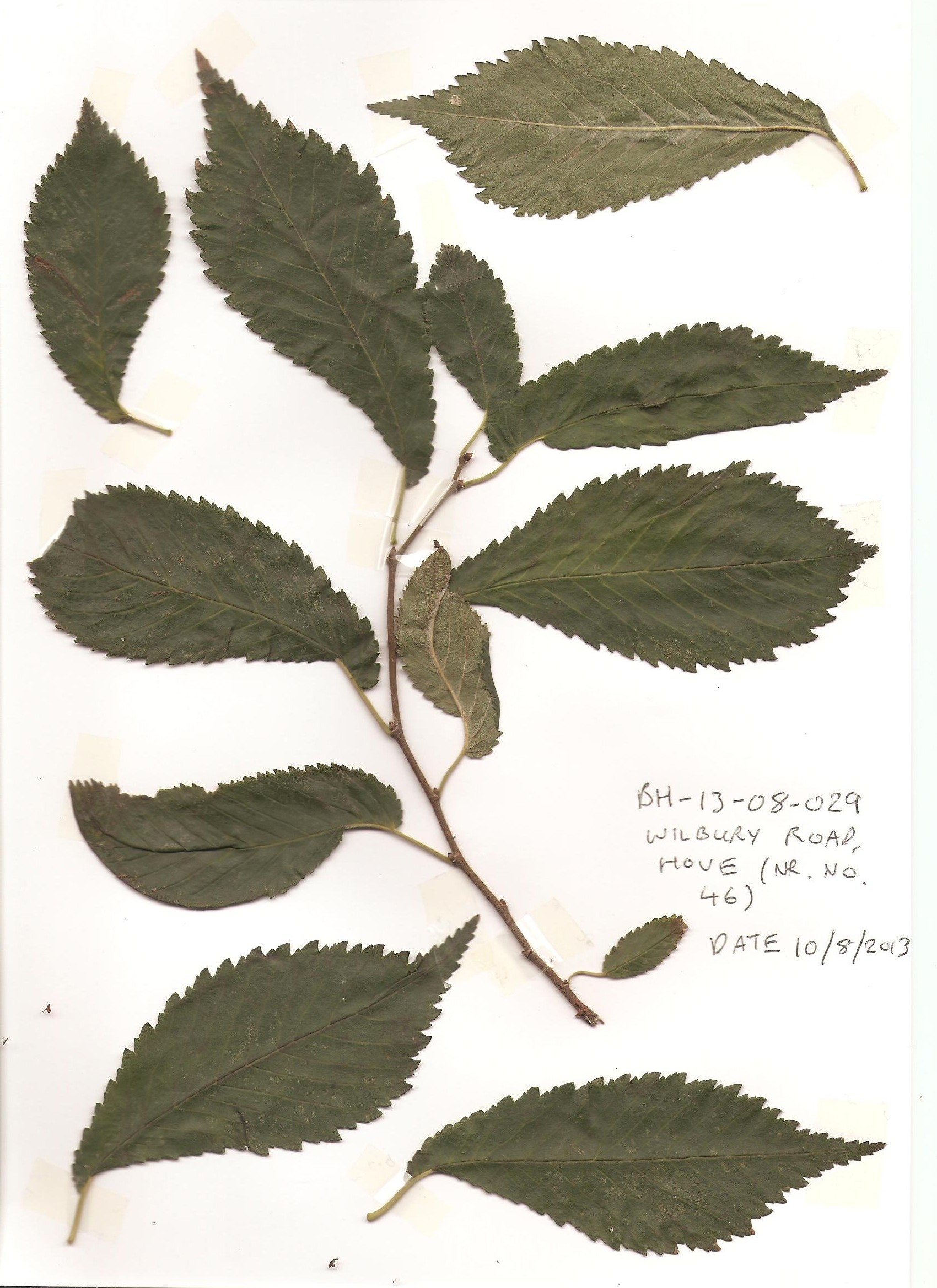
Pressed leaves of Hove tree

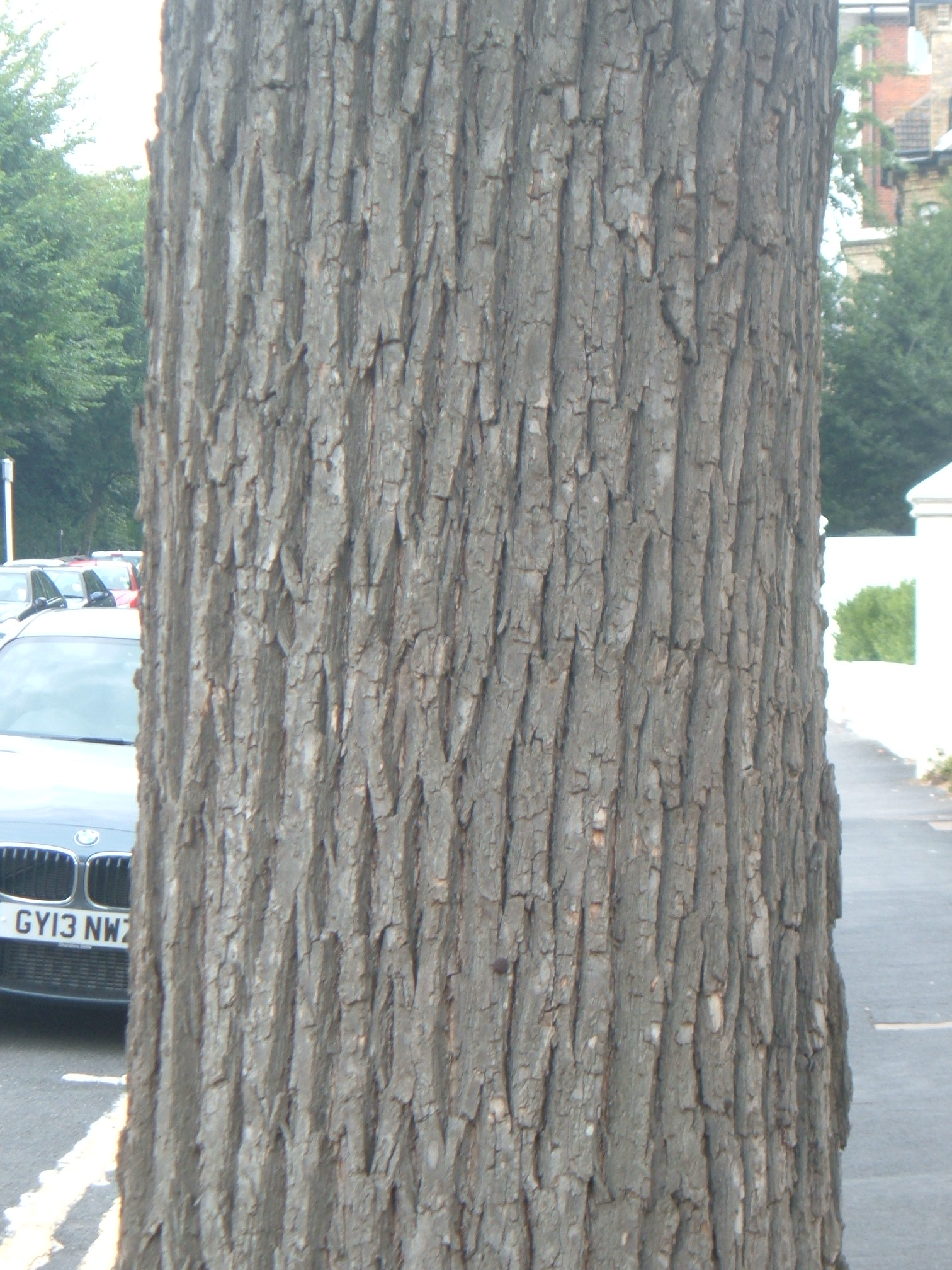
Bark of Hove tree

'Viminalis'-like elms, with small lanceolate long-petioled leaves tapering gradually at the base, are present in some English herbaria. A number of old non-ornamental trees believed to belong to Melville's U. × viminalis group survive (2015) in a wood in Mepal, Cambridgeshire.

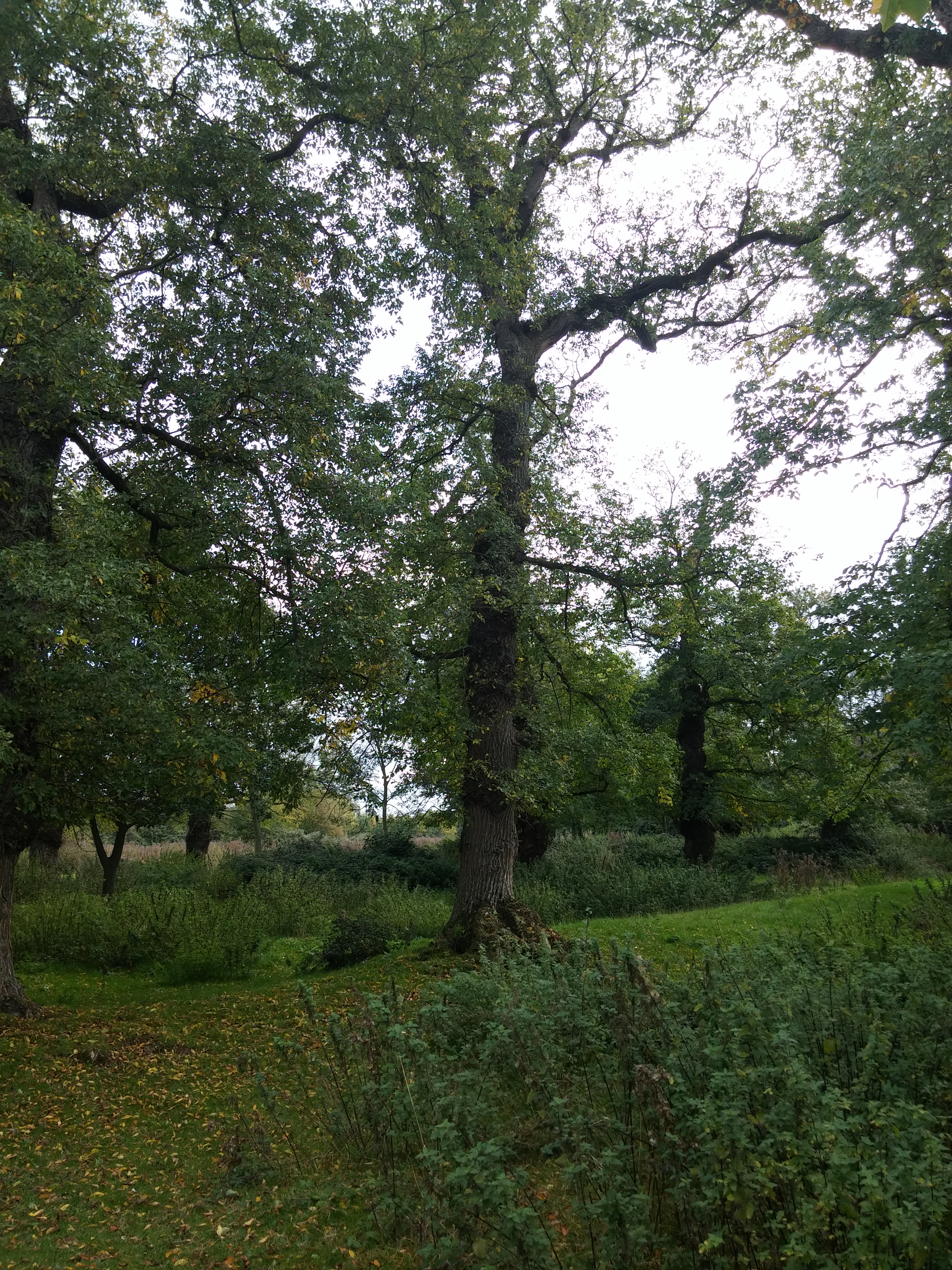
Non-ornamental U. × viminalis, Mepal, Cambridgeshire

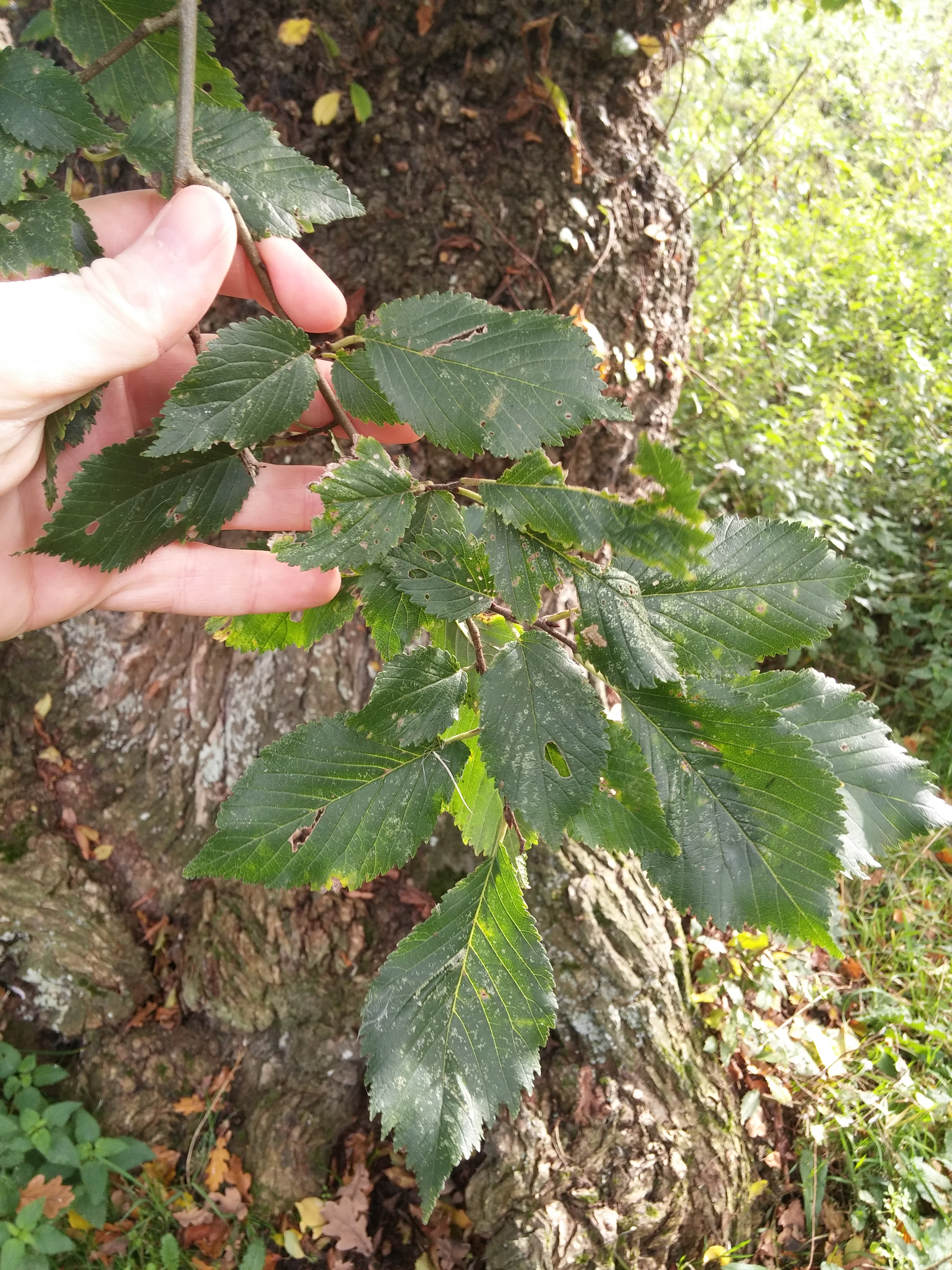
Leaves of non-ornamental U. × viminalis, Mepal, Cambridgeshire

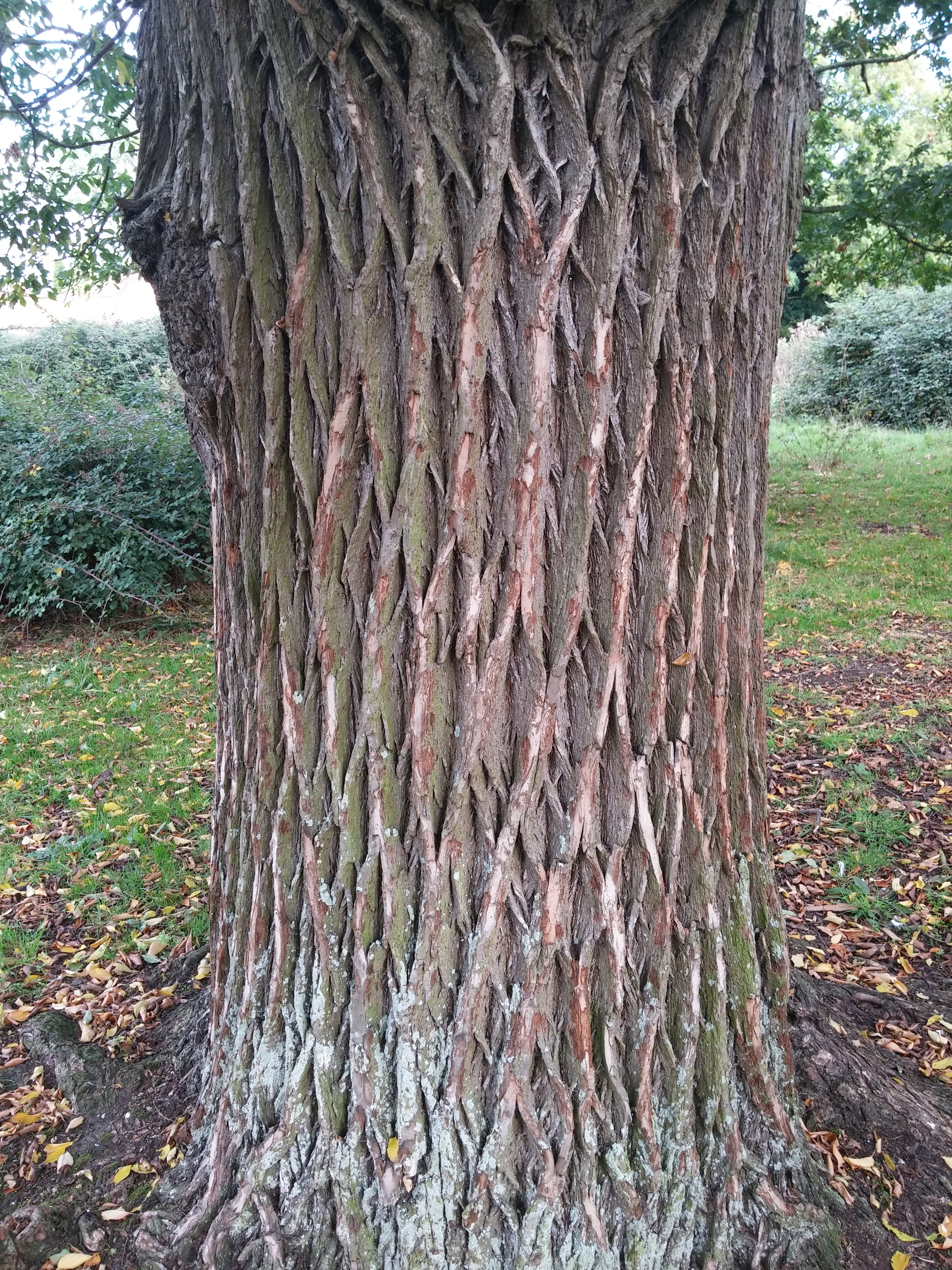
Bark of non-ornamental U. × viminalis, Mepal, Cambridgeshire
