= Ulmus minor 'Viminalis Aurea' =

Elm cultivar

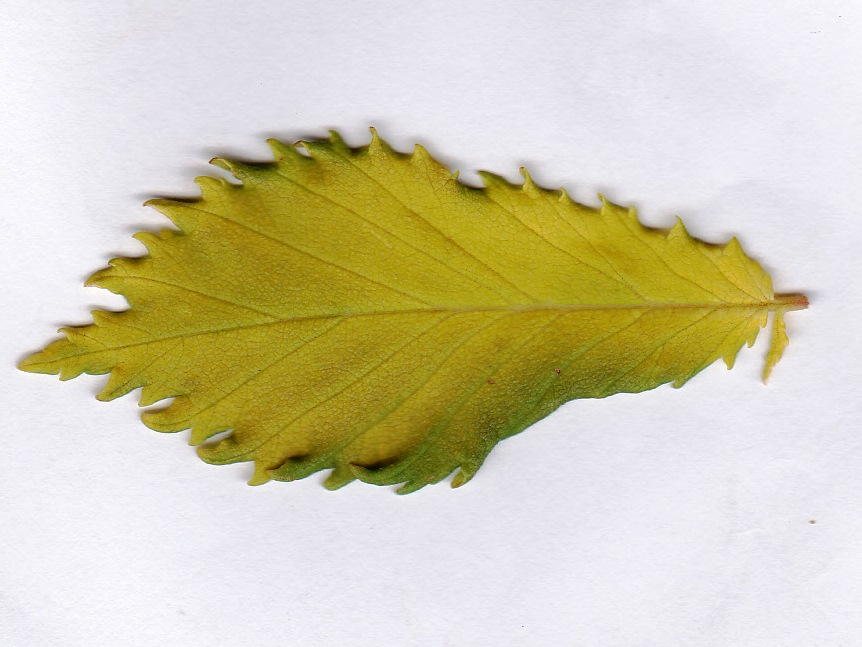
- Species: Ulmus minor
- Cultivar: 'Viminalis Aurea'
- Origin: Louvain, Belgium

The Field Elm cultivar Ulmus minor 'Viminalis Aurea', probably a "golden" form of Ulmus minor 'Viminalis', was raised before 1866 by Egide Rosseels of Louvain, who was known to have supplied 'Viminalis'.

== Description ==
The tree is distinguished by its 'Viminalis'-type leaves (4–7 cm x 3 cm) suffused golden yellow in early summer, greening as the season progresses. Clibran's of Altrincham (see 'Cultivation') described the coloration as "golden-bronze". Rehder noted that 'Viminalis Aurea' has been distinguished from 'Viminalis' by the more deeply incised usually obovate leaves, but the two forms of leaves pass gradually into each other and may be found even on the same plant.

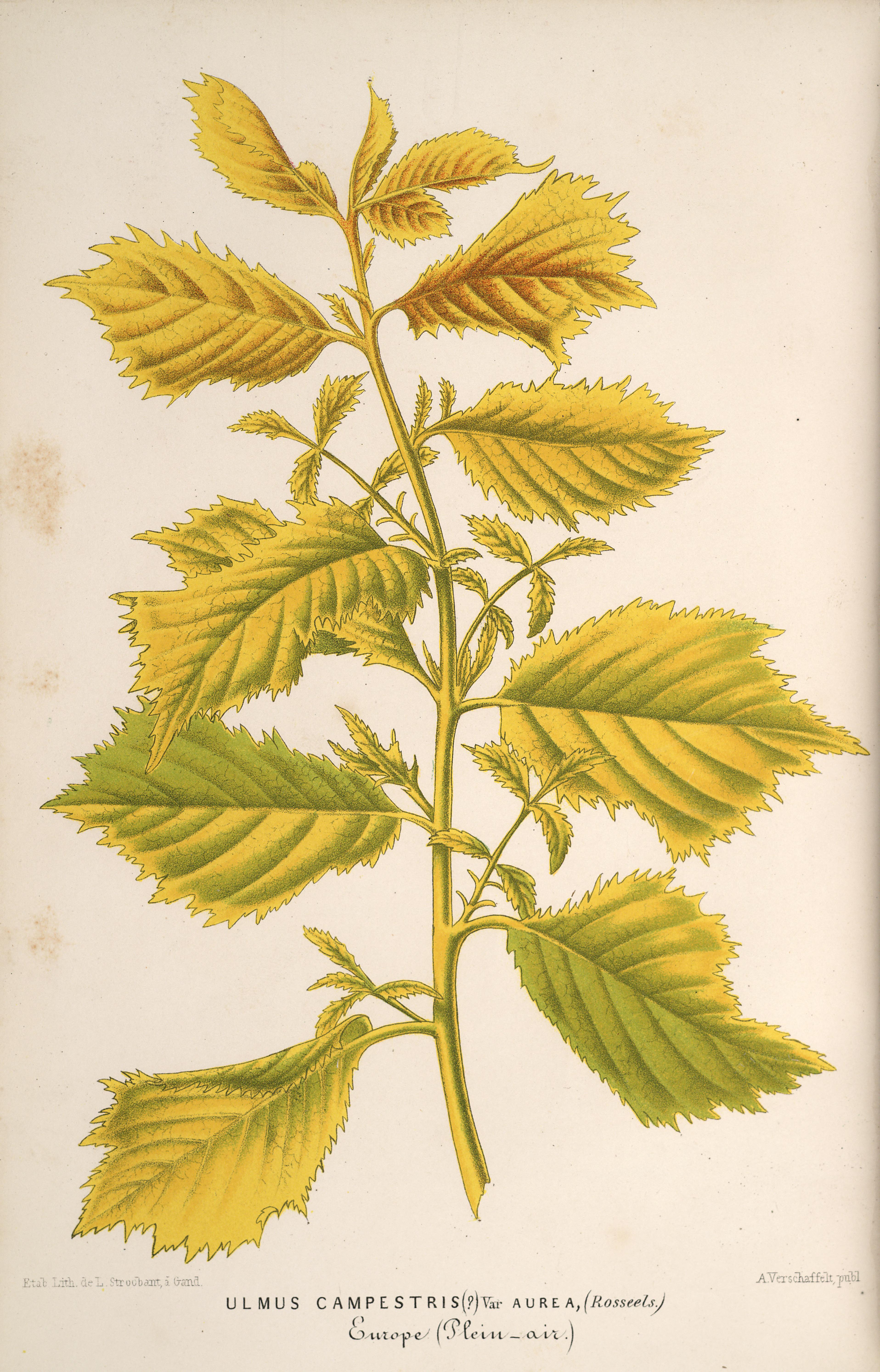
Illustration of 'Aurea', 1866

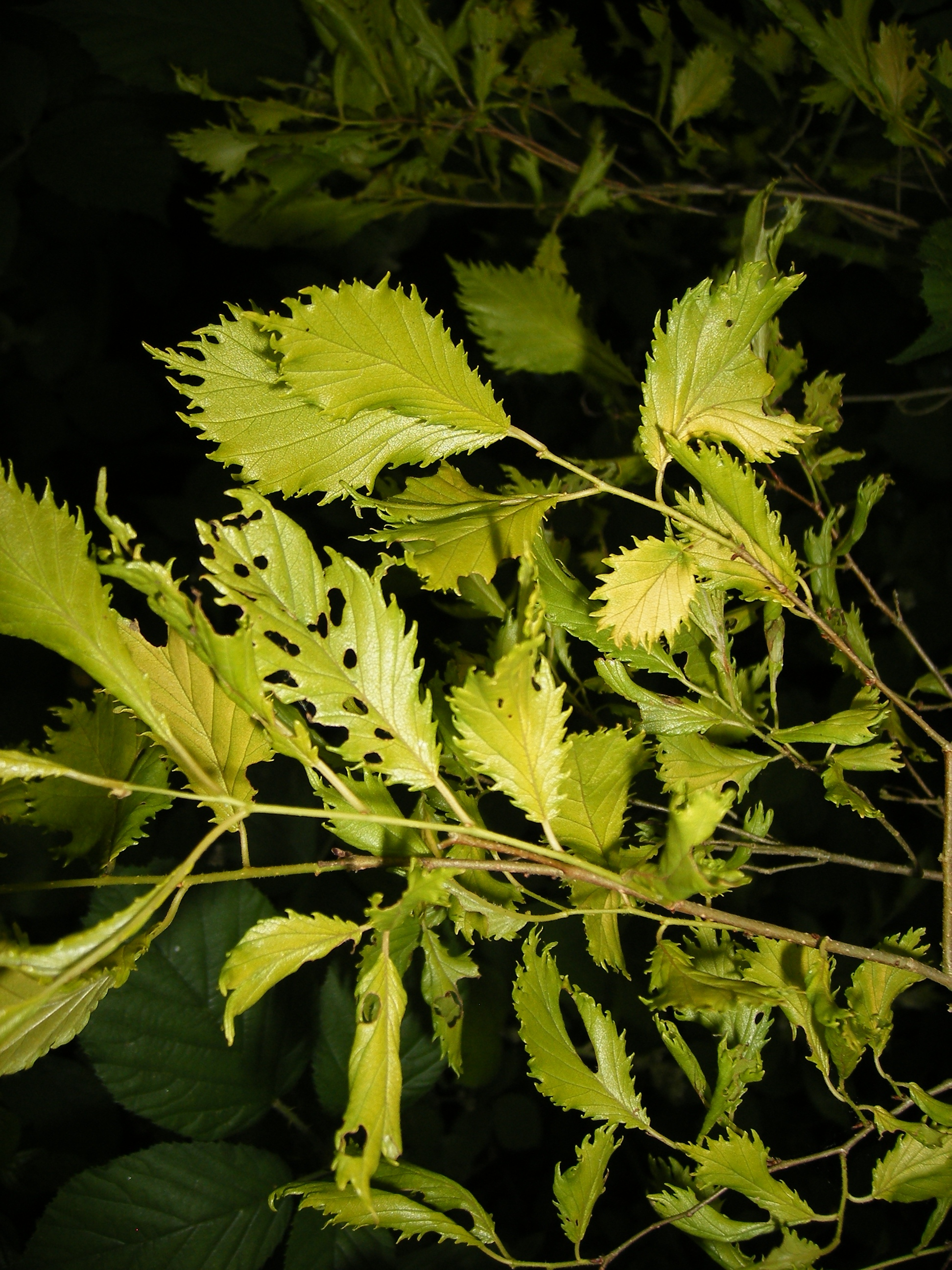
'Aurea' at Borde Hill, West Sussex, 2010.

== Pests and diseases ==
'Viminalis Aurea' is very susceptible to Dutch elm disease.

== Cultivation ==
One tree supplied by the Späth nursery of Berlin was planted in 1899 at the Dominion Arboretum, Ottawa, Canada, as U. campestris antarctica aurea. Three specimens were supplied by Späth to the Royal Botanic Garden Edinburgh in 1902 as U. antarctica aurea, and may survive in Edinburgh as it was the practice of the Garden to distribute trees about the city (viz. the Wentworth Elm). The current list of Living Accessions held in the Garden per se does not list the plant. In England the tree was supplied by Clibrans' nursery of Altrincham, Cheshire, as Ulmus campestris aurea Rosseelsii. Only two specimens are known (2016) to survive in the UK, a stunted tree at Borde Hill, West Sussex. and a small tree (2016) at Grange Farm Arboretum (see Accessions). Others are known in Europe and Australasia (see Accessions).

== Synonymy ==
- Ulmus antarctica aurea: Späth nursery
- Ulmus campestris var. antarctica aurea: Nicholson, Kew Hand List Trees & Shrubs, ii, 613, 1902.
- Ulmus campestris var. aurea: Morren: La Belgique horticole, p. 356, 1866, (coloured plate), and Lemaire: L'Illustration horticole t 513, 1867.
- Ulmus campestris var. Rosscelsii: Schelle, in Beissner et al., Handbuch der Laubholz-Benennung 83. 1903, = misspelling of Rosseelsii.
- Ulmus rosseelsii: Koch, Dendrologie; Bäume, Sträucher und Halbsträucher, welche in Mittel- und Nord- Europa im Freien kultivirt werden 2 (1): 412, 1872, in synonymy.

== Accessions ==
North America

None known.

Europe

- Borde Hill Garden, Haywards Heath, UK. Acc. no. 47334 (As Ulmus minor 'Viminalis Aurea').
- Grange Farm Arboretum, Sutton St James, Spalding, Lincolnshire, UK. Acc. no. 1102.
- University of Copenhagen Botanic Garden, Denmark. As Ulmus procera 'Viminalis Aurea'.

Australasia

- Waite Arboretum, University of Adelaide, Adelaide, Australia

== Nurseries ==
North America

- ForestFarm Nurseries , Williams, Oregon, US.

Europe

- Arboretum Waasland, Nieuwkerken-Waas, Belgium.
- Czeczot Krzewy , Bogumiłowice, Poland.
- Szkółka Krzewów Ozdobnych , Bielsko-Biała, Poland.
- Szkółki Konieczko , Gogolin, Poland.
