= Ulmus minor 'Viminalis Stricta' =

Elm cultivar

- Species: Ulmus minor
- Cultivar: 'Stricta'

The Field Elm cultivar Ulmus minor 'Viminalis Stricta' (:'narrow'), formerly known as U. campestris var. viminalis stricta, is a fastigiate form of Ulmus minor 'Viminalis'. A herbarium specimen at Kew labelled U. campestris var. viminalis f. stricta was considered by Melville a form of his U. × viminalis.

== Description ==
A tree of narrow and "very rigid" growth. A herbarium leaf-specimen shows a leaf resembling that of the type tree, 'Viminalis'.

== Pests and diseases ==
Trees of the U. minor 'Viminalis' group are very susceptible to Dutch elm disease.

== Cultivation ==
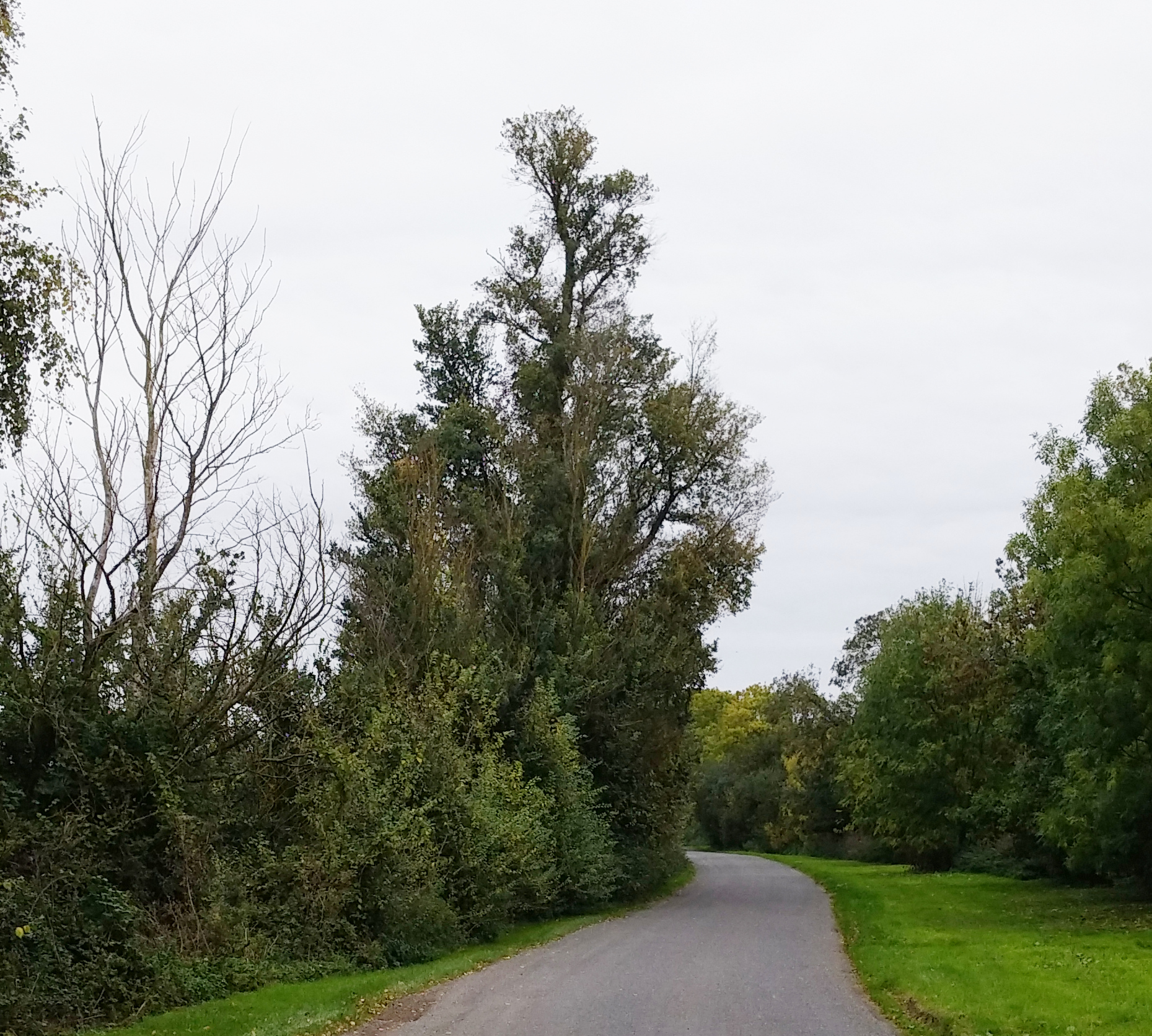
A narrow, rigid form of Melville's U. × viminalis, Easton, Cambridgeshire (2015)

No specimens are known to survive. There was a 'Viminals Stricta' at Kew Gardens in the early 20th century.

Non-ornamental trees identified as Melville's U. × viminalis and matching the form of 'Stricta' occur in East Anglia.

== Notable trees ==
A fine specimen noted by Henry at Milton Abbey, Dorset, in 1913 of what he called U. campestris var. viminalis, which "resembled in habit the Cornish elm", may have been a form of U. minor 'Viminalis' similar to 'Stricta'.
