= Ulmus minor 'Viminalis Pulverulenta' =

Elm cultivar

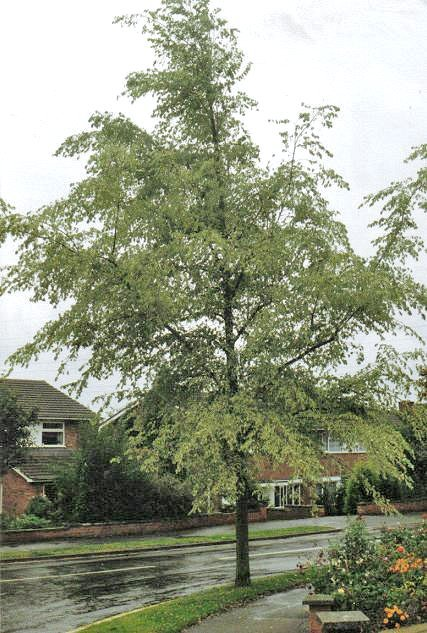
- 'Pulverulenta', Bedford, UK. 1991
- Species: Ulmus minor
- Cultivar: 'Pulverulenta'
- Origin: Europe

The Field Elm cultivar Ulmus minor 'Viminalis Pulverulenta' (:'powdery'), also known as 'Viminalis Variegata', a variegated form of U. minor 'Viminalis', was first mentioned by Dieck, (Zöschen, Germany) in 1885 as U. scabra viminalis pulverulenta Hort., but without description. Nursery, arboretum, and herbarium specimens confirm that this cultivar was sometimes regarded as synonymous with U. minor 'Viminalis Marginata' (see Cultivation), first listed in 1864, which is variegated mostly on the leaf margin. It is likely, however, that 'Pulverulenta' was the U. 'Viminalis Variegata', Variegated Twiggy-branched elm, that was listed and described by John Frederick Wood, F.H.S., in The Midland Florist and Suburban Horticulturist 1847 and 1851, pre-dating both Kirchner and Dieck. Wood did not specify the nature of the variegation.

== Description ==
Dippel (1892) described 'Viminalis Pulverulenta' as having leaves streaked with both white and yellow. Wood (1847 and 1851) described 'Viminalis Variegata' as having small leaves and slightly pendulous branches clothed with little shoots, adding that the leaves "occasionally evince a disposition to revert to the green state".

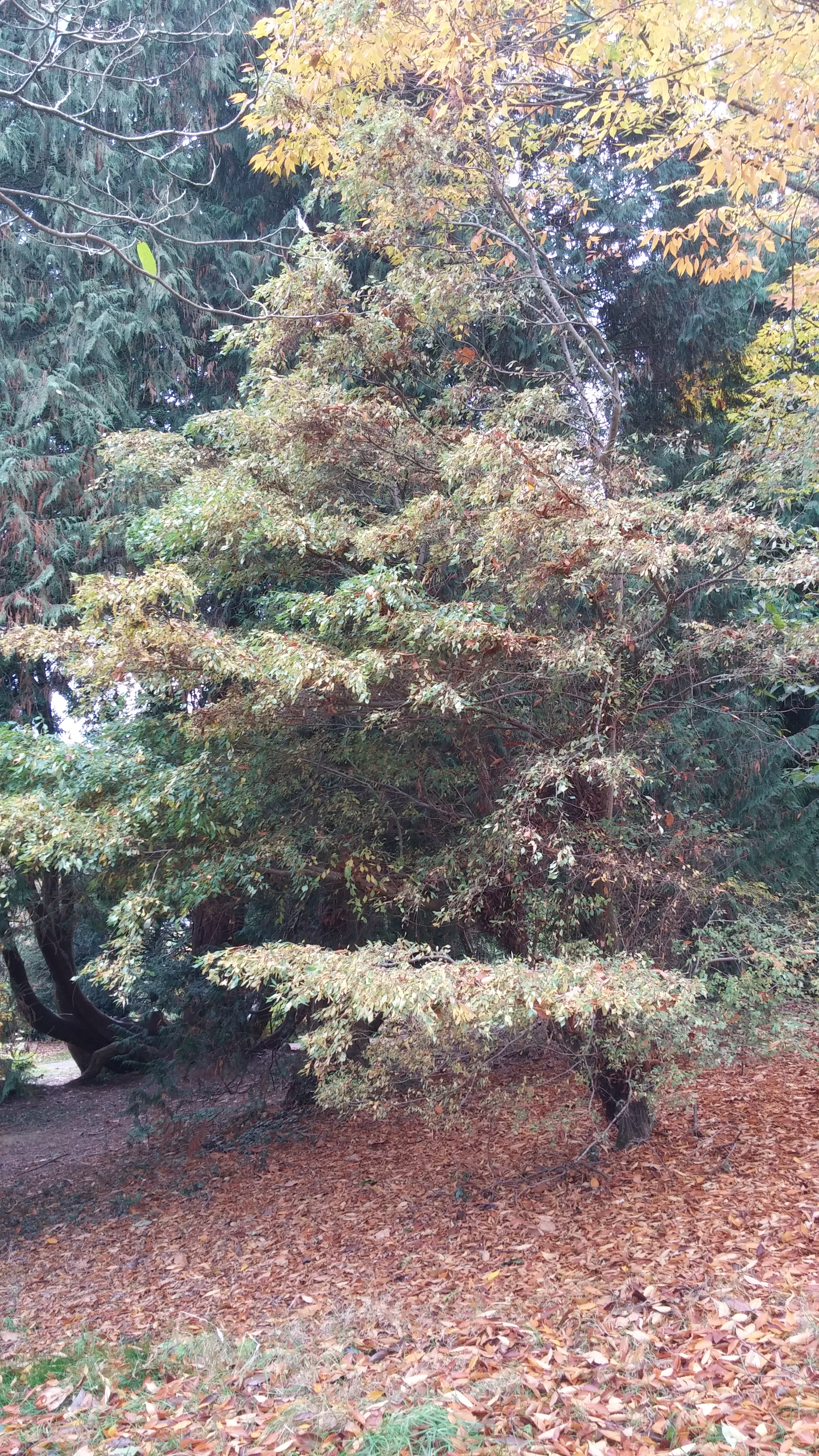
'Pulverulenta' at Batsford Arborerum, November 2016

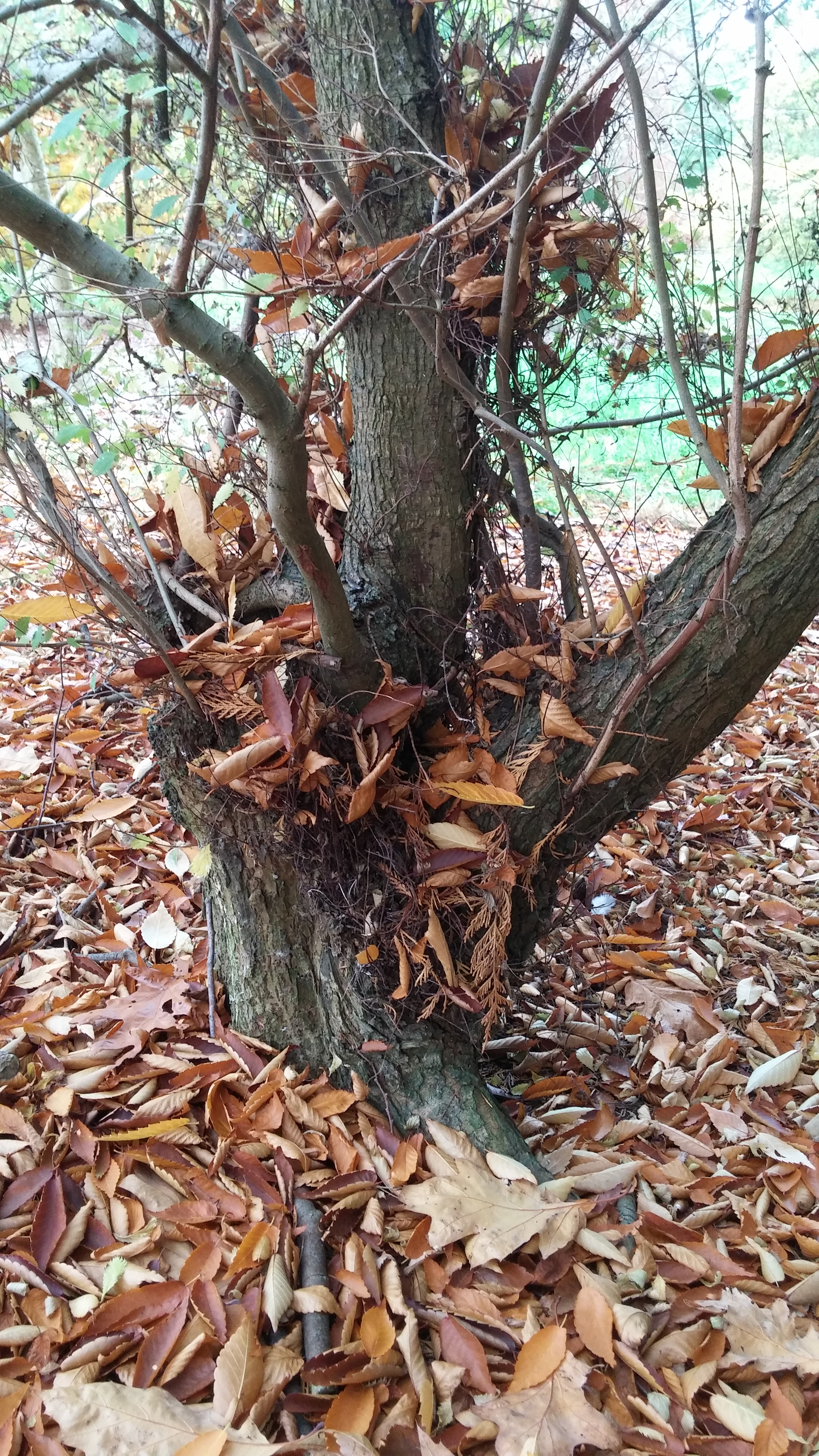
Bole of same

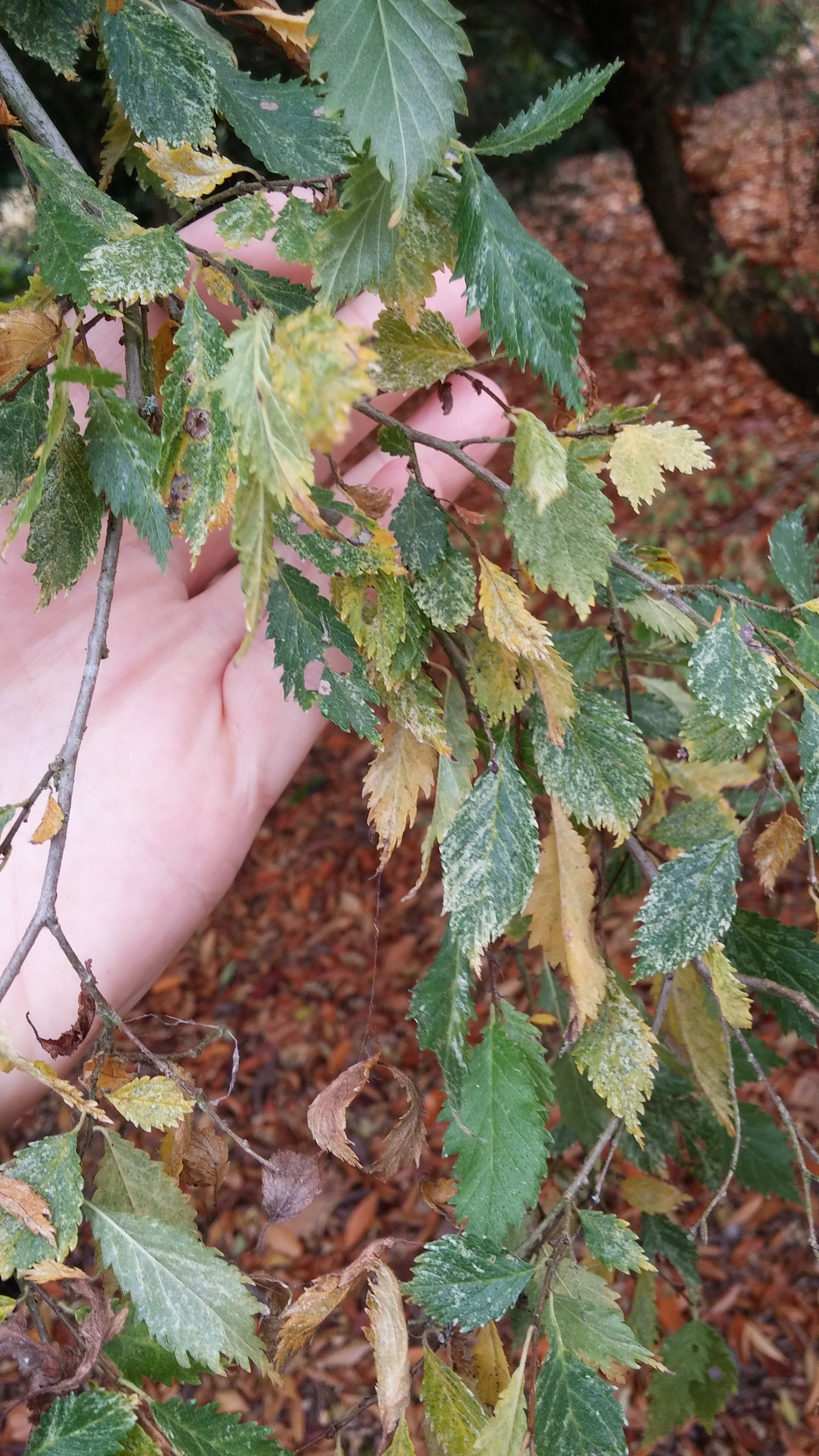
Leaves

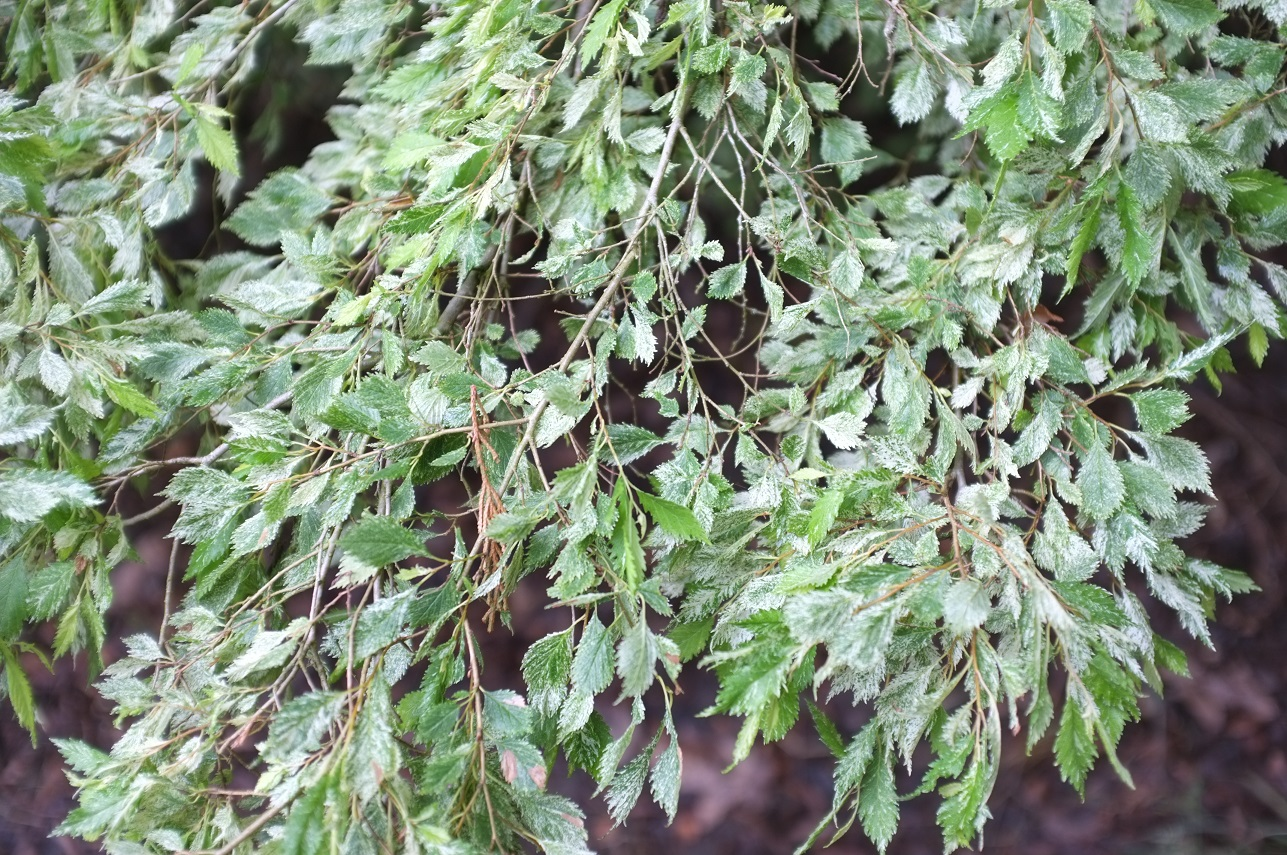
Leaves, June 2014

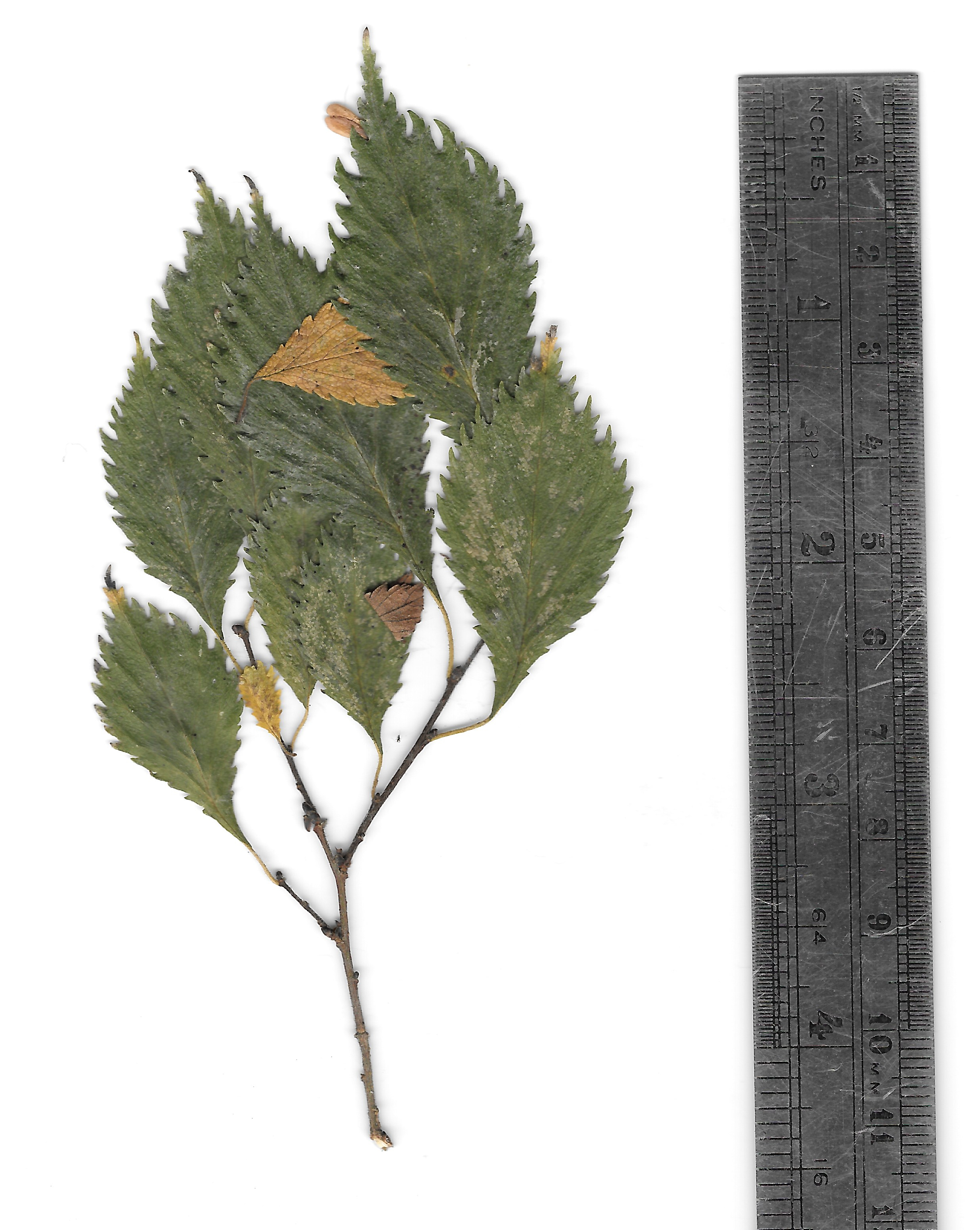
Pressed leaves (variegation lost in drying).

== Pests and diseases ==
'Pulverulenta' is very susceptible to Dutch elm disease.

== Cultivation ==
Wood (1847, 1851) considered 'Viminalis Variegata' "a singularly pretty variegated small tree". As a lawn tree, "When grafted standard high it is one of the prettiest trees imaginable for a single specimen". One, listed as U. campestris viminalis variegata, grew in the Royal Victoria Park, Bath, in the mid-19th century. There was a specimen at Kew Gardens in the early 20th century. Three trees were supplied by the Späth nursery of Berlin to the Royal Botanic Garden Edinburgh in 1902 as U. campestris viminalis marginata, shown by herbarium specimens to have been 'Pulverulenta' or 'Variegata'. They may survive in Edinburgh, as it was the practice of the Garden to distribute trees about the city (viz. the Wentworth Elm); the current list of Living Accessions held in the Garden per se does not list the plant. The Ulmus campestris viminalis marginata supplied by Späth and planted in 1897 at the Dominion Arboretum, Ottawa, Canada, is likely also to have been 'Pulverulenta' or 'Variegata'. Ulmus Viminalis variegata, "a variegated variety of good growth", appeared in early 20th-century catalogues of the Gembrook or Nobelius Nursery near Melbourne.

The tree is now extremely rare in cultivation. A specimen that stood in Highnam Court, Gloucestershire, till at least 1969 was incorrectly labelled 'Viminalis marginata', as is the tree that grows at Batsford Arboretum, Gloucestershire (2023). The Batsford specimen is grafted on a non-suckering stock. Pressed leaves from the Highnam Court tree were sent to the Kew Herbarium in 1969 by Eric W. Pymont (1925–2015), Head of the Horticulture Department at the Gloucestershire College of Agriculture, Hartpury House.

== Accessions ==
- Batsford Arboretum, Moreton-in-Marsh, UK. Listed as U. × viminalis 'Marginata', acc. no. 00/952/G2; SW of the Thatched Cottage.

== Synonymy ==
- Ulmus montana (: glabra) viminalis gracilis aurea Hort..
- Ulmus scabra (: glabra) viminalis fol. punctatis.
