= Ulmus minor 'Microphylla Purpurea' =

Elm cultivar

- Species: Ulmus minor
- Cultivar: 'Microphylla Purpurea'
- Origin: Europe

The Field Elm cultivar Ulmus minor 'Microphylla Purpurea' was first described by C. de Vos, Handboek, 203, 1887.

== Description ==
C. de Vos described the tree as differing only slightly from Ulmus campestris 'Microphylla Rubra'.

== Cultivation ==
No specimens are known to survive.
