= Ulmus × hollandica 'Gaujardii' =

Elm cultivar

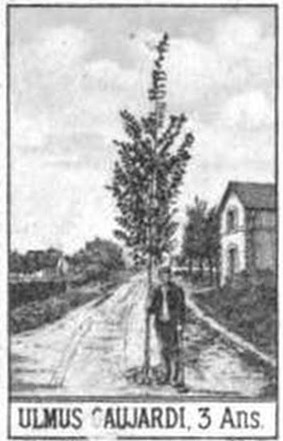
- 'Gaujardii' at 3 years
- Hybrid parentage: U. glabra × U. minor
- Cultivar: 'Gaujardii'
- Origin: France

The hybrid elm cultivar Ulmus × hollandica 'Gaujardii', one of a number of cultivars arising from the crossing of Wych Elm U. glabra with Field Elm U. minor, was raised by the Gaujard-Rome nursery of Châteauroux, France, in the 1890s as Ulmus Gaujardii and was described in the 1898 Kew Bulletin and Wiener illustrirte Garten-Zeitung. It won first prize in the International Horticultural Exhibition in Saint Petersburg, Russia, in 1899 and a silver medal in the Heemstede Exhibition, The Netherlands, in 1925. From the early 20th century it was distributed by the Späth nursery of Berlin as Ulmus montana Gaujardi, and in the interwar years by the Boccard nursery of Geneva as Ulmus campestris Gaujardi. It appeared in Unsere Freiland-Laubgehölze in 1913, but without description.

== Description ==
A tree of symmetrical upright growth and of great vigour, with the appearance of an arrow. The foliage was of medium size, oval and light green. Four photographs of 'Gaujardii' appear in Pépinières Gaujard-Rome et Cie (1930), where the nursery distinguished between medium- and large-leaved forms. Herbarium specimens suggest that more than one clone has been labelled 'Gaujardii'.

== Pests and diseases ==
Elms of the U. × hollandica group are susceptible to Dutch elm disease.

== Cultivation ==
'Gaujardii' was produced at a rate of 30,000 trees per annum by 1930. It was present in The Hague and Utrecht in the 1930s, and there was a specimen at Arnold Arboretum, Massachusetts, in the mid-20th century. No specimens are known to survive.

=== Putative specimen ===
An old U. × hollandica with leaves (unusually for this group) light green all summer and matching the 'Gaujardii' herbarium specimen in The Hague, stands (2019) by 35 Inverleith Terrace, Edinburgh, near the entrance to Royal Botanic Garden. An early 20th century photograph shows it fastigiate when young. Its leaf-shape, samarae, and light suckering confirm its hybridity.

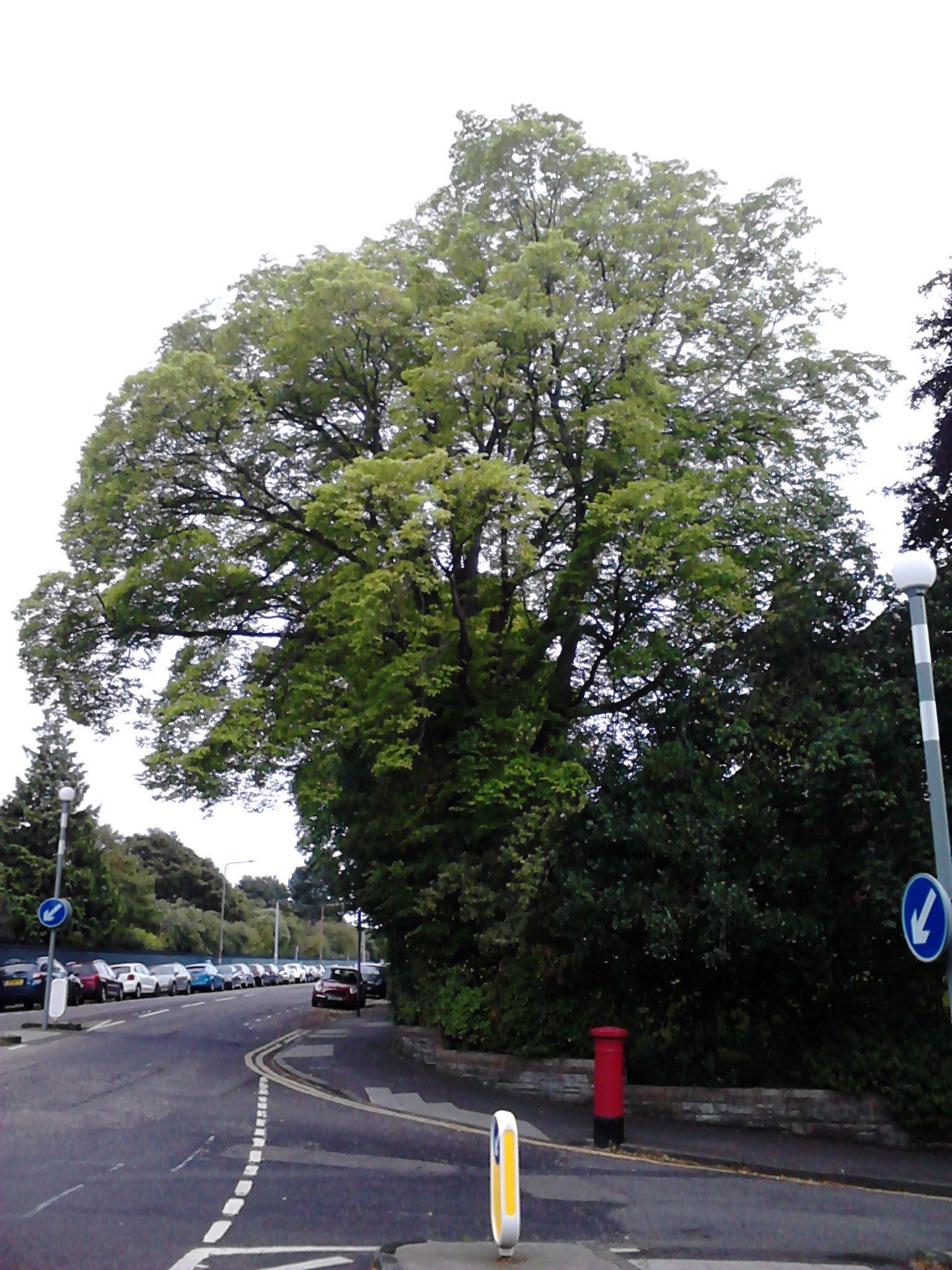
Inverleith Terrace elm, Edinburgh (2016)
