= Ulmus minor 'Erecta' =

Elm cultivar

- Species: Ulmus minor
- Cultivar: 'Erecta'
- Origin: England

The Field Elm cultivar Ulmus minor 'Erecta' was identified by Loudon in Arboretum et Fruticetum Britannicum, 3: 1396, 1838 as Ulmus campestris var erecta.

== Description ==
Loudon described the tree as having "a tall, narrow head, resembling the Cornish Elm, but differing from that tree in having much broader leaves, and a corky bark".

== Cultivation ==
No specimens are known to survive.
