= Ulmus minor 'Reverti' =

Elm cultivar

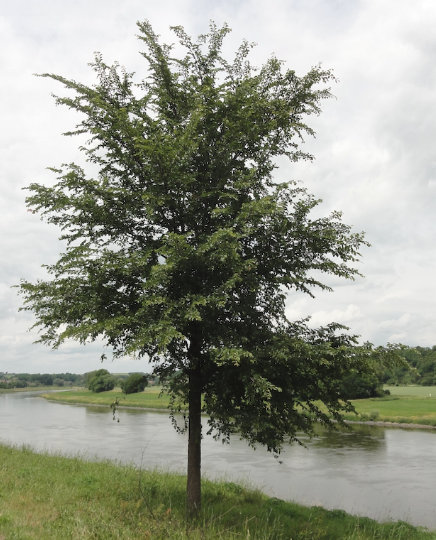
- Ulmus minor 'Reverti'
- Species: Ulmus minor
- Cultivar: 'Reverti'
- Origin: Hungary

The Field Elm cultivar Ulmus minor 'Reverti' is a University of Wisconsin–Madison selection (No. 380-1), registered and named in Germany in 1993 by Conrad Appel, Darmstadt (ceased trading c. 2006).

== Description ==
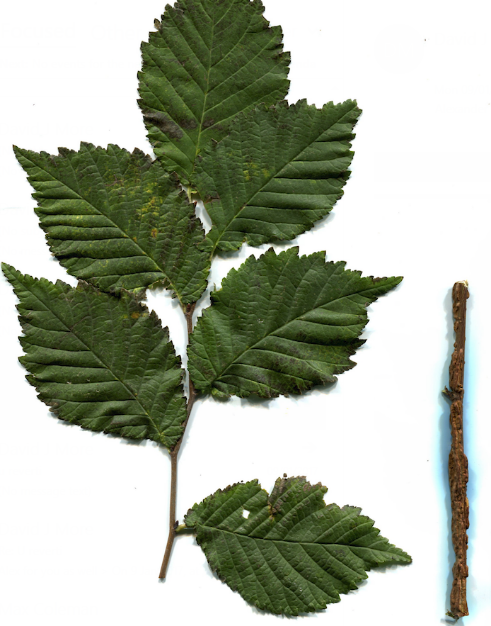
'Reverti' leaves

Not available.

== Cultivation ==
'Reverti' was grown from Hungarian seed and found to the most disease-resistant of the species in the Wisconsin programme. The tree is now in commerce in the Netherlands.

== Accessions ==
=== Europe ===
- Grange Farm Arboretum, Sutton St. James, Spalding, Lincolnshire, UK. Acc. no. 1082.

== Nurseries ==
=== Europe ===
- Noordplant , Glimmen, Netherlands.
