= Ulmus minor 'Purpurea' =

Elm cultivar

- Species: Ulmus minor
- Cultivar: 'Purpurea'
- Origin: Europe

The Purple-leafed Jersey or Guernsey Elm Ulmus minor 'Purpurea' is largely confined to Australia.

== Accessions ==
=== Europe ===
- Grange Farm Arboretum, Lincolnshire, UK. Acc. no. 1268.

== Nurseries ==
=== Australasia ===
- Established Tree Planters Pty. Ltd. , Wandin, Victoria, Australia.
