= Ulmus minor 'Biltii' =

Elm cultivar

- Species: Ulmus minor
- Cultivar: 'Biltii'
- Origin: de Bilt, Netherlands

The Field Elm cultivar Ulmus minor 'Biltii' was selected by Bernard Groenewegen en Zoon (Groenewegen & Son) at his nursery in de Bilt, Netherlands, possibly from French seedlings, and identified in his catalogue of 1921–22 as U. campestris Biltii. Green (1964) confirmed the field elm identification.

== Description ==
'Biltii' has a compact, pyramidal crown, not unlike the Cornish Elm, with crowded, dark green and nearly round leaves. The tips of the younger shoots are tinged purplish-bronze, contrasting with the yellowish-green emergent leaves.

== Cultivation ==
No specimens are known to survive. In 2025 Brighton and Hove City Council listed an elm in Benfield Way, Hove, by this name, without provenance information, though its less rounded leaves have more vein-pairs and longer petioles than the 1955 'Biltii' herbarium specimen from Lombarts Nurseries, Zundert.

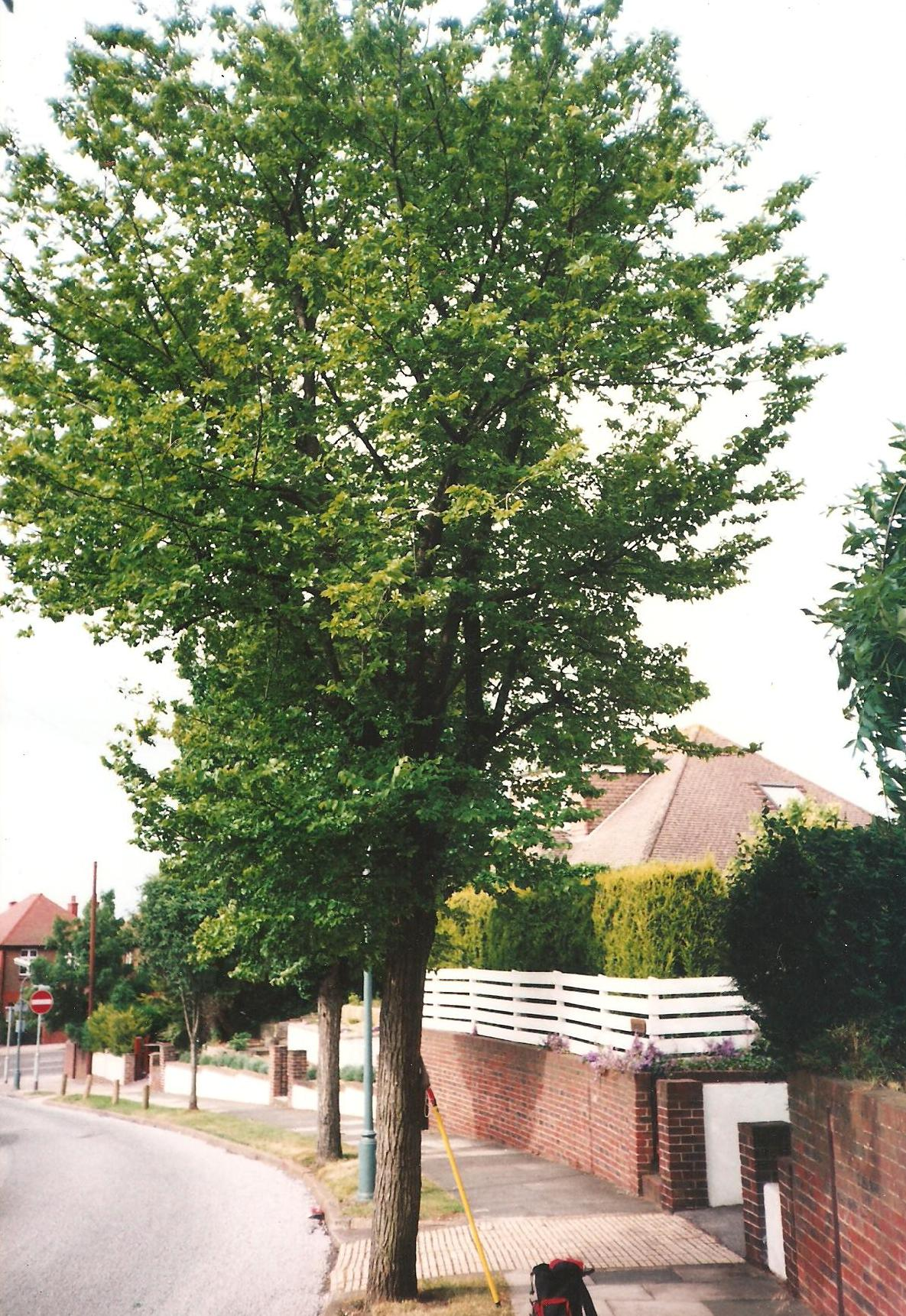
Benfield Way elm

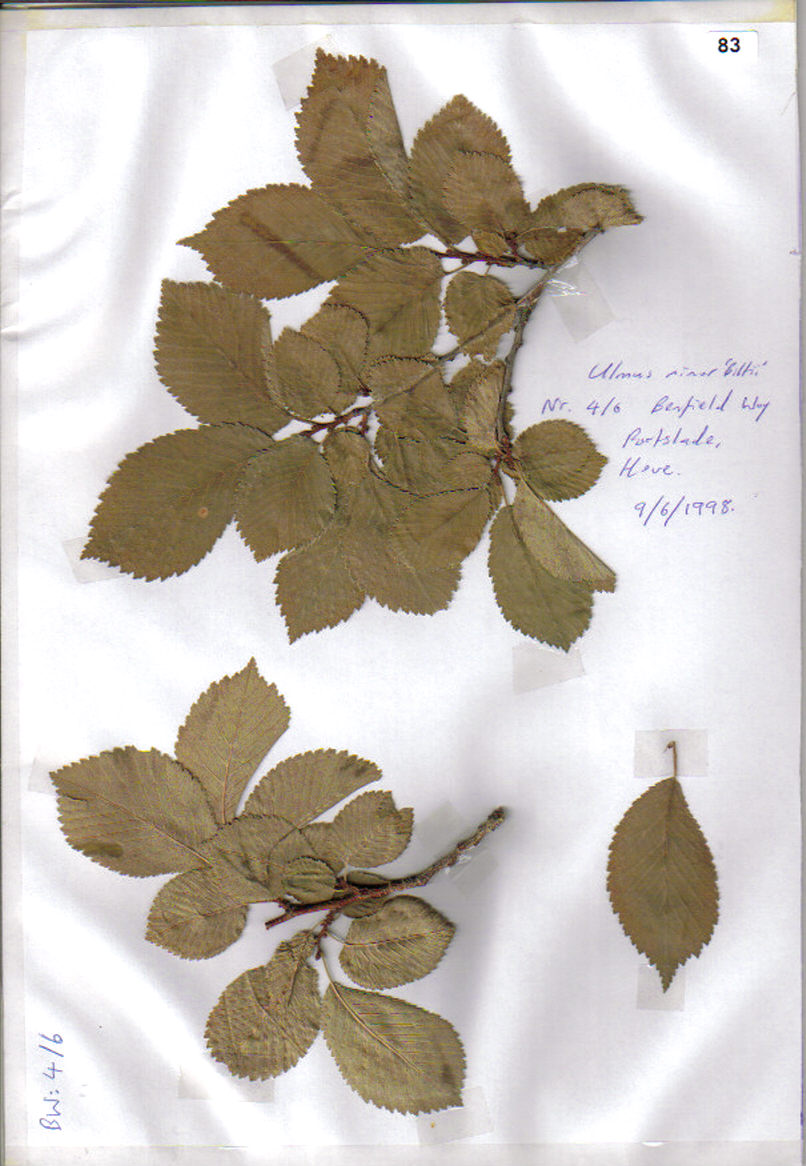
Benfield Way leaves, long shoot

== Synonymy ==
- Ulmus campestris 'Biltil': Pierre Lombarts' Royal Nurseries (Zundert, Netherlands) catalogue of 1959-60, p. 83. Misspelling.
