= Ulmus minor 'Albo-Dentata' =

Elm cultivar

- Species: Ulmus minor
- Cultivar: 'Albo-Dentata'
- Origin: France

The Field Elm cultivar Ulmus minor 'Albo-Dentata' first featured in the Baudriller (Angers, France) nursery catalogue of 1880 as U. microphylla foliis albo-dentata. It was distributed by the Späth nursery of Berlin in the late 19th and early 20th century, as U. campestris microphylla fol. albo-dentatis.

== Description ==
Baudriller described the tree simply as a small-leafed elm with silver teeth. It was later described as a small tree, the leaves with white margins and spots.

== Cultivation ==
One tree, probably obtained from Späth, was planted as U. campestris microphylla fol. albo-dentatis in 1899 at the Dominion Arboretum, Ottawa, Canada. A specimen of U. campestris microphylla fol. albo-dentatis, obtained from Späth and planted in 1914, stood in the Ryston Hall arboretum, Norfolk, in the early 20th century, where it was incorrectly listed as U. campestris macrophylla fol. albo dentatis. No specimens are known to survive, the one known specimen in Latvia now acknowledged as probably another cultivar. The tree is not known to have ever been cultivated beyond Europe.

== Synonymy ==
- Ulmus campestris f. microphylla albo-dentata: Dippel , Hand. Laubh, 2:25, 1892.

== Accessions ==
=== Europe ===
- Hortus Botanicus Nationalis, Salaspils, Latvia. Acc. no. 18143 (acknowledged as possibly U. minor 'Variegata')
