= Ulmus minor 'Retiro' =

Elm cultivar

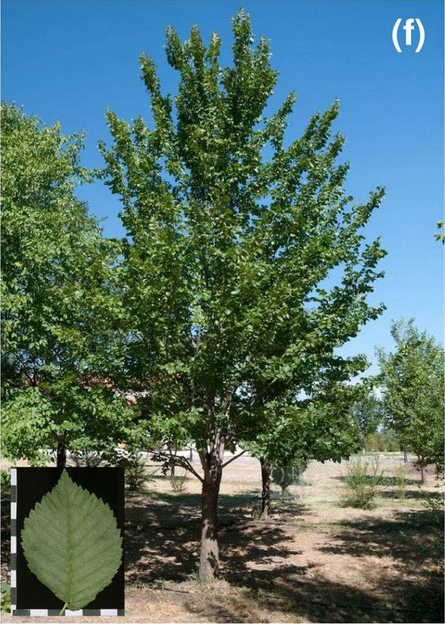
- 'Retiro'
- Species: Ulmus minor
- Cultivar: 'Retiro'
- Origin: Spain

The Field Elm cultivar Ulmus minor 'Retiro' was raised from seed collected in 2002 from a tree growing in the El Retiro park (40°24′56″N 3°41′10″W), in the centre of Madrid by researchers at the Escuela Técnica Superior de Ingenieros de Montes, Universidad Politėcnica de Madrid.

'Retiro' was introduced to the UK in 2015, by Hampshire & Isle of Wight Branch, Butterfly Conservation, as part of an assessment of DED-resistant cultivars as potential hosts of the endangered White-letter Hairstreak.

== Description ==
'Retiro' grew at a comparatively modest rate of 70 cm per annum in the trials at Puerta de Hierro, Madrid. The erect branches, devoid of corky tissue, form a globular crown. The leaves, on 7 mm petioles, are elliptic, typically acuminate at the apex, the average length and width 71 × 42 mm, the margins doubly serrate. Foliar density relative to 'Sapporo Autumn Gold' is described as 'high'. In the Madrid study, the appearance of the tree was rated 4 / 5. The tree began leafing in mid April (week 15) in southern England, where it also began suckering from roots, the first of the Madrid U. minor clones to do so, at age 7; flowering began at age 9.

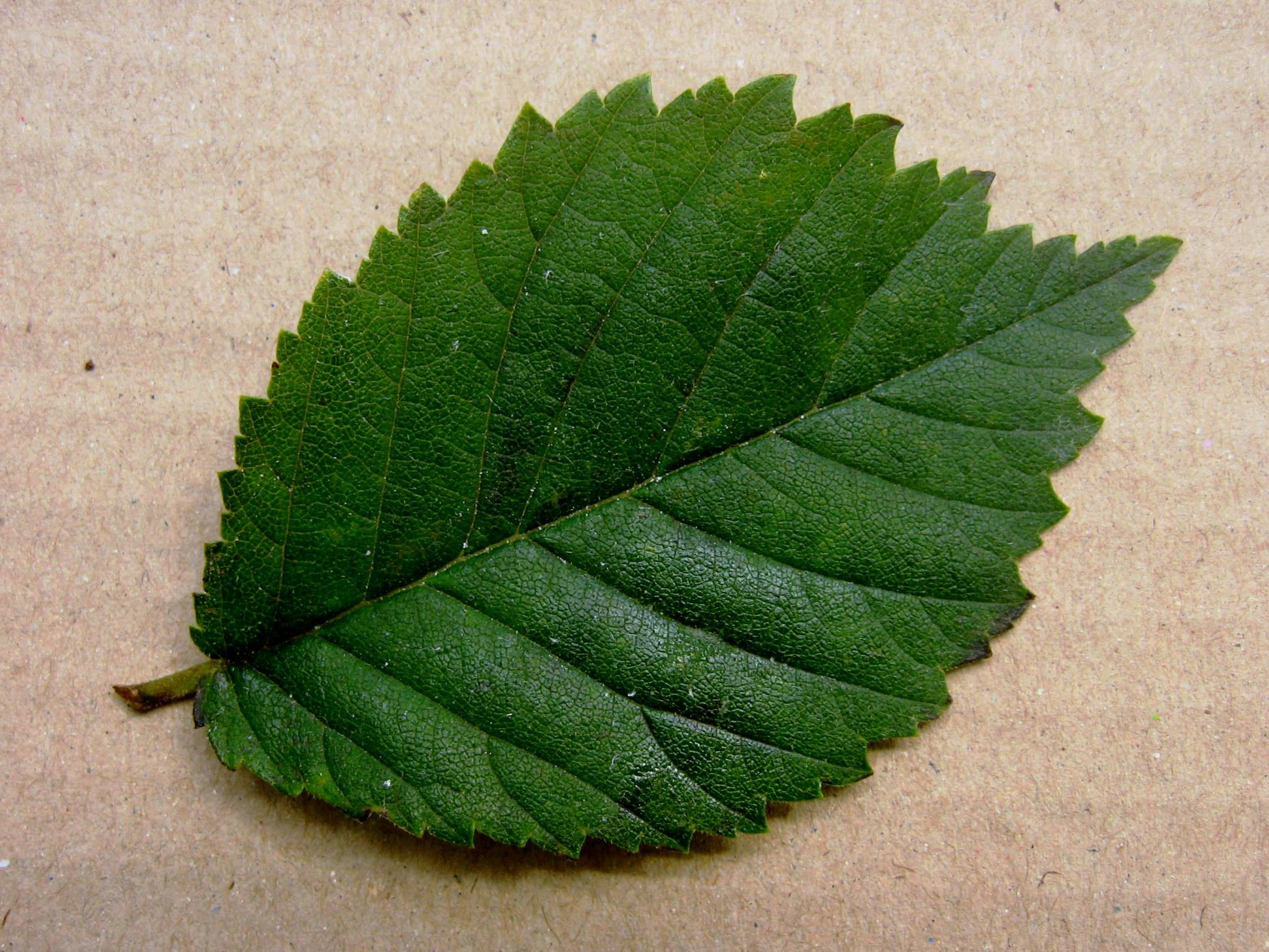
'Retiro' leaf

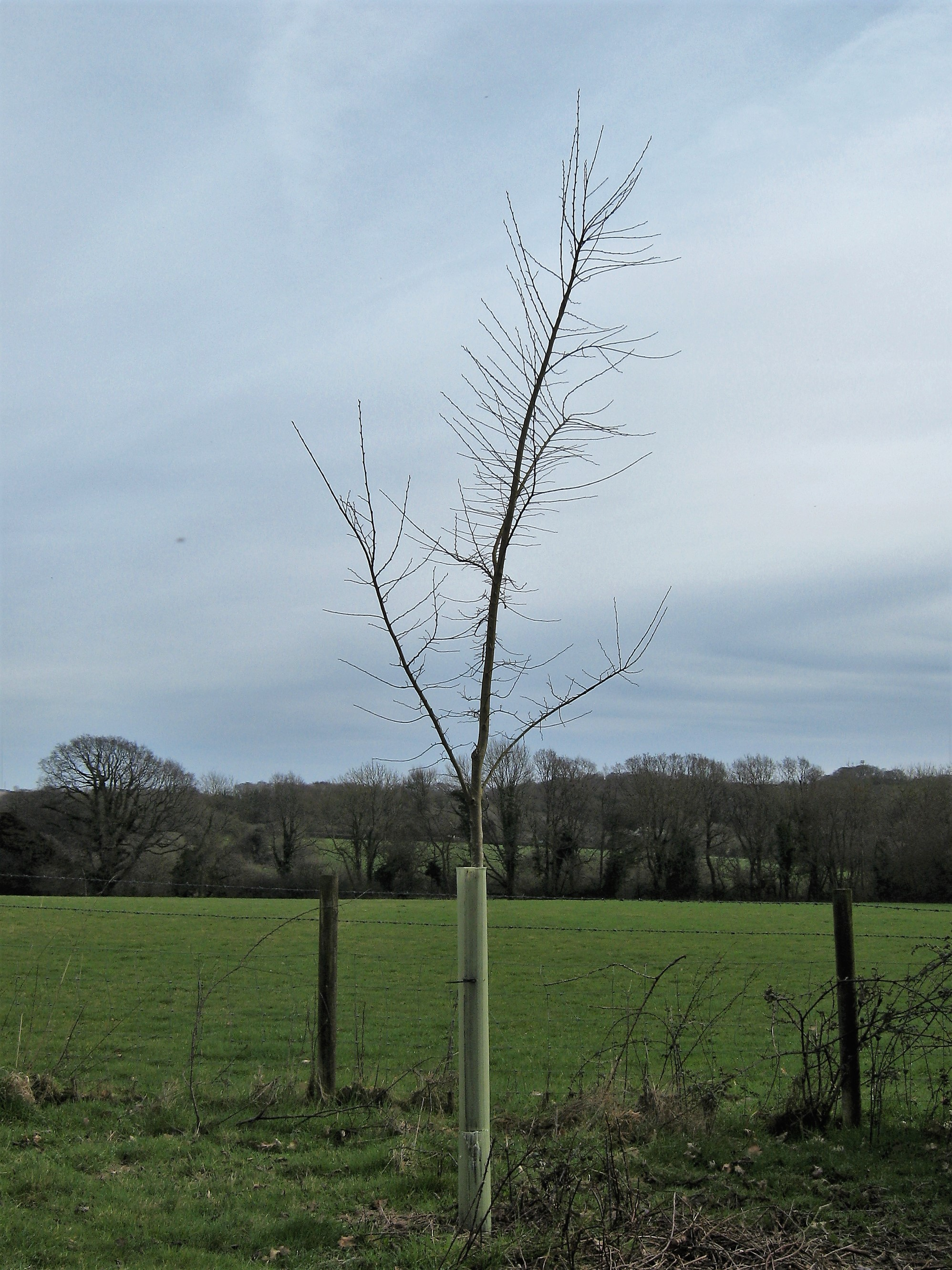
'Retiro' sapling, with typical arching stem

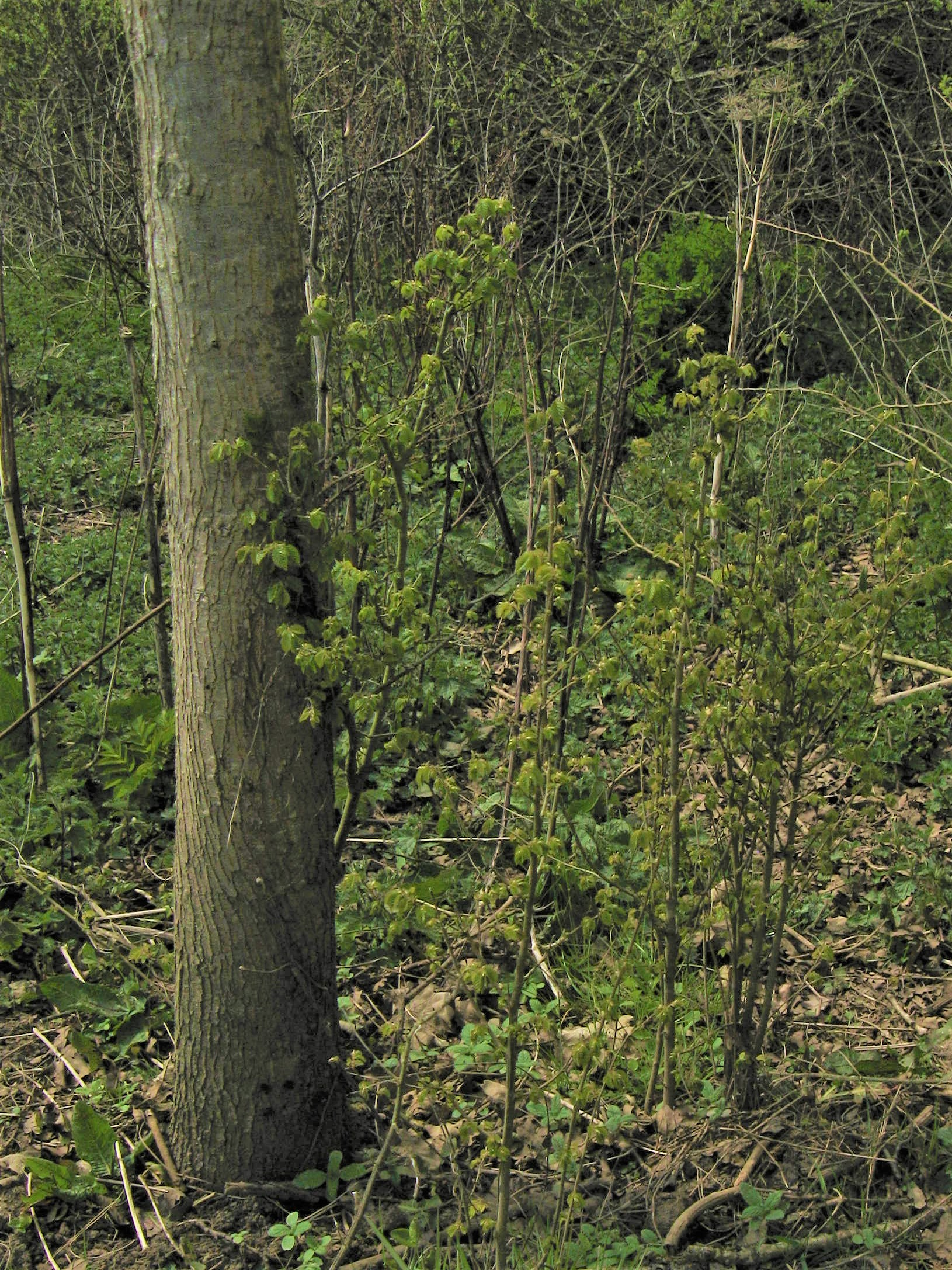
'Retiro' root suckering, Boarhunt, UK, age 7

== Pests and diseases ==
Tested by inoculation with the pathogen by Universidad Politecnica de Madrid, 'Retiro' was one of a number indicating a high resistance to DED, on a par with, if not greater than, the hybrid cultivar 'Sapporo Autumn Gold'. However, the tree's performance in the field in trials in England found a high degree of susceptibility, and several have succumbed to DED.

== Cultivation ==
The cultivar is (2018) undergoing further trials in a different environment in Spain. One specimen survives (2025) in England along the River Wallington at Priors Hold Farm, Boarhunt, Hampshire .
