= Ulmus minor 'Lanuginosa' =

Elm cultivar

- Species: Ulmus minor
- Cultivar: 'Lanuginosa'
- Origin: Europe

The Field Elm cultivar Ulmus minor 'Lanuginosa' was mentioned (as Ulmus suberosa var. lanuginosa) by Lavallée in Arboretum Segrezianum 236. 1877, but without description.

== Description ==
Not available.

== Cultivation ==
No specimens are known to survive.
