= Ulmus davidiana var. japonica × U. minor =

Variety of elm

- Hybrid parentage: Ulmus davidiana var. japonica × U. minor
- Origin: US

The hybrid elm Ulmus davidiana var. japonica × U. minor was raised at the Arnold Arboretum before 1924.

== Description ==
The old specimen in the Morton Arboretum, Illinois (2014), is an open-branched tree, more broad than tall, with ascending branches, the bark breaking into shallow vertical plates.

== Cultivation ==
One specimen survives at the Morton Arboretum. The hybrid was cultivated at the Baarn elm research institute, The Netherlands, in the mid-20th century. It is not known to have been introduced to Australasia.

== Accessions ==
North America

- Morton Arboretum, Illinois, US. Acc. no. 2351–24. Raised from seed of the tree at the Arnold Arboretum.
