= Ulmus minor 'Silvery Gem' =

Elm cultivar

- Species: Ulmus minor
- Cultivar: 'Silvery Gem'
- Origin: Europe

The field elm cultivar Ulmus minor 'Silvery Gem' is an ornamental clone raised, as Ulmus carpinifolia 'Silvery Gem', before 1965 by P. G. Zwijnenburg of Zwijnenburg nurseries, Boskoop, The Netherlands.

== Description ==
A moderately tall growing shrub, reaching about 3–4 m (9.8–13.1 ft) in 10 years and with rather dense, twiggy branches bearing ovate leaves of a grey-green or silvery colour, especially in the spring, with irregular but conspicuous creamy-white margins. The colouring and variegation are most striking in spring, fading somewhat in summer.

== Pests and diseases ==
'Silvery Gem' is not known to be resistant to Dutch elm disease, but the low height of the tree may ensure that it avoids colonization by Scolytus bark beetles and thus remain free of infection. It has been noted that shrub-elms are usually less prone to infection.

== Cultivation ==
The clone won a Golden Medal in The Netherlands in the mid-1960s. It remains available from several nurseries in Europe (see below).

== Synonymy ==
- Ulmus procera 'Silvery Gem'.

== Nurseries ==
=== Europe ===
- Arboretum Waasland, Nieuwkerken-Waas, Belgium.
- Clonmel Garden Centre, Clonmel, County Tipperary, Ireland.
- PlantenTuin Esveld, Boskoop, Netherlands. .
- Wisley Plant Centre (Royal Horticultural Society), Woking, UK.
