= Ulmus minor 'Laciniata' =

Elm cultivar

- Species: Ulmus minor
- Cultivar: 'Laciniata'
- Origin: Europe

The Field Elm cultivar Ulmus minor 'Laciniata' was listed by Wesmael in Bulletin de la Fédération des sociétés d'horticulture de Belgique 1862: 390 1863 as Ulmus campestris var. nuda subvar. microphylla laciniata Hort. Vilv..

== Description ==
The tree was described as having laciniate leaves 3–5 cm long.

== Cultivation ==
No specimens are known to survive; a specimen at the Ryston Hall, Norfolk, arboretum, obtained from the Léon Chenault nursery in Orléans before 1914, was killed by the earlier strain of Dutch elm disease prevalent in the 1930s.
