= Ulmus minor 'Cretensis' =

Elm cultivar

- Species: Ulmus minor
- Cultivar: 'Cretensis'
- Origin: Crete

The Field Elm cultivar Ulmus minor 'Cretensis' [:from Crete] was first mentioned by Nicholson in Kew Hand-List Trees & Shrubs Vol.2 (1896), as Ulmus campestris var. cretensis, without description. A 1908 herbarium specimen at Kew Gardens with an accompanying description suggests that 'Cretensis' is not synonymous with Ulmus minor var. canescens, also present on Crete.

== Description ==
On the Kew Herbarium specimen Augustin Ley added the description: "All parts [of the shoots and upper leaf-surface] very glabrous and smooth; [on the leaf underside] axils and leaf-surface along mid-rib hairy; non glandular". The specimen shows obovate leaves, 4 to 6 cm long by 3 to 5 wide, with a small tapering tip, biserrate or triserrate margin, and a 5 mm petiole.

== Pests and diseases ==
See under Ulmus minor.

== Cultivation ==
It is not known whether 'Cretensis' remains in cultivation. An old field elm by the 11th-century Byzantine church of St Nicholas, Kyriakosellia, Apokoronas, western Crete, is in the locality where 'Cretensis' herbarium specimens were collected in the early 20th century, and outside the small area in central Crete where 'Canescens' has been found. Sfikas (2011), however, refers to 'Canescens' in the Apokoronas area.
