= Ulmus minor 'Folia Alba-Punctata' =

Elm cultivar

- Species: Ulmus minor
- Cultivar: 'Folia Alba-Punctata'
- Origin: Netherlands?

The Field Elm cultivar Ulmus minor 'Folia Alba-Punctata' was first identified by C. de Vos in 1867, as Ulmus campestris fol. albo punctatis. The tree is assumed to be U. minor by Green.

== Description ==
C. de Vos described the tree as having leaves dotted, not flecked, with white.

== Cultivation ==
No specimens are known to survive. An 'Album Punctatum', with "white-speckled foliage", appeared in the 1902 catalogue of the Bobbink and Atkins nursery, Rutherford, New Jersey, though this may have been the 'Punctata' more common in cultivation at that time.
