= Ulmus minor 'Amplifolia' =

Elm cultivar

- Species: Ulmus minor
- Cultivar: 'Amplifolia'
- Origin: Germany

The Field Elm cultivar Ulmus minor 'Amplifolia' was first described (as U. foliacaea var. amplifolia) in 1932, and sourced from Hesse's Nurseries, Weener, Germany as U. alba Waldst. et Kit.

== Description ==
The tree was said to have very short internodes with crowded leaves.

== Cultivation ==
No specimens are known to survive.
