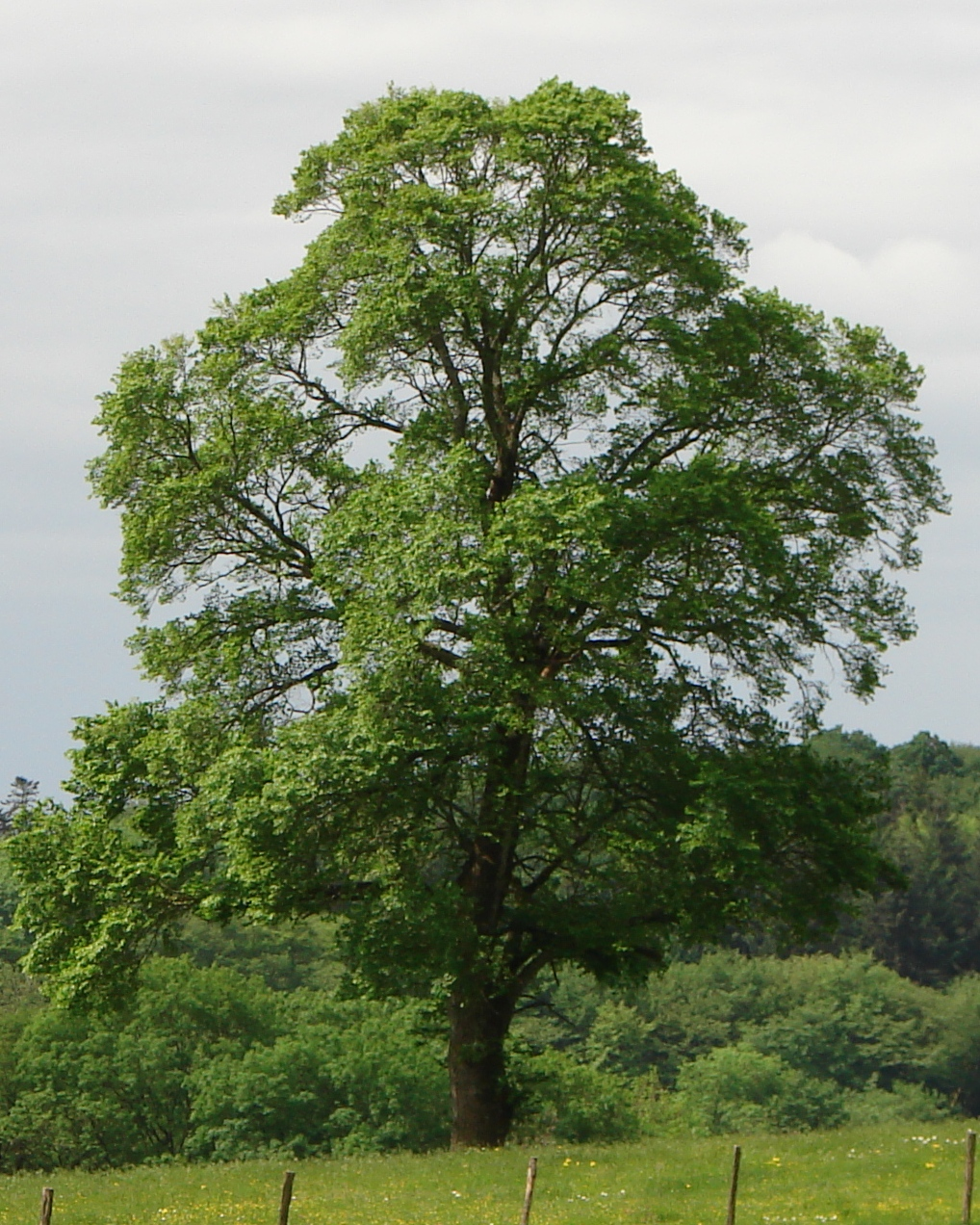
- Field elm, Blismes, Nièvre, France.

Conservation status
- Data Deficient (IUCN 3.1)

Scientific classification
- Kingdom: Plantae
- Clade: Tracheophytes
- Clade: Angiosperms
- Clade: Eudicots
- Clade: Rosids
- Order: Rosales
- Family: Ulmaceae
- Genus: Ulmus
- Species: U. minor

Binomial name
- Ulmus minor Mill.
- Distribution map

Synonyms
- Ulmus araxina Takht.; Ulmus boissieri Grudz.; Ulmus campestre Anon.; Ulmus campestris L. var. australis Henry; Ulmus campestris L. var. dalmatica Baldacci; Ulmus campestris var. glabra Hartig, Planch., Aschers. & Graebn.; Ulmus campestris var. laevis Spach, Planch.; Ulmus campestris Huds. var. microphylla Boiss.; Ulmus canescens Melville; Ulmus carpinifolia Gled.; Ulmus coritana Melville; Ulmus densa Litv.; Ulmus foliacea Gilibert, Sarg.; Ulmus georgica Schchian; Ulmus glabra Mill. var.pilifera Borbas; Ulmus grossheimii Takht.; Ulmus micrantha Kitt.; Ulmus microphylla Mill.; Ulmus microphylla Pers.; Ulmus minor subsp. minor Richens; Ulmus minor suberosa Moench, Rehder; Ulmus nemoralis Fraas; Ulmus nitens Moench; Ulmus pilifera Borbas; Ulmus procera Salisb.; Ulmus sparsa Dumrt.; Ulmus stricta (Aiton) Lindley; Ulmus stricta (Aiton) Lindley var goodyeri Melville; Ulmus tetrandra Sckk.; Ulmus tortuosa Host; Ulmus uzbekistanica Drob.; Ulmus wissotzkyi Kotov

= Ulmus minor =

Species of plant

Ulmus minor Mill., the field elm, is by far the most polymorphic of the European species, although its taxonomy remains a matter of contention. Its natural range is predominantly south European, extending to Asia Minor and Iran; its northern outposts are the Baltic islands of Öland and Gotland, although it may have been introduced by humans. The tree's typical habitat is low-lying forest along the main rivers, growing in association with oak and ash, where it tolerates summer floods as well as droughts.

Current treatment of the species owes much to Richens, who noted (1983) that several varieties of field elm are distinguishable on the European mainland. Of these, he listed the small-leaved U. minor of France and Spain; the narrow-leaved U. minor of northern and central Italy; the densely hairy leaved U. minor of southern Italy and Greece; the U. minor with small-toothed leaves from the Balkans; the U. minor with large-toothed leaves from the Danube region; and the small-leaved U. minor from southern Russia and Ukraine. As for British varieties, "the continental populations most closely related [to eastern English Field Elm] are in central Europe", while south-western forms were introduced from France. He concluded, however, that owing to incomplete field-research at the time of writing, it was "not possible to present an overall breakdown of the European Field Elm into regional varieties". The epithet 'red' elm was commonly used by British foresters, an allusion to the colour of the timber.

Richens sank a number of British elms, notably English elm, as either subspecies or varieties of U. minor in 1968. However, Melville, writing ten years later, identified five distinct species (including U. glabra in the count), several varieties and numerous complex hybrids. In 1992 Armstrong identified no fewer than forty British species and microspecies. Clive Stace (1997) wrote of the British elms "The two-species (glabra and minor) concept of Richens is not sufficiently discriminating to be of taxonomic value". Nevertheless, it is Richens' classification which has been the most commonly adopted in recent years, although it is not used in Flora Europaea.

In 2009 Dr Max Coleman of the Royal Botanic Garden, Edinburgh wrote: "The advent of DNA fingerprinting has shed considerable light on the question. A number of studies have now shown that the distinctive forms Melville elevated to species and Richens lumped together as field elm are single clones, all genetically identical, which have been propagated by vegetative means such as cuttings or root suckers. This means that enigmatic British elms such as Plot elm and English elm have been shown to be single clones of field elm. Although Richens did not have the evidence to prove it, he was correct in recognising a series of clones and grouping them together as a variable species."

It is hoped that analysis of molecular markers will ultimately eliminate the taxonomic confusion.

== Description ==
The tree typically grows to < 30 m (98 ft) and bears a rounded crown. The bark of the trunk is rough, furrowed lightly in older trees to form a block pattern. Young branchlets occasionally have corky wings. The shoots are slender compared with those of wych elm. The leaves are smaller than those of the other European species, hence the specific epithet minor, however they can vary greatly according to the maturity of the tree. Leaves on juvenile growth (suckers, seedlings etc.) are coarse and pubescent, whereas those on mature growth are generally smooth, though remaining highly variable in form; there are generally fewer than 12 pairs of side veins. A common characteristic is the presence of minute black glands along the leaf veins, detectable with the aid of a magnifying glass. The samarae are oval or obovate, glabrous, 12–15 mm (15/32–19/32 in) long, notched at the top, with the seed close to the notch. Ulmus minor in France generally begins to flower and fruit when aged 10 years.

The species readily produces suckers from roots and stumps, even after devastation by Dutch elm disease; consequently genetic resources are not considered endangered.

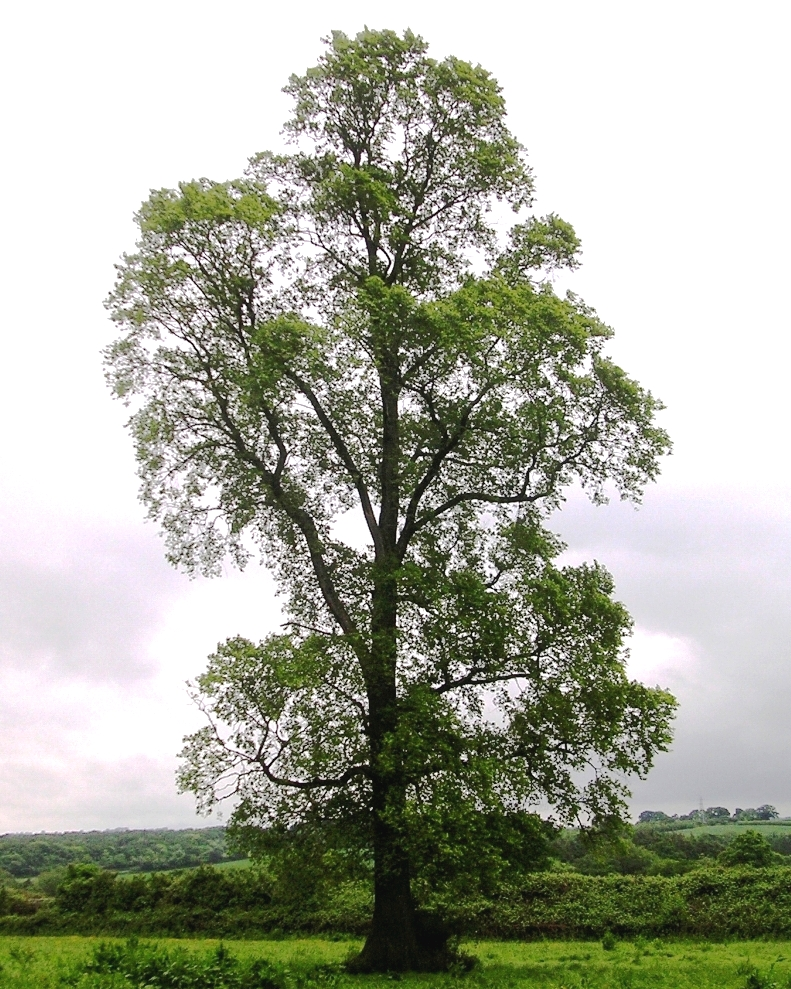
Typical U. minor form, East Coker, UK (2008)

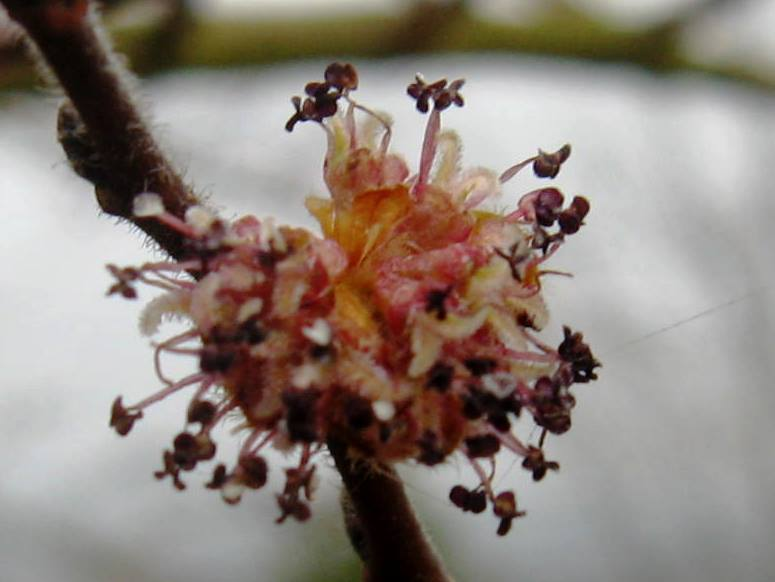
U. minor inflorescence

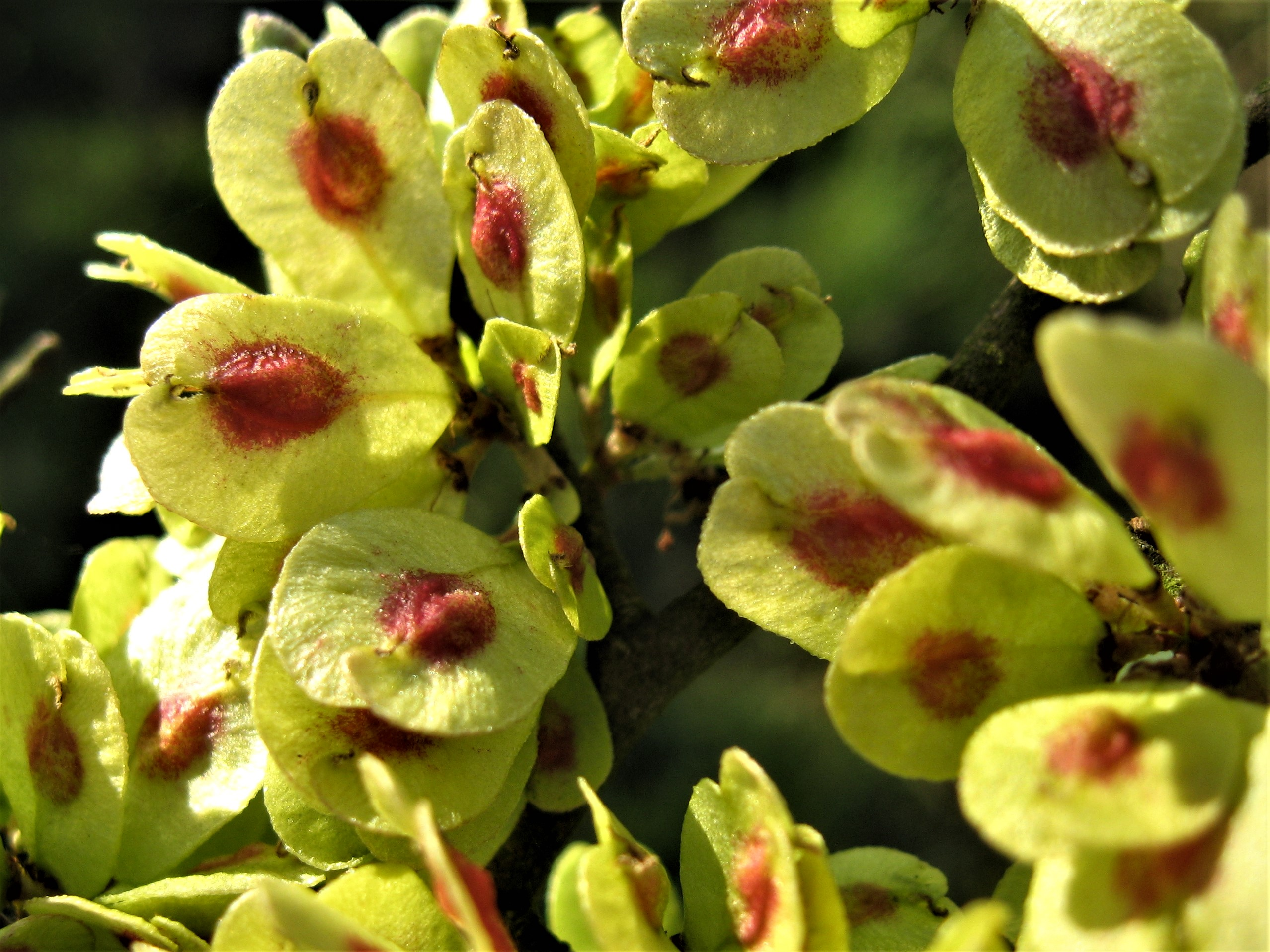
U. minor samarae

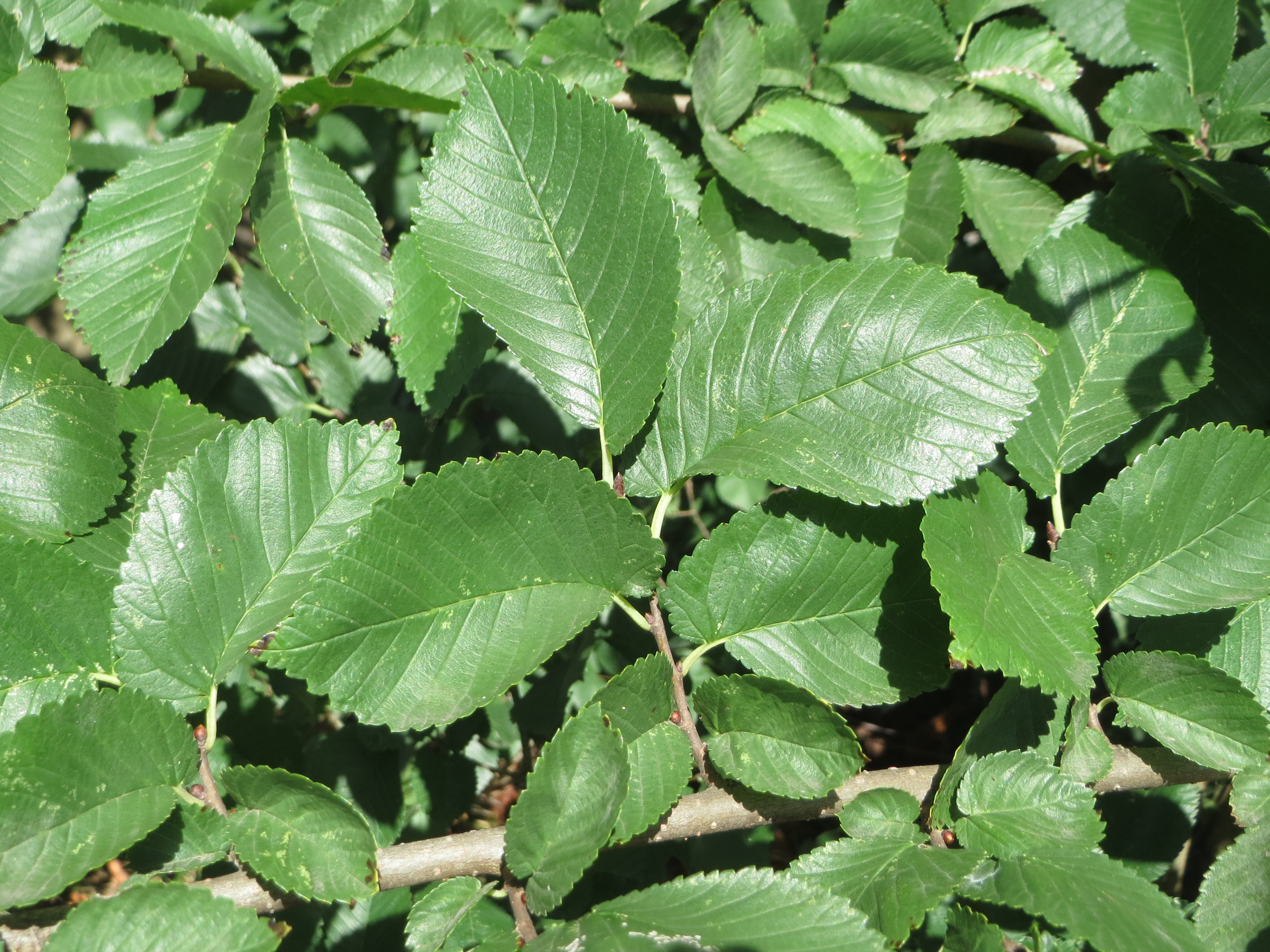
U. minor foliage

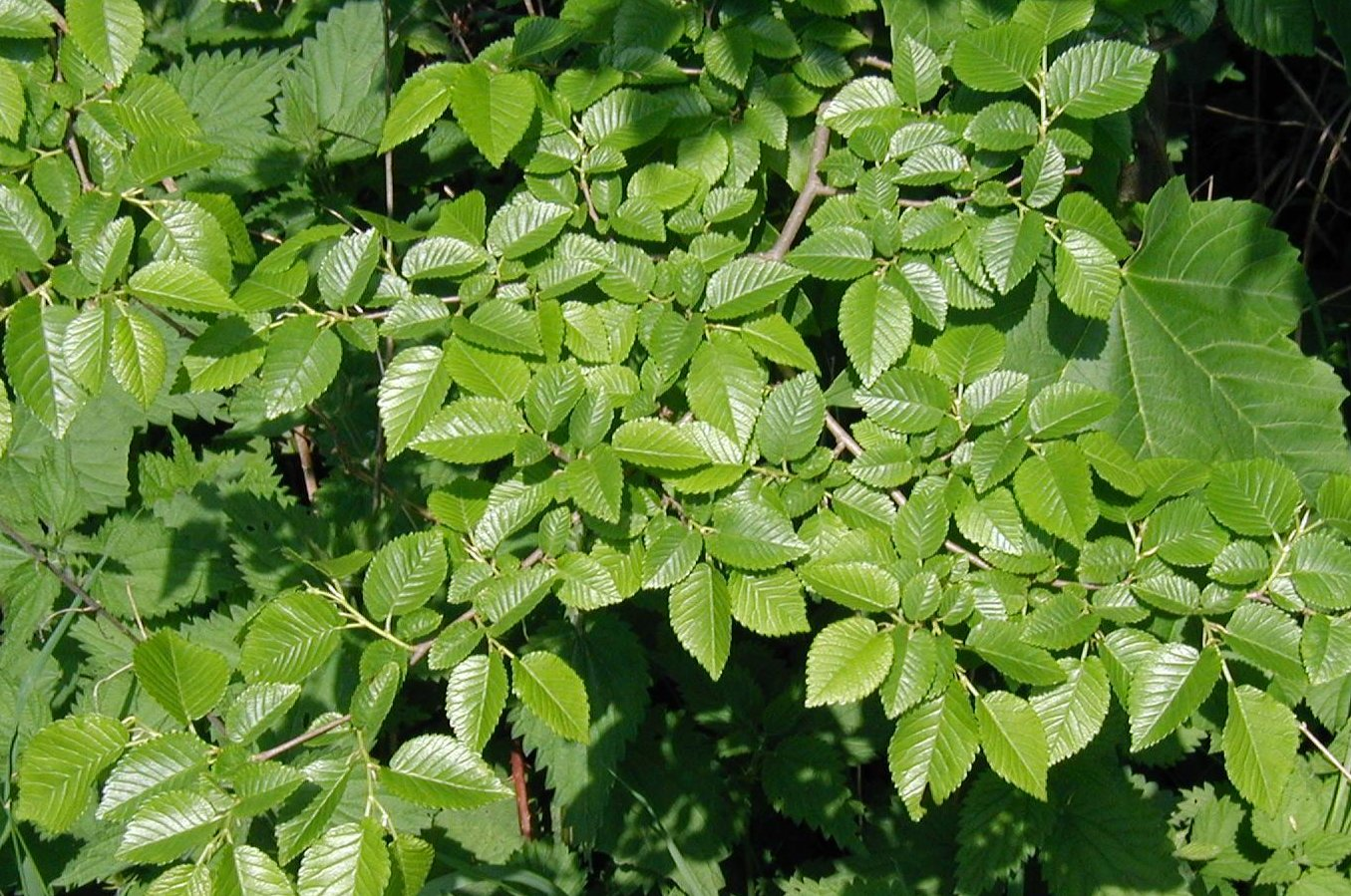
U. minor foliage

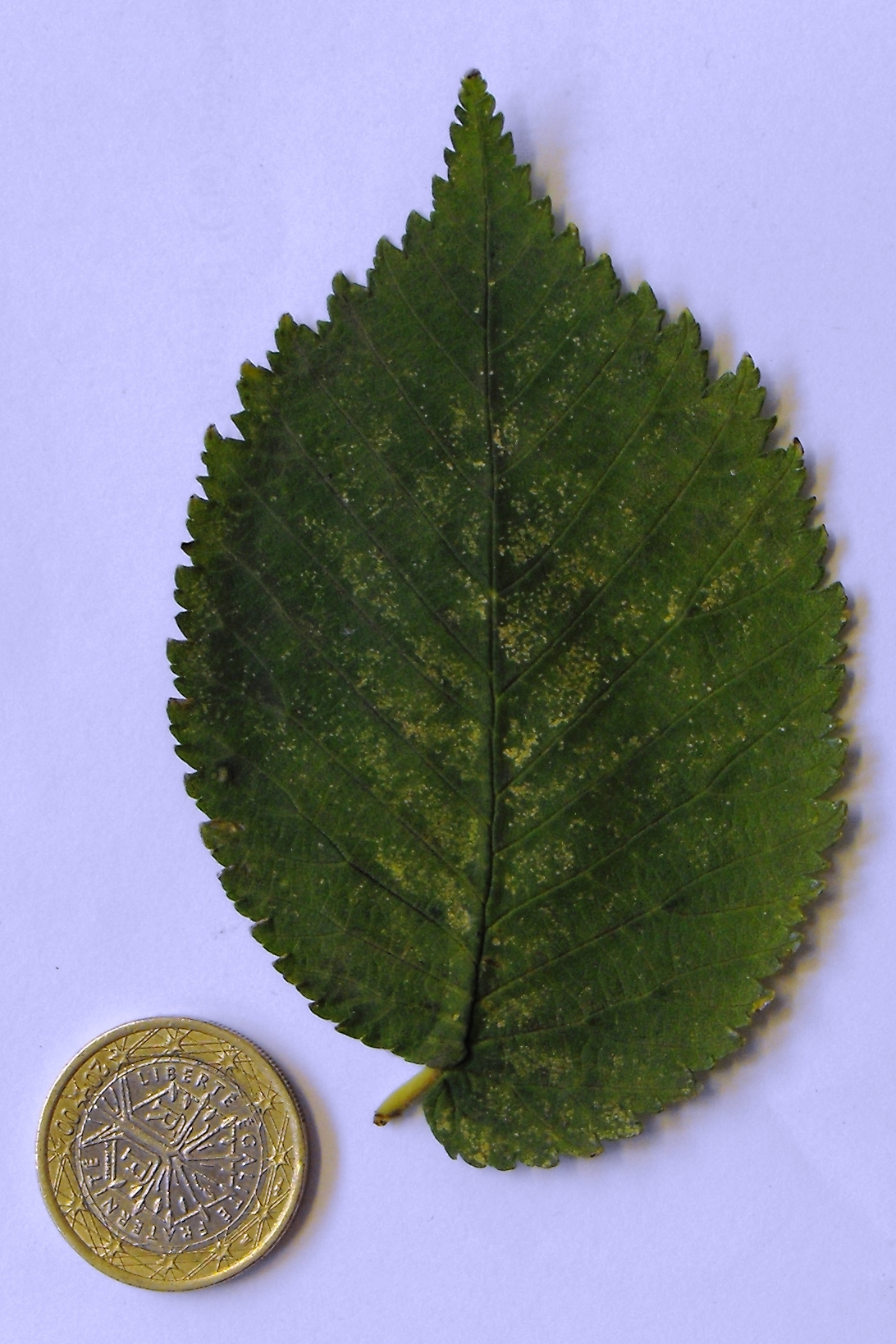
Leaf and 1 Euro coin

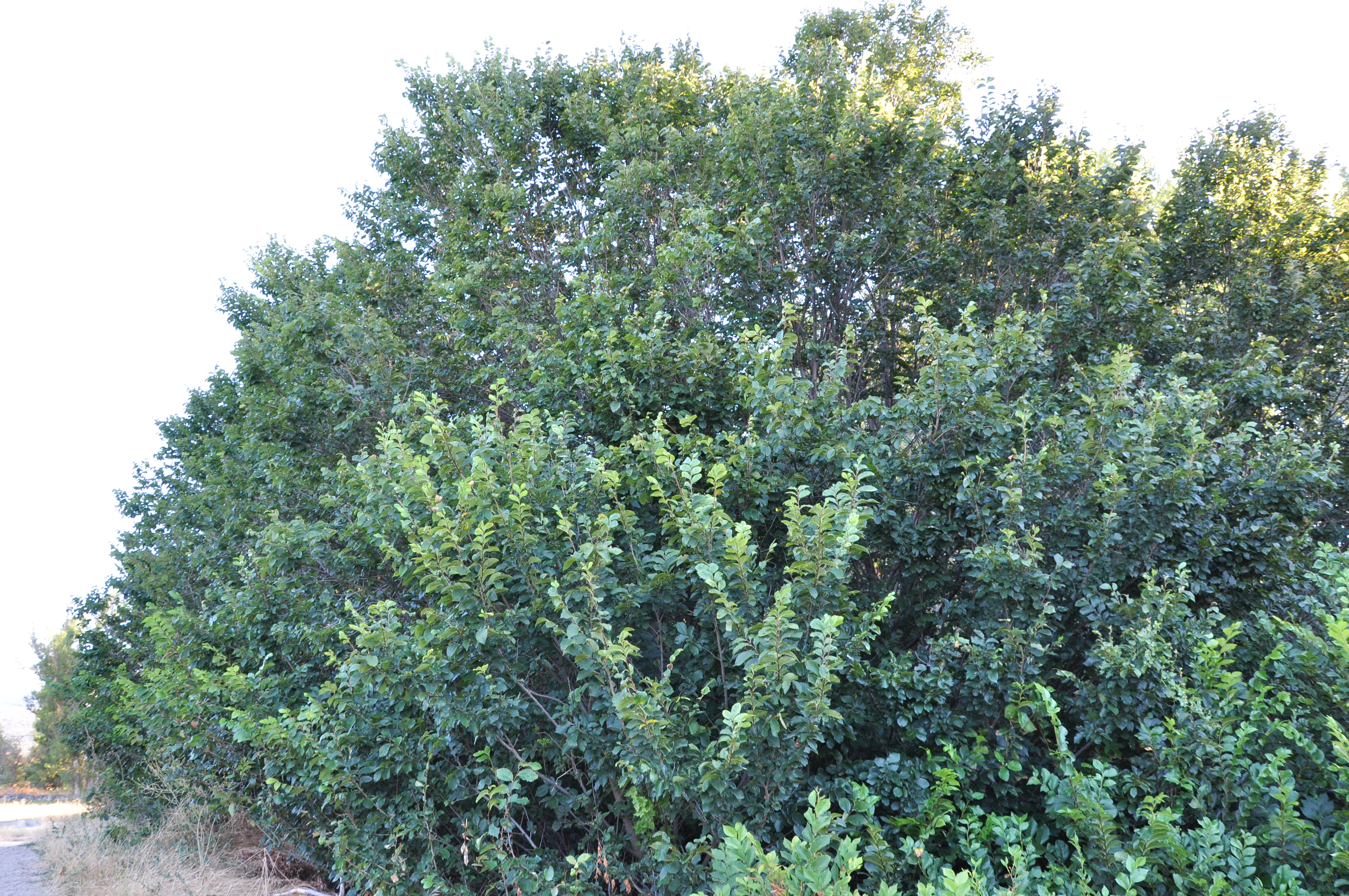
Root-suckers spreading around a field elm

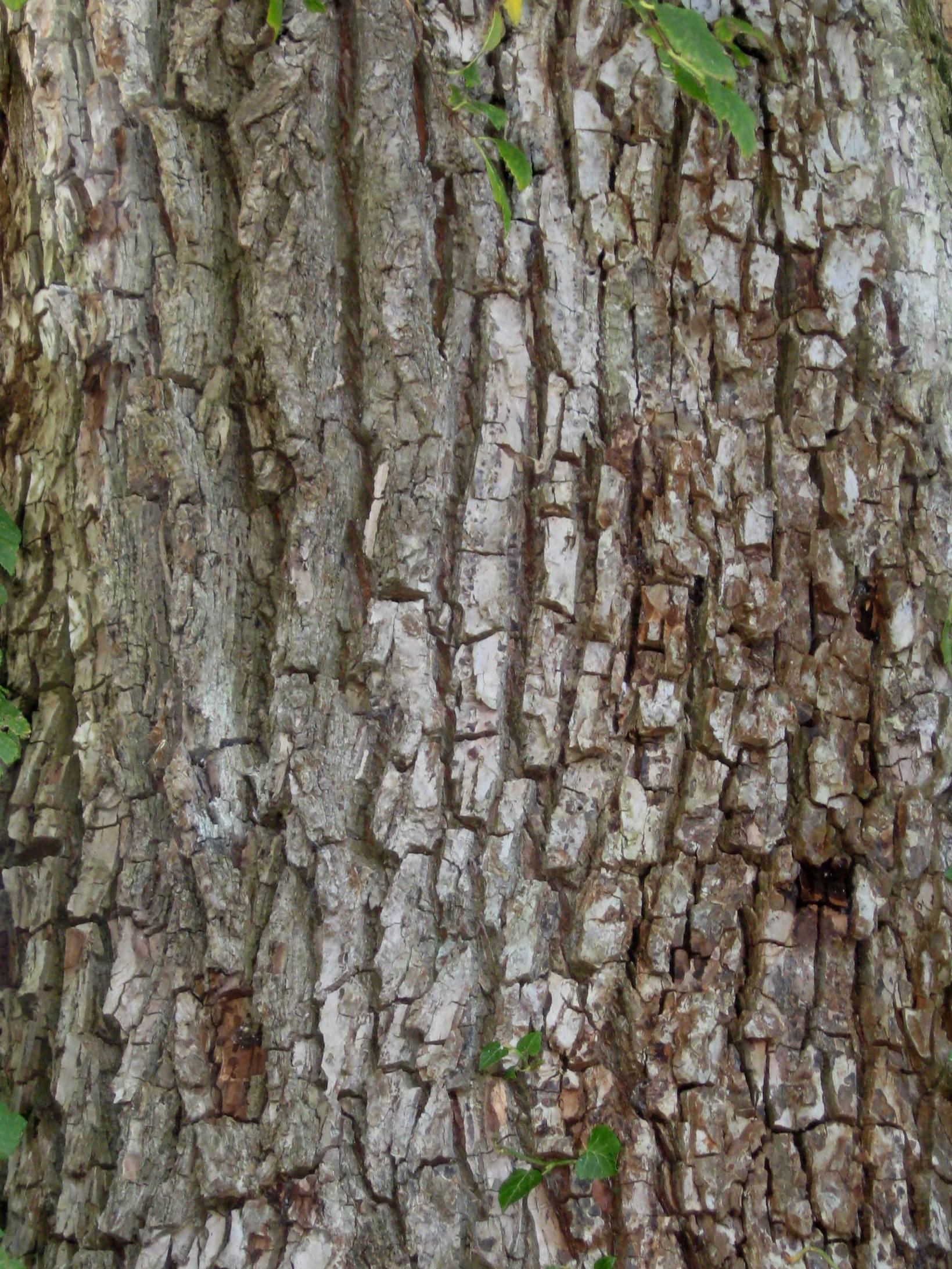
Bark of Stapleford elm, UK

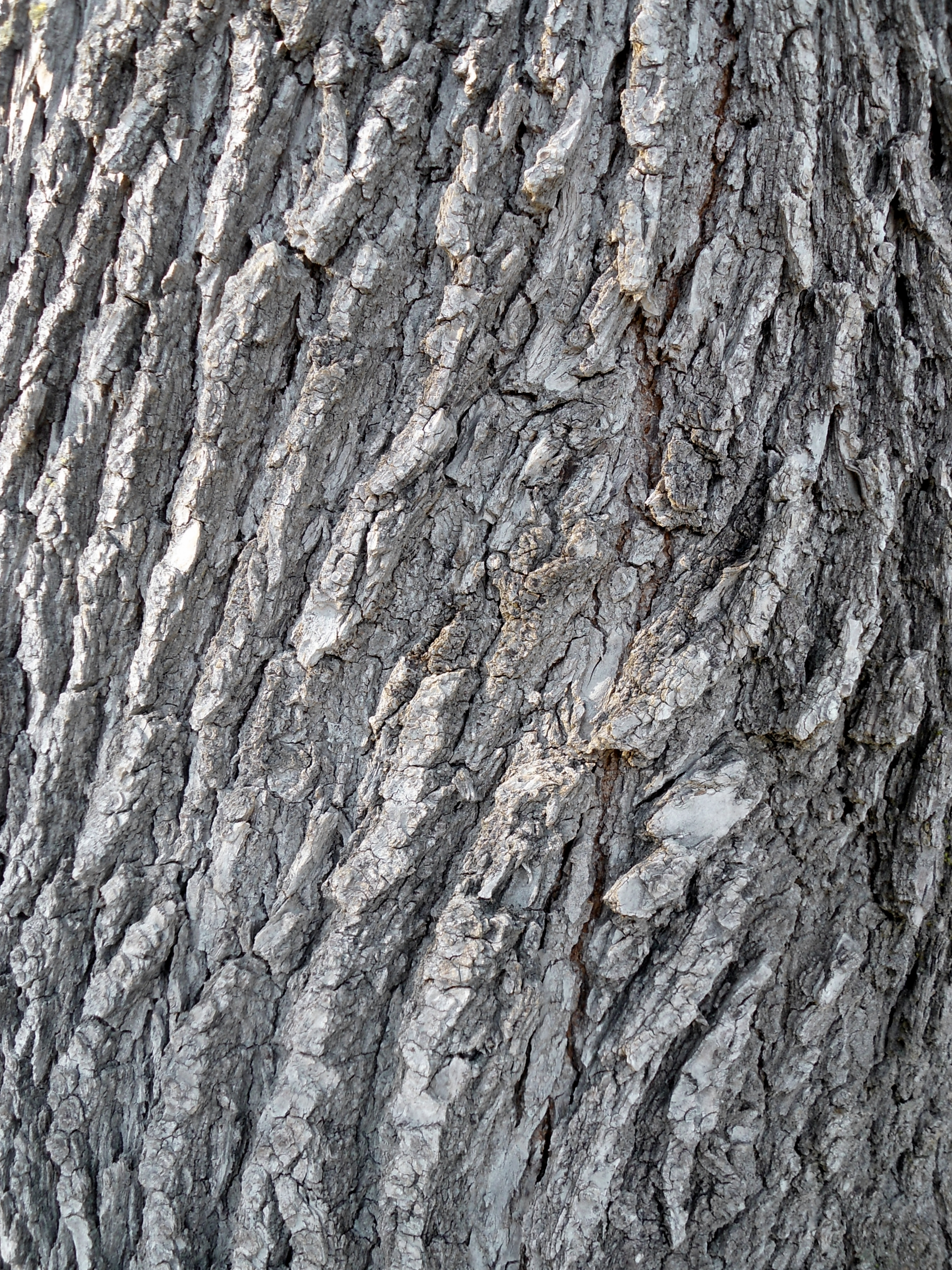
Bark of U. minor, Bulgaria

== Pests and diseases ==
The species has a hugely variable reaction to Dutch elm disease (DED), including all the fashionable pre-20th century plantsman's clones (see Subspecies and varieties). However, field elm is genetically highly variable; Italian specimens when inoculated with the pathogen displayed between 15 and 100% dieback and between 70 and 100% wilting.

Tolerance of elm yellows (phloem necrosis) is generally good, U. minor exhibiting symptoms such as the 'witch's broom' only sporadically throughout Italy, including Sicily and Sardinia, however the disease was often locally common within the species in France, including Paris.

== Cultivation ==
U. minor in general and a number of clones in particular (see 'Cultivars' below) were once commonly cultivated across Europe in town and country, but owing to its susceptibility to Dutch elm disease, U. minor is now uncommon in cultivation. However, in an ongoing project that began in the 1990s, several thousand surviving field elms have been tested for innate resistance by national research institutes in the EU, with a view to returning field elm to cultivation. Results from Spain (2013), for example, confirm that a very small number of surviving field elms (about 0.5% of those tested) appear to have comparatively high levels of tolerance of the disease, and it is hoped that a controlled crossing of the best of these will produce resistant Ulmus minor hybrids for cultivation.

In the UK, despite its late leaf-flush in the north and its suckering habits, continental U. minor was occasionally planted as an ornamental urban tree. Augustine Henry wrote in 1913 that “In all probability many of” the U. minor planted in parks in Scotland were of French origin. More recently U. minor seed was imported to the UK from Italy. There are mature survivors in Edinburgh that are not the common U. minor cultivars (2015).

U. minor was introduced, as U. campestris suberosa or simply U. suberosa, to the US and Canada, where a few old specimens survive, and to the southern hemisphere, notably Australasia and Argentina.

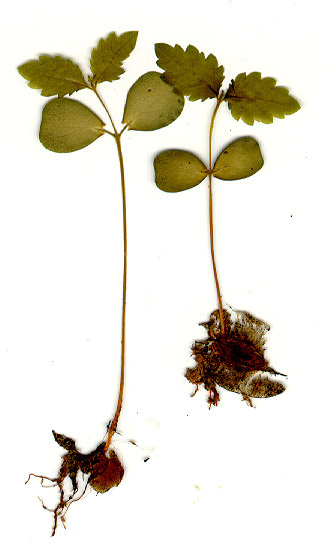
U. minor seedlings

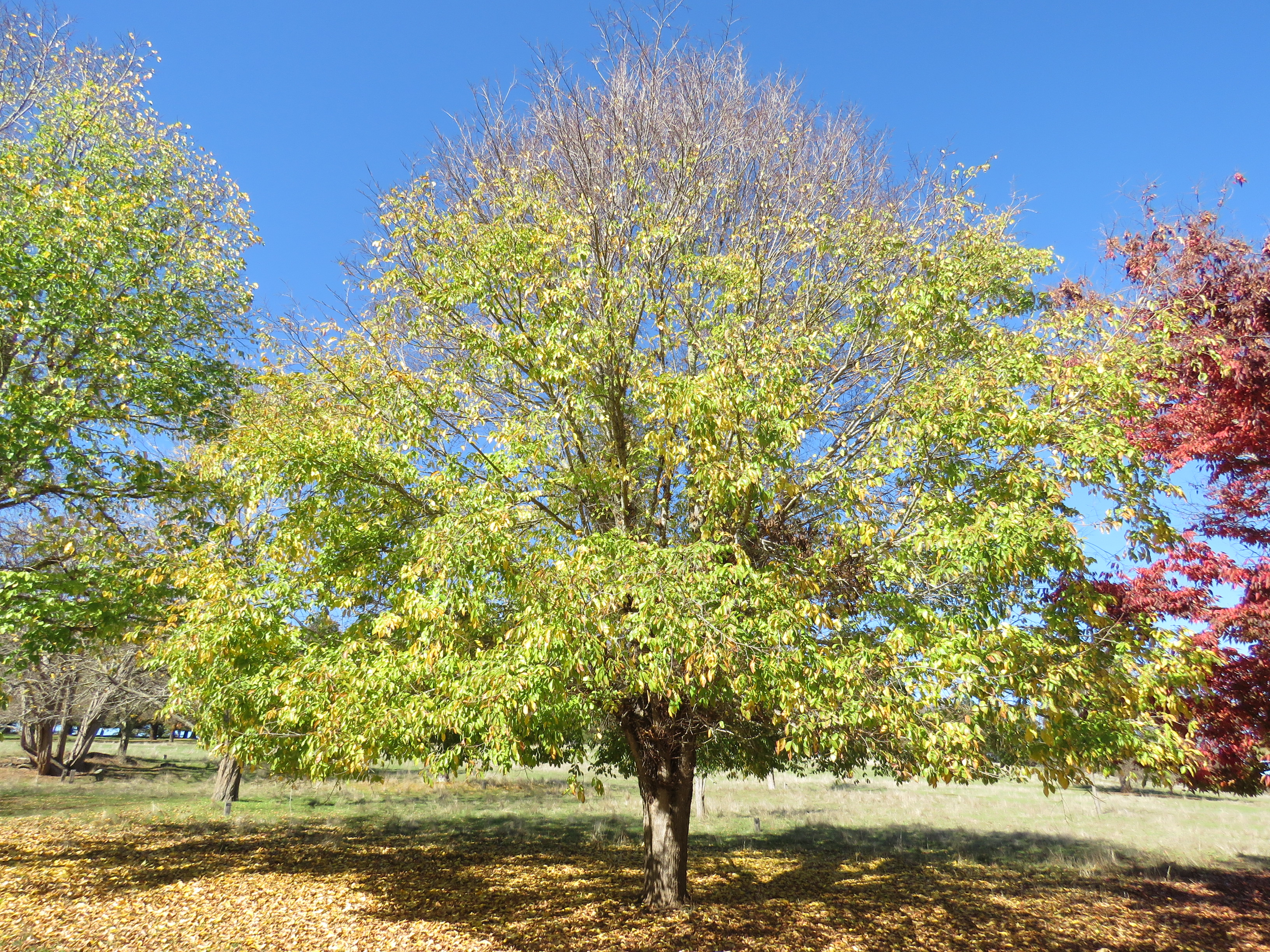
Ulmus carpinifolia [:U. minor] Golden Valley Tree Park, Western Australia (2022), planted 1994

== Notable trees ==
U. minor can live to a great age. An ancient field elm stood until recently in the village square of Metaxades, Thrace, Greece. Having abandoned their original village in 1286 after cholera outbreaks, the villagers re-founded it in the hills where a young elm was growing beside a spring. An elm (reputedly the original) and the fountain were the focal-point of the village until the late 20th century. The tallest recorded field elms in Greece were two specimens planted in 1650 beside the newly built church of the Archangels Michael and Gabriel, in Omali Voiou (Oμαλή Bοΐου) near Siatista, which, despite being open-grown trees, attained a height of 40 metres by the mid-20th century. The immemorial elm opposite the village square of Aidona in Thessaly, Greece which has been "listed" as a national "Monument of Nature", lost its crown in a recent storm (2009) and has now been pollarded; it is regenerating vigorously. A rare example of a centuries-old field elm that retains its heartwood and crown is the 360-year-old specimen in the village square of Strinylas, Corfu.

A tree said to be of similar age named The Old Elm (200 cm d.b.h.) still stands (2013) in the city of Sliven, Bulgaria; other veterans are said to survive in the village of Samuilovo, 7 km from Sliven.

In France, a tree reputedly over 650 years old survived in the centre of Biscarrosse south of Bordeaux until the summer of 2010, when it finally succumbed to Dutch elm disease. Another veteran with a 6-metre girth survives at Bettange, France, close to the Belgian border, reputedly planted in 1593. Other wrecks include 'l'ormeau de Sully' in Villesèquelande near Carcassonne, "a magnificent tree supported by three metal props", said to have been planted in the early 17th C by the Duc de Sully,

A tree approximately 400 years old and 5.55 metres in girth grows in the town of Mergozzo in Piedmont, Italy. 'L'olmo di Mergozzo', like its French counterparts 'l'orme de Biscarosse' and 'l'orme de Bettange', is hollowed out by age, its life prolonged by lopping, while in Spain the elm in the Plaza del Olmo ("Elm square" in Spanish) in Navajas, Valencia, is 6.3 metres in girth; planted in 1636 it features on the town crest.

In England, large specimens once identified as U. minor subsp. minor, the narrow- or smooth-leafed elm, were once commonplace in the eastern counties before the advent of DED. The largest recorded tree in the UK grew at Great Amwell, Hertfordshire, measuring 40 m in height and 228 cm d.b.h. in 1911. Another famous specimen was the great elm that towered above its two siblings at the bottom of Long Melford Green, Long Melford, Suffolk, till the group succumbed to disease in 1978. The three "were survivors of a former clone of at least nine elms, one dating from 1757". The Long Melford elms were painted in 1940 by the watercolourist S. R. Badmin in his 'Long Melford Green on a Frosty Morning', now in the Victoria and Albert Museum. The largest known surviving trees in England are at East Coker, Somerset (30 m high, 95 cm d.b.h.), Termitts Farm near Hatfield Peverel, Essex (25 m high, 145 d.b.h.), and Melchbourne, Bedfordshire, (147 cm d.b.h.).

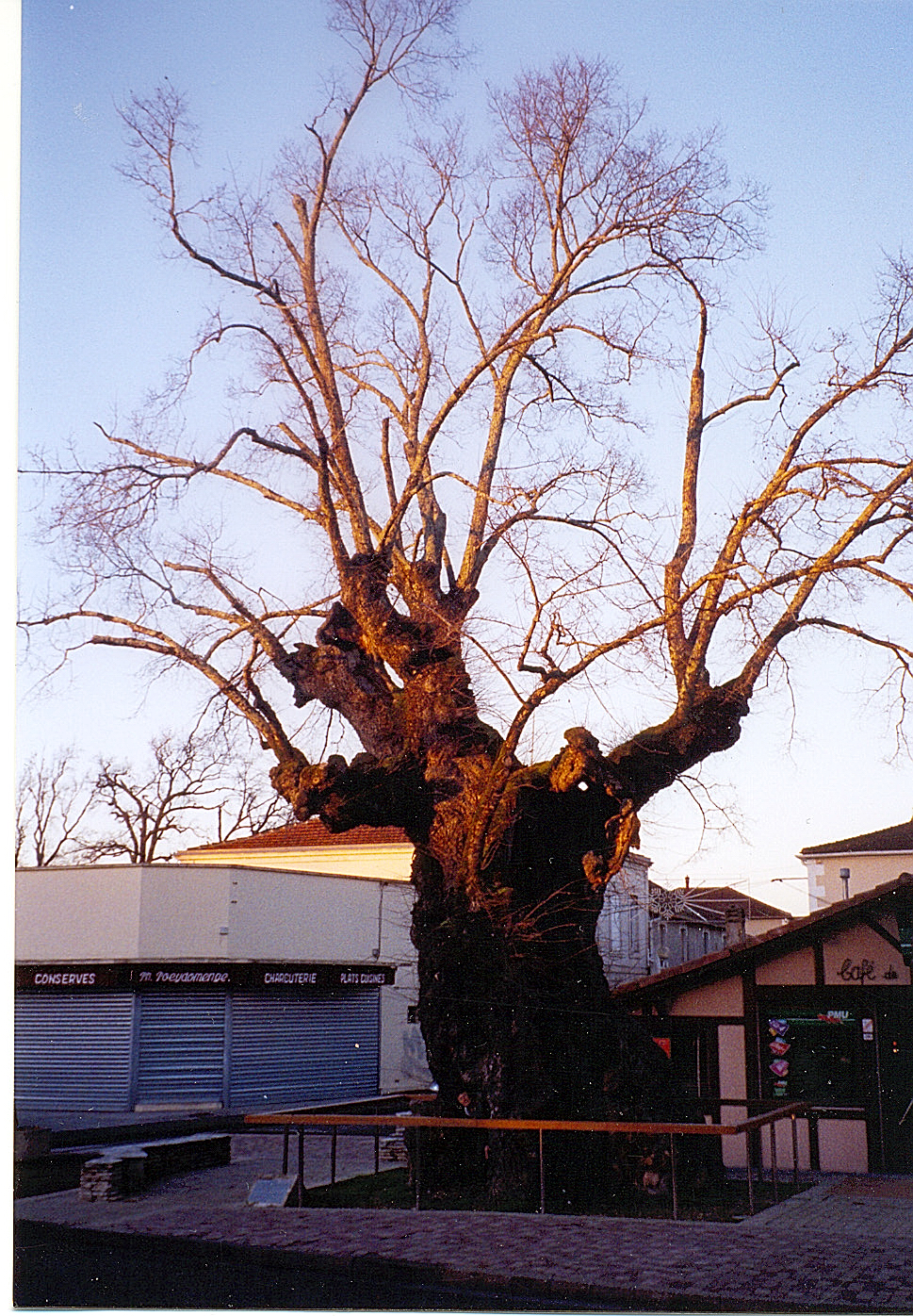
U. minor, Biscarrosse, France, died 2010

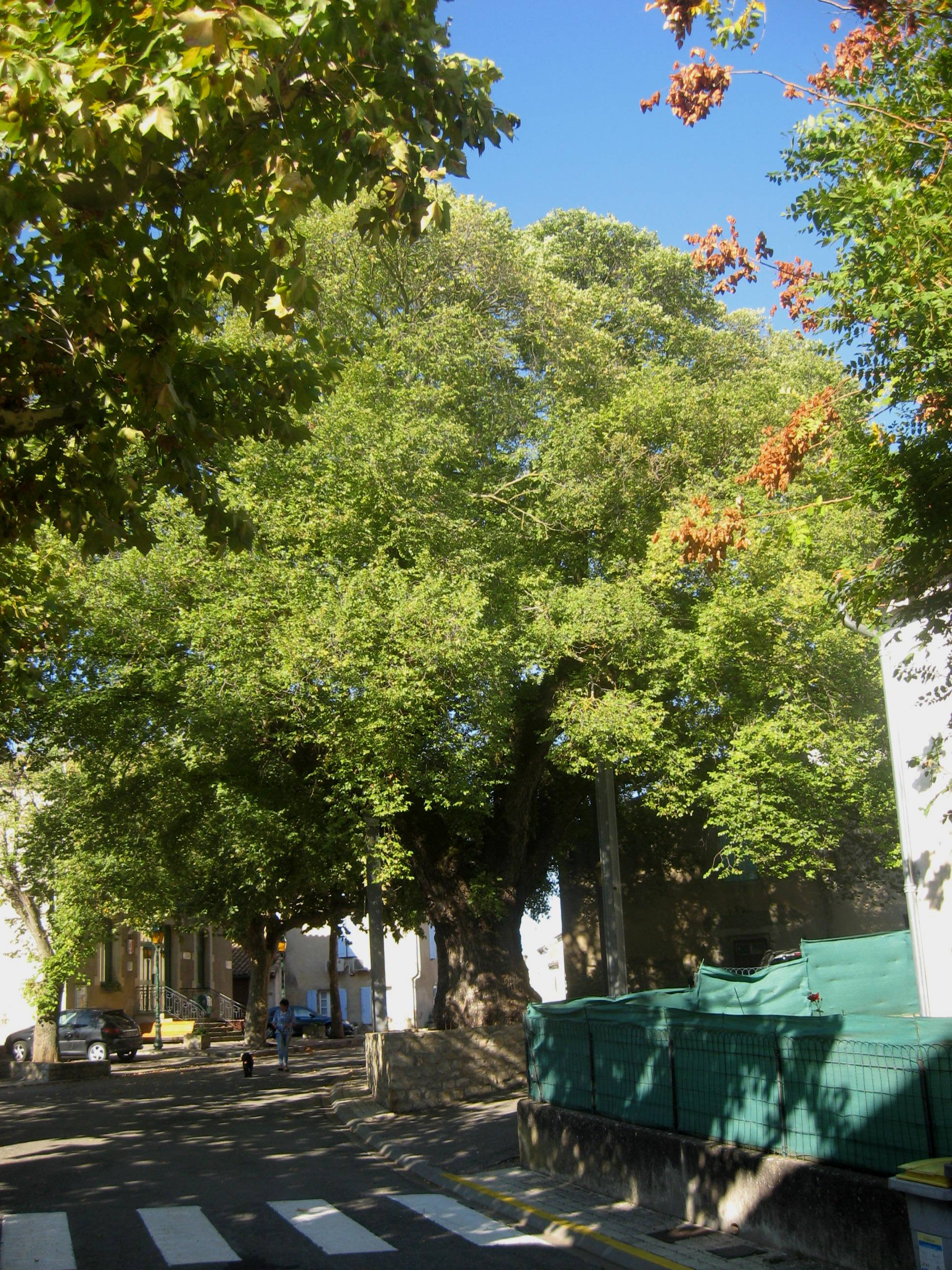
U. minor, Ville-sequelande, France, planted 17th century

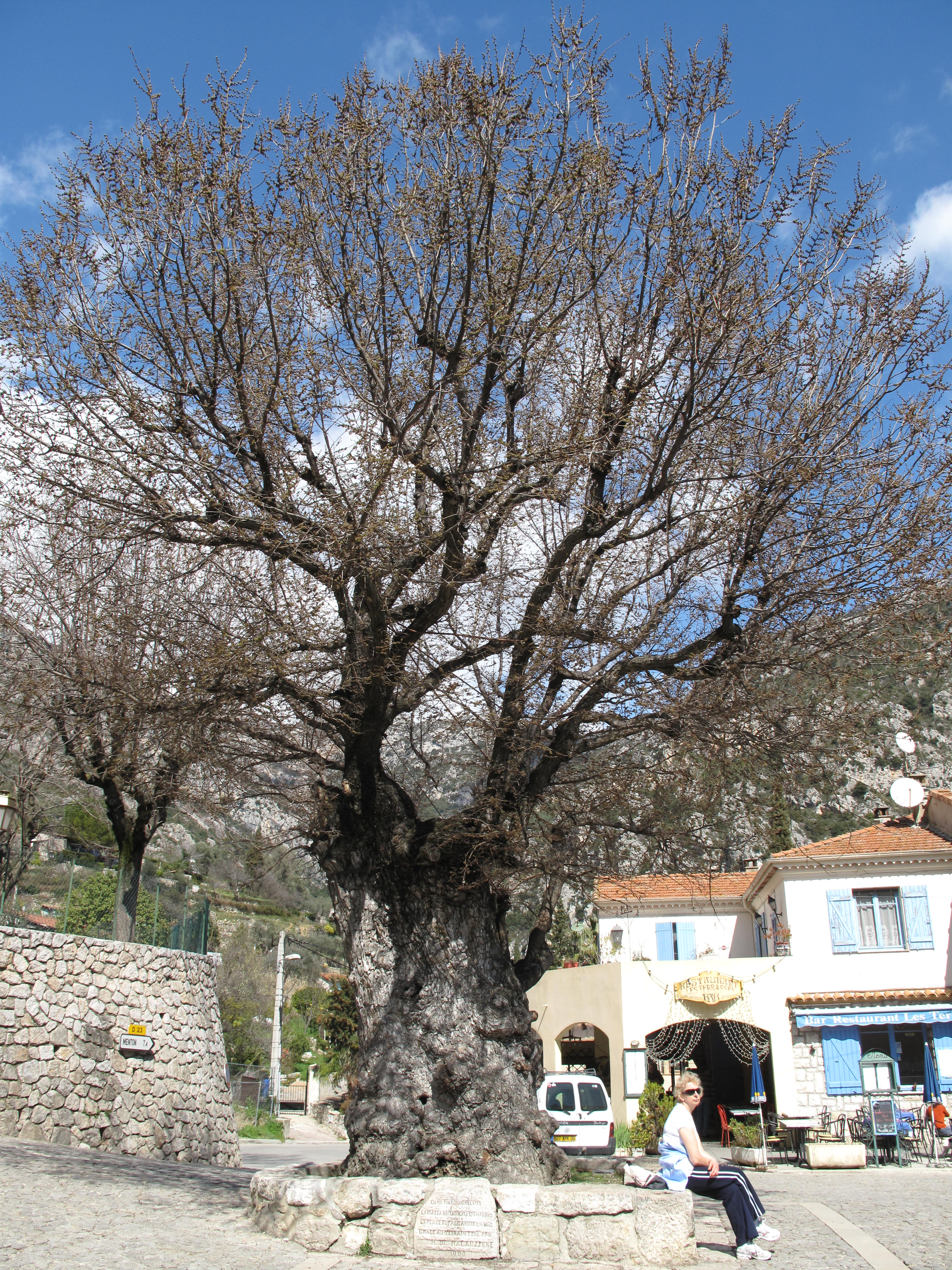
Gorbio elm, Alpes-Mariti-mes, planted 1713 (2010)

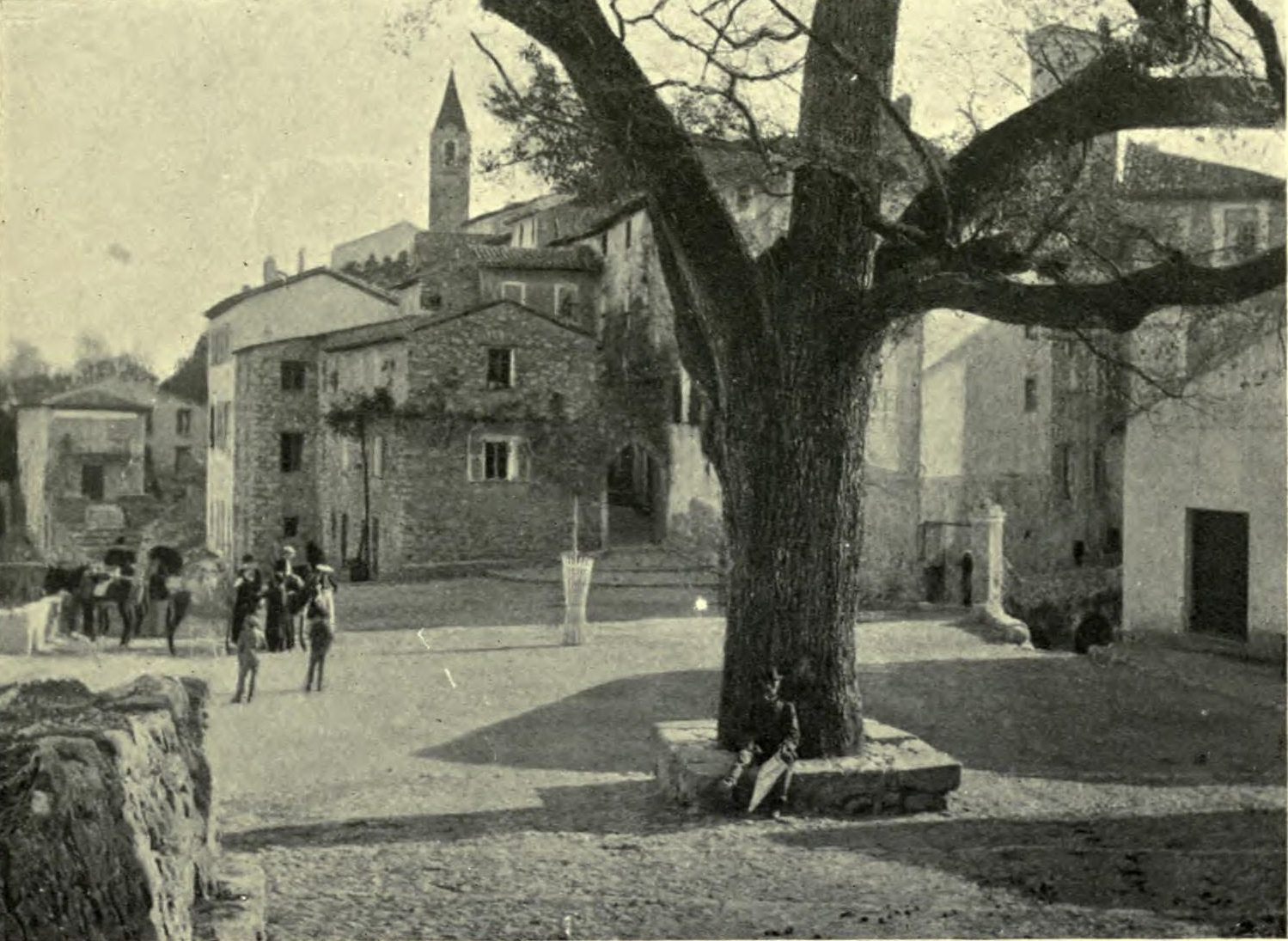
The Gorbio elm, Alpes-Maritimes, in 1910

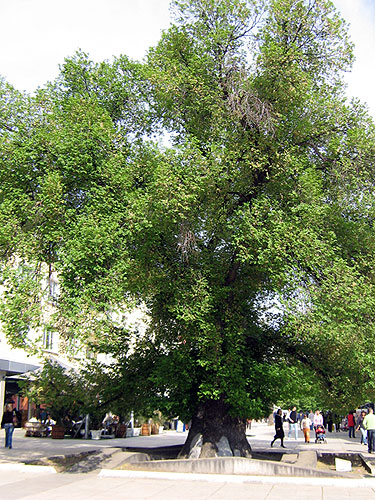
Old U. minor, Sliven, Bulgaria

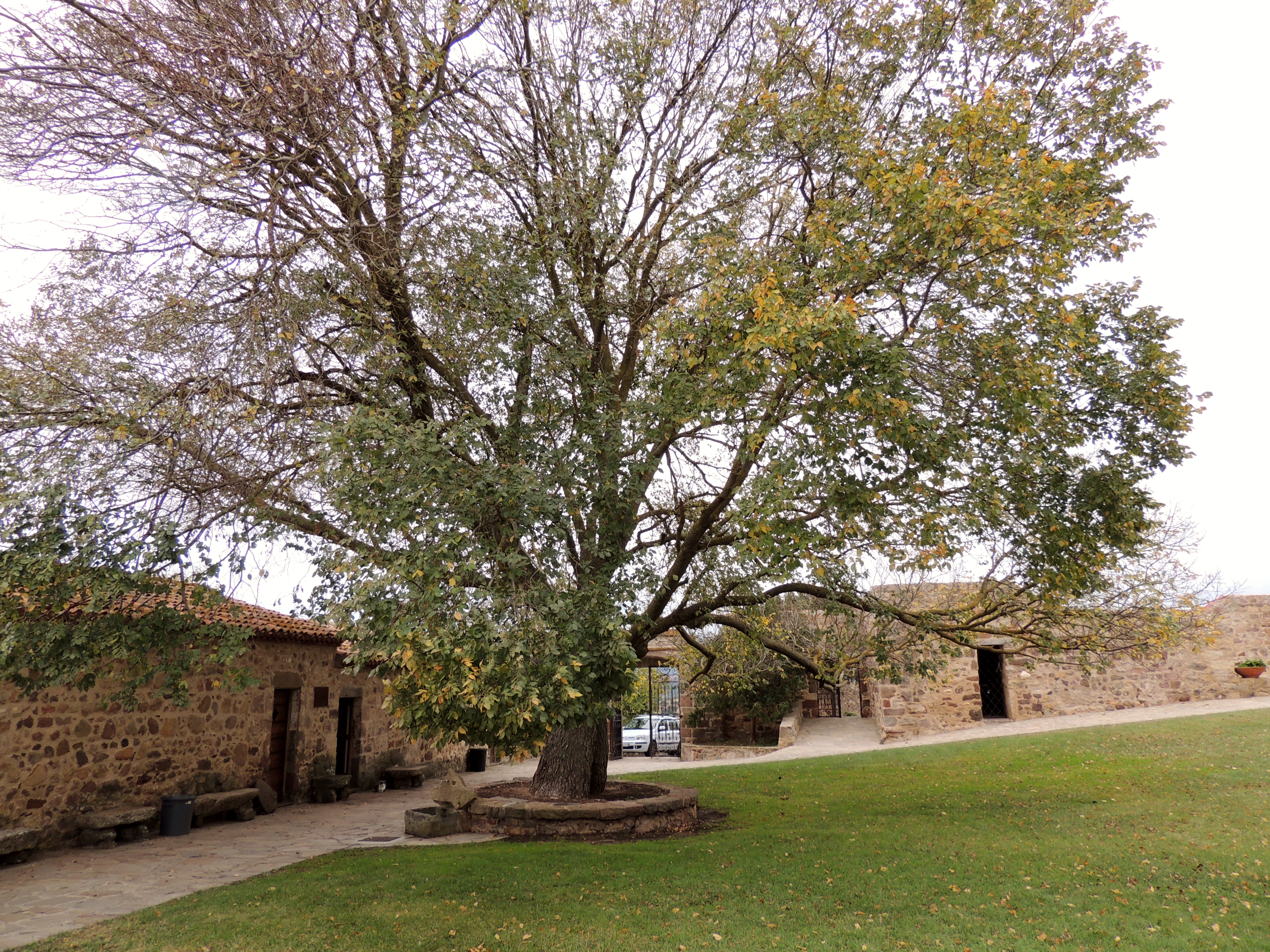
U. minor, Our Lady of Castro, Oschiri, Sardinia

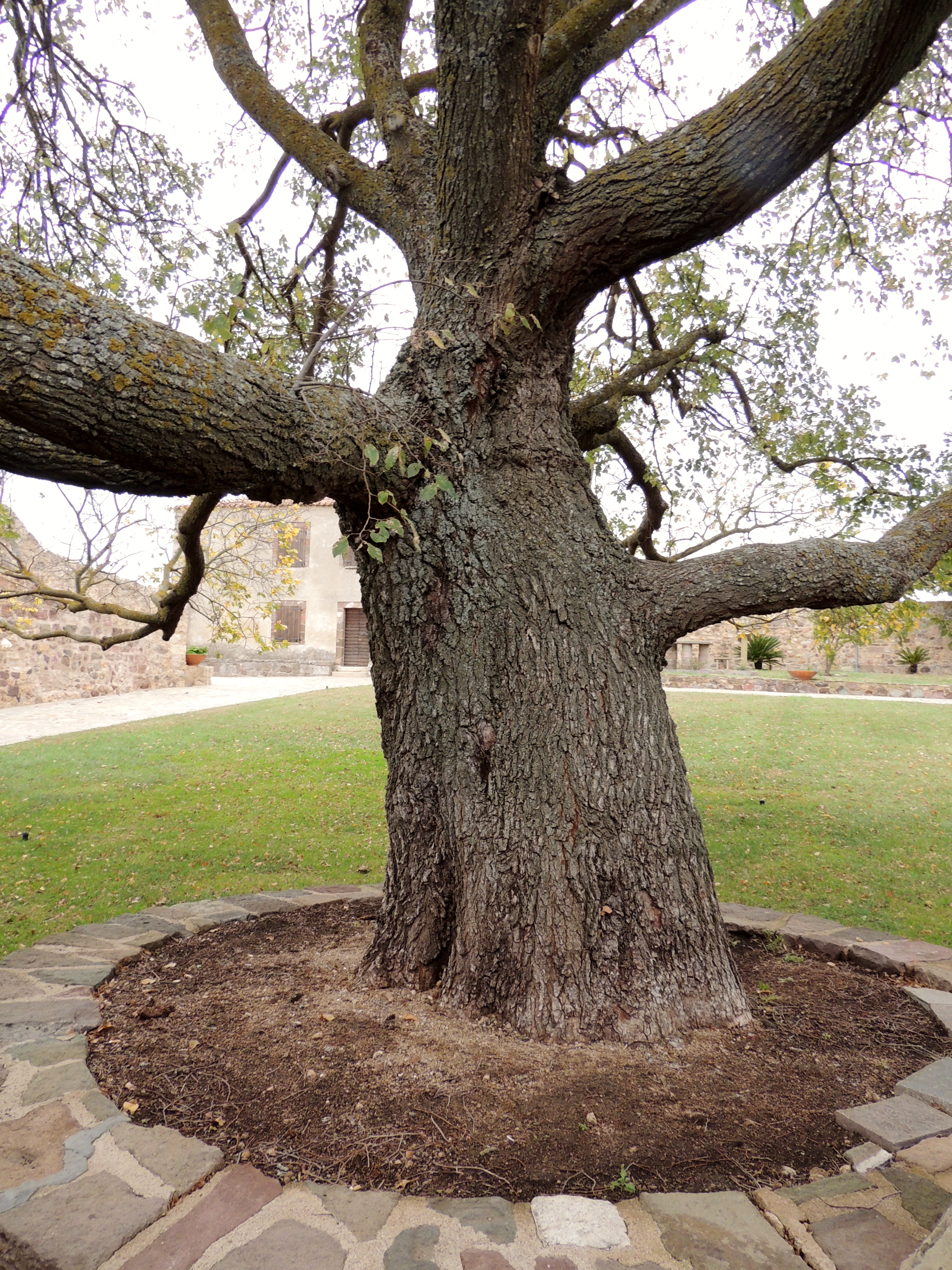
U. minor, Our Lady of Castro, Oschiri, Sardinia

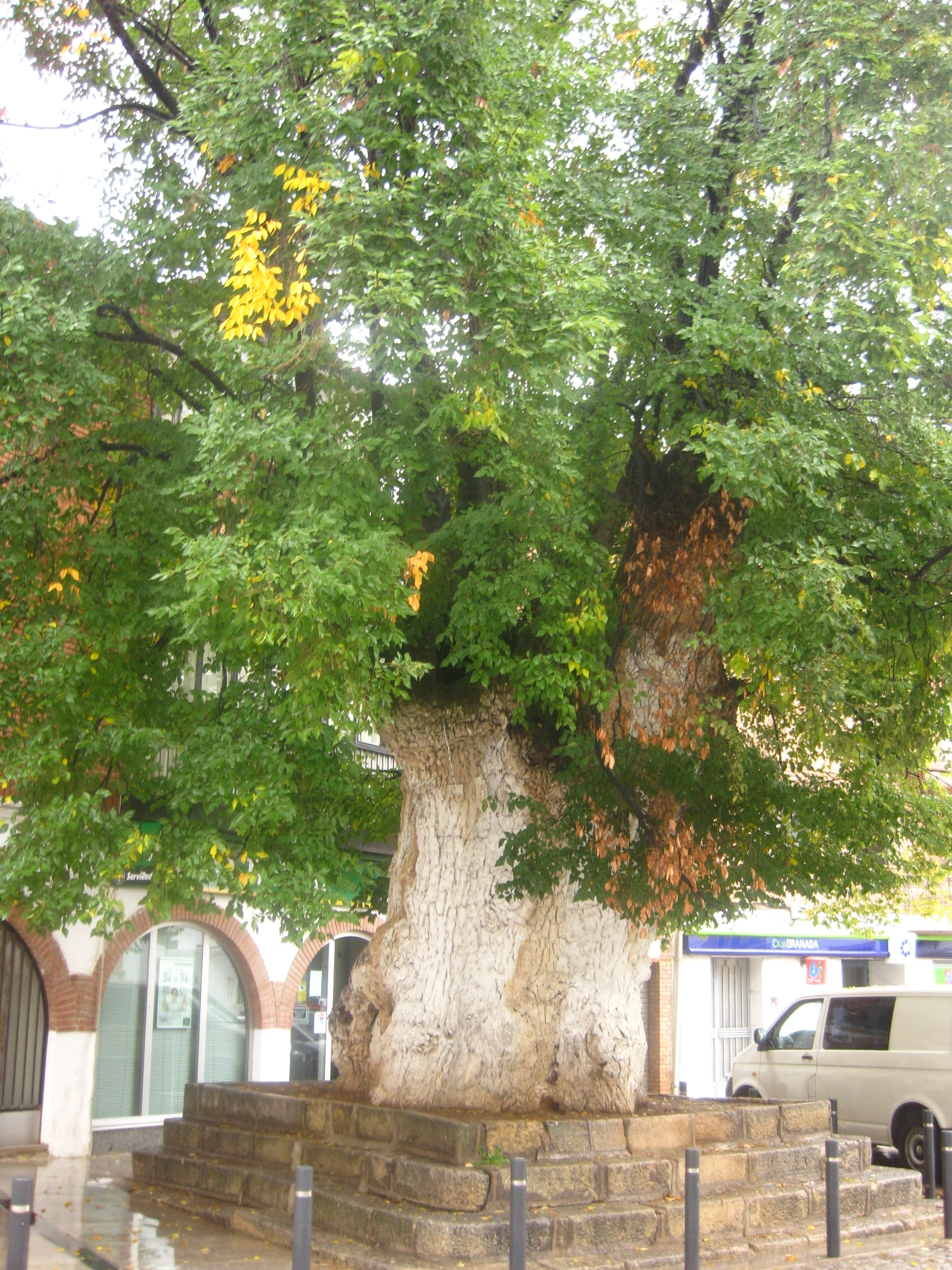
U. minor, Cambil, Andalucía, Spain (2012)

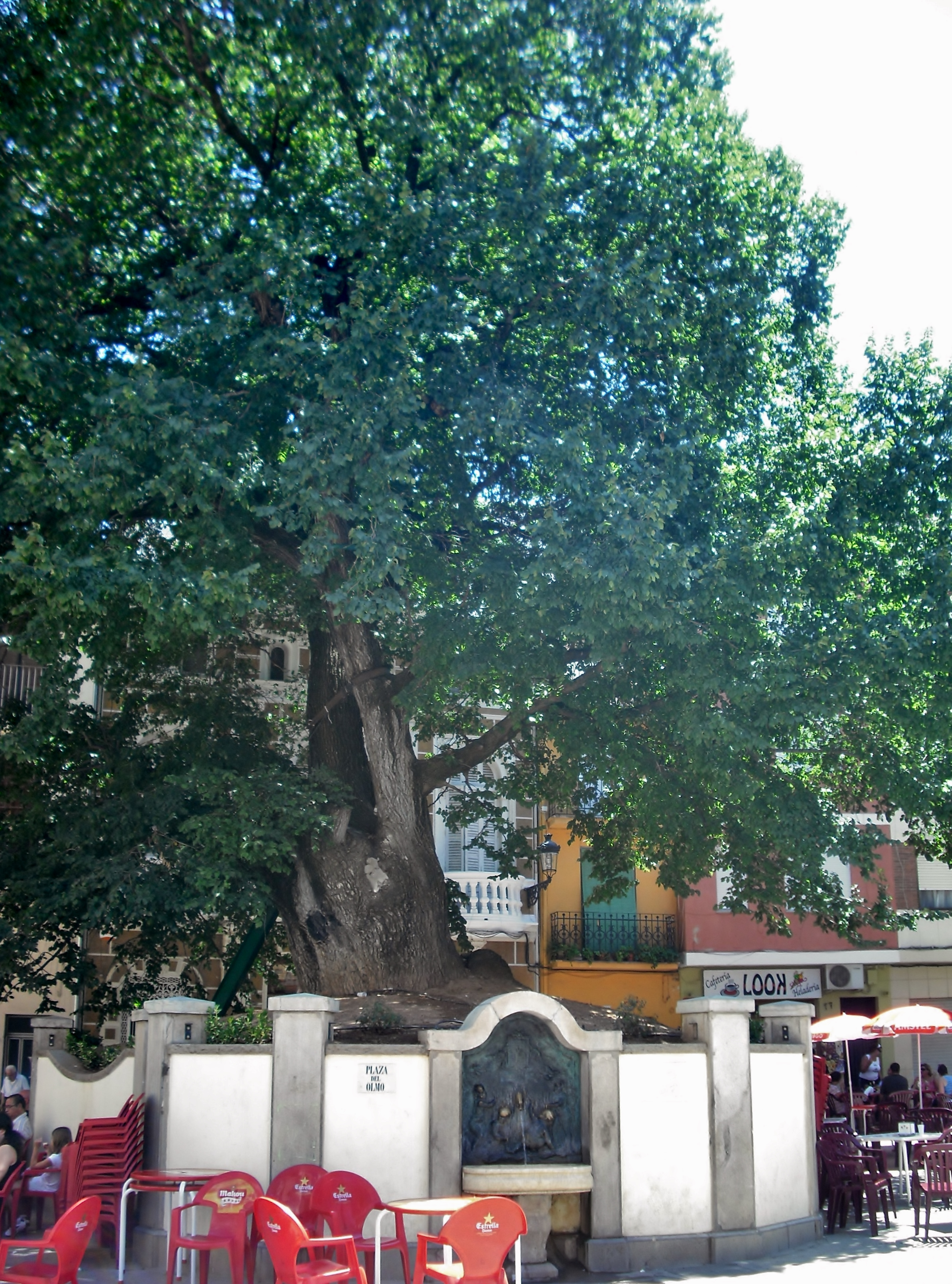
U. minor, Navajas, Valencia (2010)

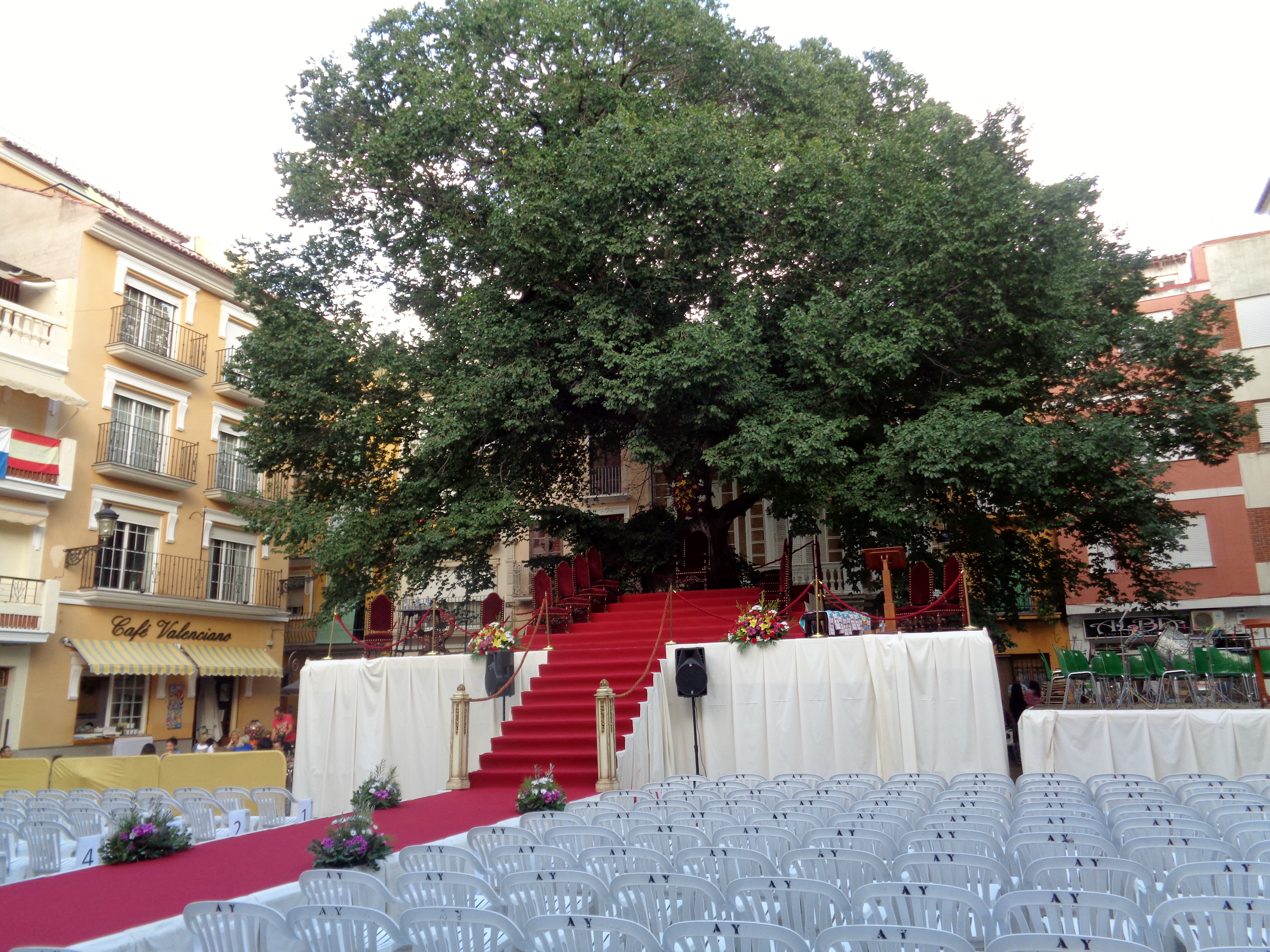
U. minor, Navajas, Valencia (2017)

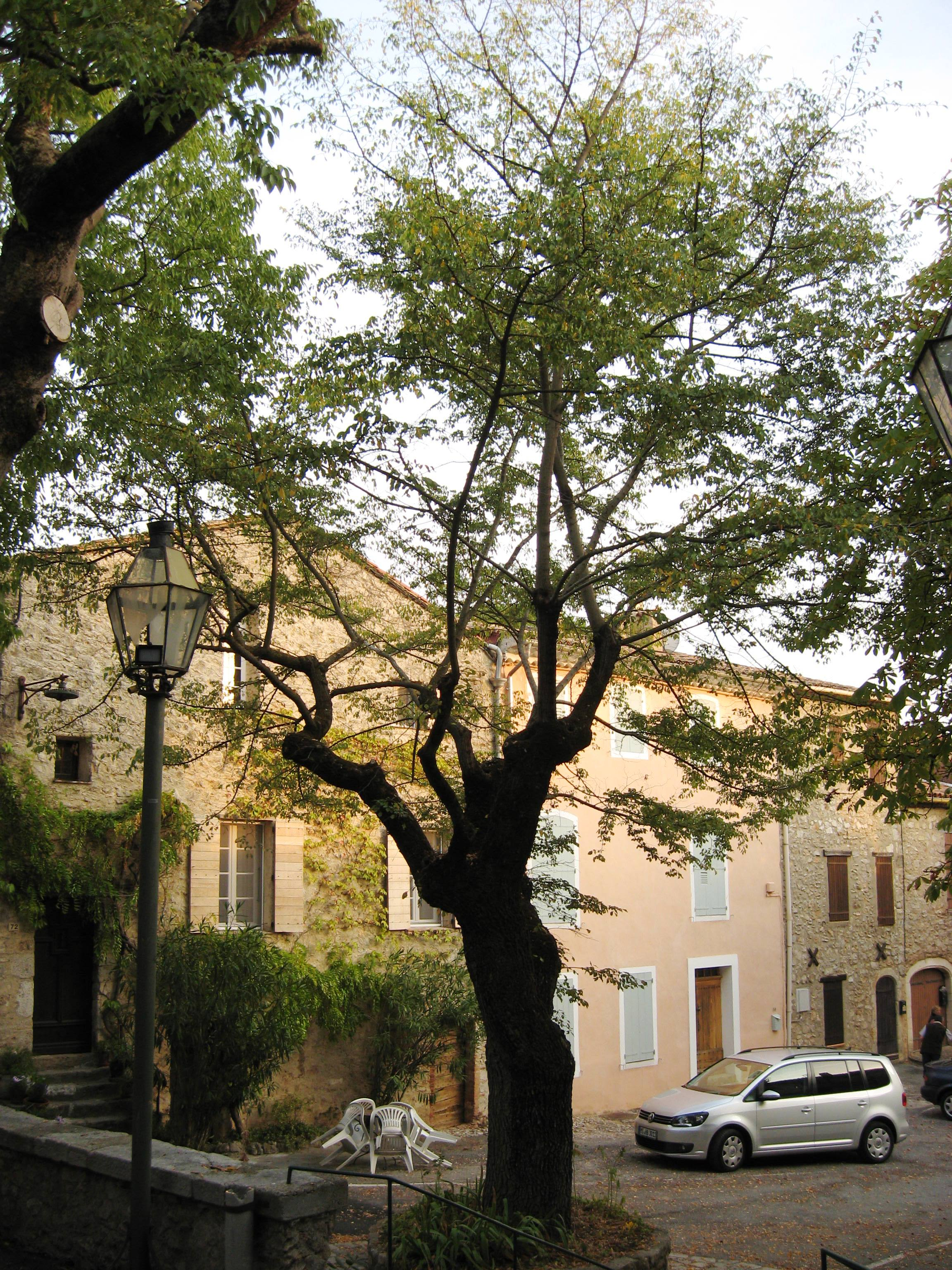
U. minor village perché Fox-Amphoux, Provence, 2017

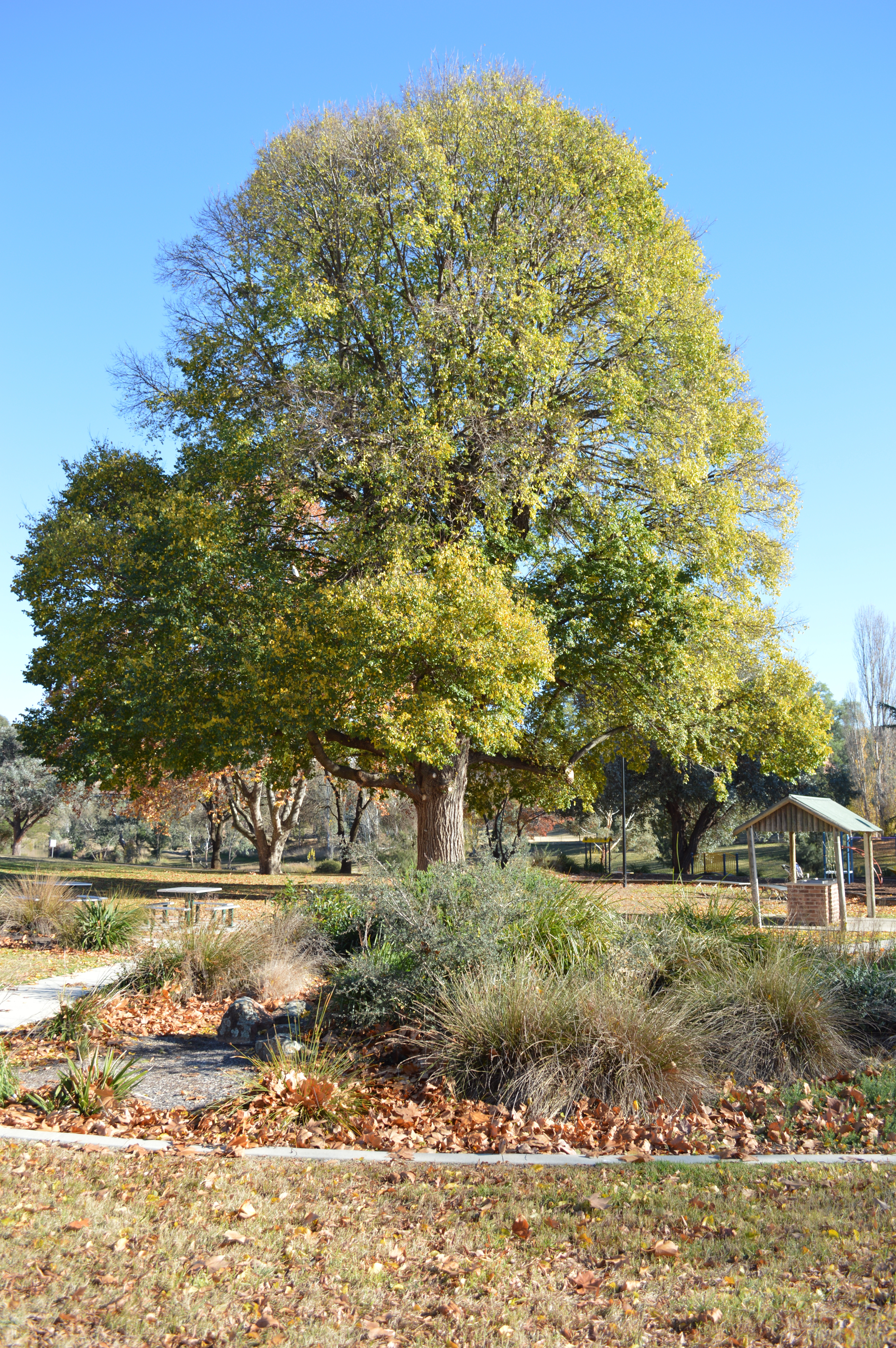
U. minor, Riverside Park, Yass, New South Wales

== Subspecies, varieties, and former species sunk as U. minor ==
=== England ===
The name Ulmus minor subsp. minor was used by R. H. Richens for field elm that was not English elm, Cornish elm, Plot elm or Guernsey elm. Many publications, however, continue to use plain Ulmus minor for undifferentiated field elm; indeed Dr Max Coleman of Royal Botanic Garden Edinburgh argued in his 2002 paper 'British Elms' that there was no clear distinction between species and subspecies. Some authorities, among them Richens and Coleman, include English elm among varieties of field elm, Richens calling English elm U. minor var. vulgaris. Richens sank as undifferentiated U. minor certain local English forms such as U. minor 'Goodyeri', U. minor 'Hunnybunii', U. minor 'Sowerbyi', and U. minor 'Coritana'.

=== Eurasia ===
Henry's Ulmus nitens var. italica, 'Mediterranean Elm' (1913), distinguished by its 14 to 18 pairs of leaf-veins, was accepted, despite the wide source-area claimed for it ("Italy, Spain, Portugal and Algeria"), as U. carpinifolia var. italica Henry, by Krüssman (1984), who included a photograph of a specimen in Gisselfeld Park, Denmark. Bean (1988), however, considered it "a variety of rather dubious standing", and it was ignored by Richens (1983).

U. canescens Melville and U. boissieri Grudz. were both sunk as U. minor by Richens. The former is found throughout the eastern Mediterranean, including Palestine and Israel, and is distinguished by its leaves, densely downy on the underside when mature. The latter is a little-known tree found in Iran, in the Zagros forests and the Kerman / Kermanshah area. Green and Richens also sank U. minor var. suberosa (Moench) Rehder - the so-called 'Cork-barked elm', korkulme (Germany) or wiąz korkowa (Poland), as a genetically random, maritime or juvenile form of U. minor, insufficiently differentiated to merit varietal status, its name a relic of taxonomic conservatism.

== Cultivars ==
Numerous cultivars have been raised in Europe since the 18th century, although many are now probably either extinct owing to the ravages of Dutch elm disease, or survive unrecognized in sucker form:

- Albo-Dentata
- Amplifolia
- Argenteo-Variegata
- Atinia
- Atinia Pyramidalis
- Atinia Variegata
- Bea Schwarz
- Betulaefolia
- Biltii
- Concavaefolia
- Coritana
- Cloud Corky
- Cretensis
- Cucullata
- Cucullata Variegata
- Dehesa de la Villa
- Dicksonii
- Dijkwel
- Erecta
- Folia Alba-Punctata
- Glandulosa
- Goodyeri
- Hoersholmiensis
- Holmstruph
- Hunnybunii
- Hunnybunii pseudo-Stricta
- Jos van Slycken
- Laciniata
- Lanuginosa
- Microphylla Pendula
- Microphylla Purpurea
- Microphylla Rubra
- Monumentalis
- Pendula
- Picturata
- Plotii
- Propendens
- Punctata
- Purpurascens
- Purpurea
- Retiro
- Reverti
- Rugosa
- Rueppellii
- Sarniensis
- Schuurhoek
- Silvery Gem
- Sowerbyi
- Stricta
- Suberosa
- Umbraculifera
- Umbraculifera Gracilis
- Viminalis
- Viminalis Aurea
- Viminalis Betulaefolia
- Viminalis Gracilis
- Viminalis Incisa
- Viminalis Marginata
- Viminalis Pendula
- Viminalis Pulverulenta
- Viminalis Stricta
- Virgata
- Webbiana
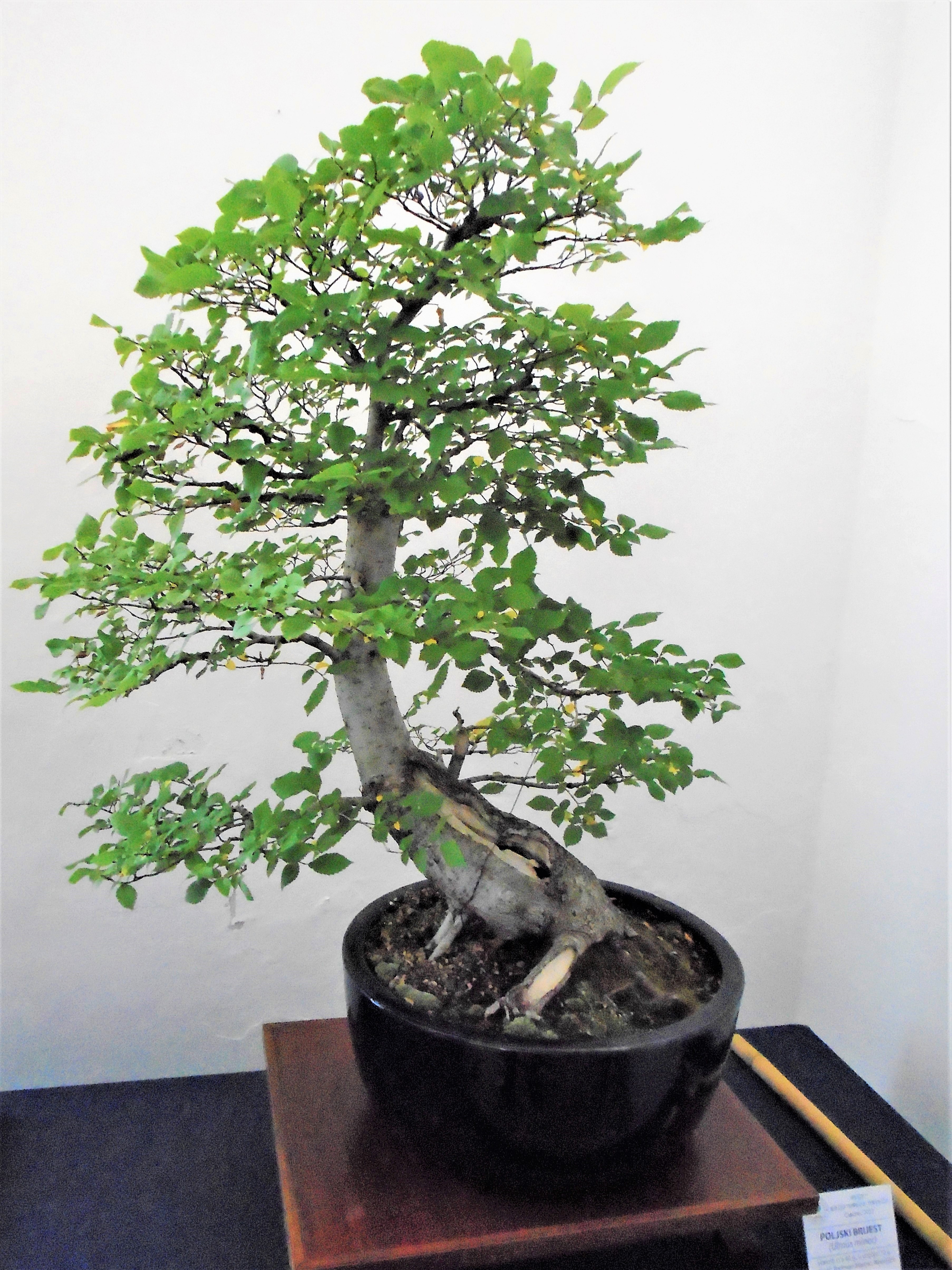
Bonsai field elm

== Hybrids ==
The tree's natural range generously overlaps that of wych elm Ulmus glabra to the north, and readily hybridizes with it to produce the so-called 'Dutch elm' Ulmus × hollandica.

In Spain and Italy Ulmus minor has naturally hybridized with Siberian elm U. pumila. In Spain U. pumila was introduced in the 16th century and has since spread widely, contributing to conservation concerns for U. minor. In Italy U. pumila was introduced in the 1930s; research is ongoing into the extent of its hybridisation with U. minor. The resulting hybrid has not yet been given a formal botanical name, though there are cultivated forms such as 'Recerta' and 'Fiorente' (see 'Hybrid cultivars').

- Ulmus × hollandica
- Ulmus davidiana var. japonica × U. minor
- U. minor × U. pumila

== Hybrid cultivars ==
U. minor hybridises naturally with U. glabra, producing elms of the Ulmus × hollandica group, from which there have arisen a number of cultivars:

- Ademuz
- Alba
- Angustifolia
- Balder
- Belgica
- Blandford
- Canadian Giant
- Cicestria
- Cinerea
- Commelin
- Dampieri
- Dauvessei
- Daveyi
- Dehesa de Amaniel
- Dovaei
- Dumont
- Elegantissima
- Eleganto-Variegata
- Etrusca
- Fastigiata
- Fjerrestad
- Folia Rhomboidea
- Freja
- Fulva
- Gaujardii
- Groeneveld
- Haarlemensis
- Klemmer
- Loke
- Macrophylla Aurea
- Majadahonda
- Major
- Microphylla
- Modiolina
- Muscaviensis
- Nottingham
- Odin
- Pioneer
- Pitteurs
- Serpentina
- Smithii
- Superba
- Tricolor
- Tyr
- Vegeta
- Viminalis
- Viscosa
- Wentworthii Pendula
- Wredei
- Ypreau

The tree has featured strongly in artificial hybridization experiments in Europe and to a lesser extent in the United States. The hybrid Ulmus davidiana var. japonica × U. minor was raised at the Arnold Arboretum before 1924. Most of the European research was based at Wageningen in the Netherlands until 1992, whence a number of hybrid cultivars have been commercially released since 1960. The earlier trees were raised in response to the initial Dutch elm disease pandemic that afflicted Europe after the First World War, and were to prove vulnerable to the much more virulent strain of the disease that arrived in the late 1960s. However, further research eventually produced several trees highly resistant to disease which were released after 1989.

- Arno, Clusius, Columella, Commelin, Den Haag, Fiorente, Frontier, Fuente Umbria, Groeneveld, Homestead, Lobel, Nanguen = Lutèce, Pioneer, Plantyn, Plinio, Recerta, San Zanobi, Toledo, Urban, Wanoux = Vada

== In art ==
The elms by Willy Lott's Cottage and Flatford Mill, Suffolk, in Constable's paintings and drawings were, according to Richens, "smooth-leaved elm" (U. minor), though the hedgerow elms in his Dedham Vale and East Bergholt landscape-paintings and drawings were otherwise "most probably East Anglian hybrid elms ... such as still grow in the same hedges".

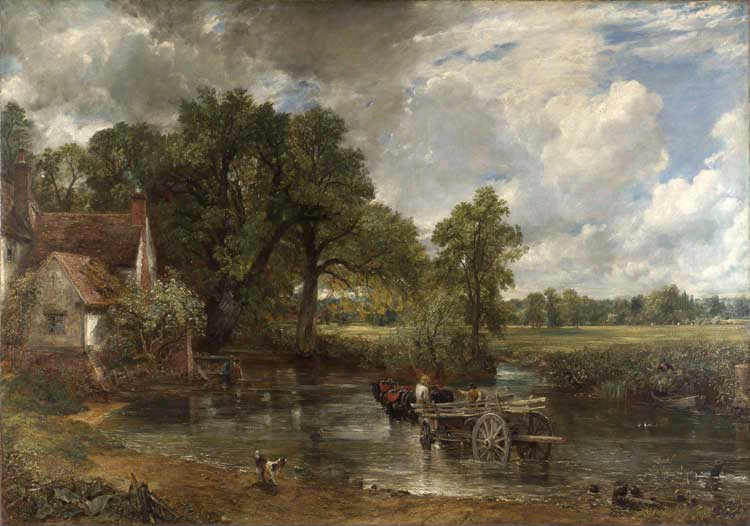
Field elm beside Willy Lott's Cottage in Constable's The Hay Wain (1821)

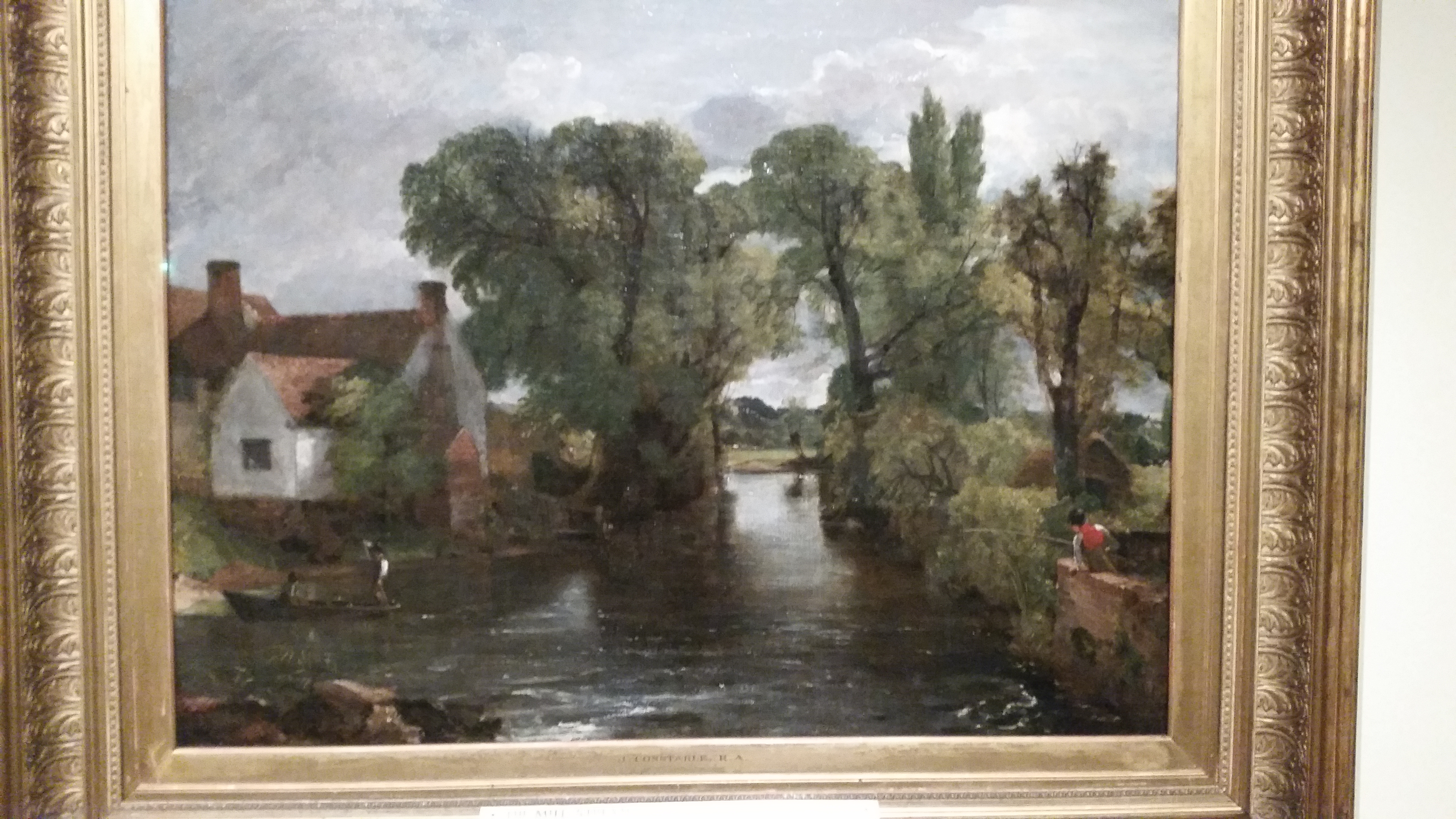
The same, in Constable's Flatford Lock, Christchurch Mansion, Ipswich

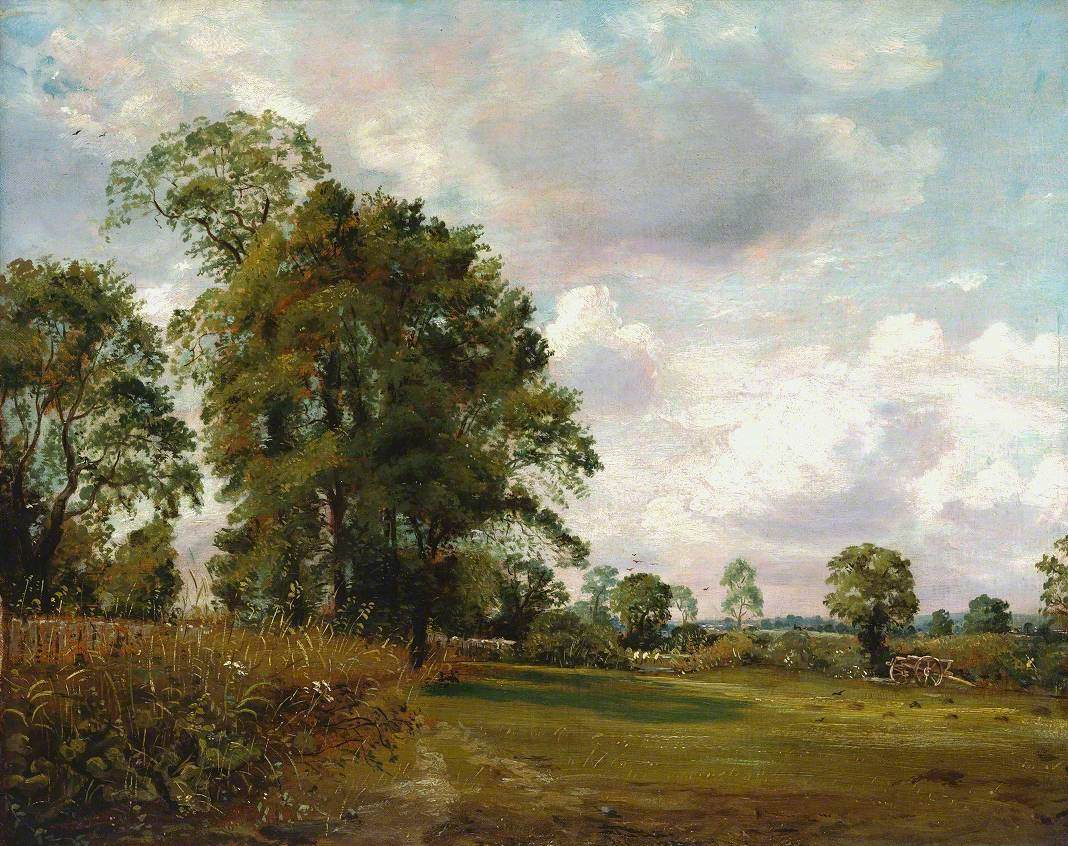
East Anglian field elms in Near Stoke-by-Nayland by Lionel Bicknell Constable (1828-1887)

== Accessions ==
=== North America ===
- United States National Arboretum, Washington, D.C., US. Acc. nos. 12852, 64382.

=== Europe ===
- Arboretum de La Petite Loiterie , Monthodon, France. No details available
- Cambridge Botanic Garden , University of Cambridge, UK. No accession details available.
- Dubrava Arboretum, Lithuania. No details available.
- Grange Farm Arboretum, Sutton St James, Spalding, Lincolnshire, UK. Acc. no. not known.
- Linnaean Gardens of Uppsala, Finland. Acc. no. 1930-1013.
- Royal Botanic Garden Edinburgh, UK. Acc. nos. 19699368, 16899359, 19699365.
- Royal Botanic Gardens, Kew, UK. Acc. no. not known.
- Sir Harold Hillier Gardens, Hampshire, UK. Acc. no. 2001-0188, 3 specimens collected in Iran, 2000.
- Strona Arboretum, University of Life Sciences, Warsaw, Poland. No details available.

=== Australasia ===
- Eastwoodhill Arboretum , Gisborne, New Zealand. 2 trees, details not known.

== Nurseries ==
=== North America ===
None known

=== Europe ===
- Eggleston Hall Gardens , Eggleston, Barnard Castle, County Durham, UK
- Firecrest Tree & Shrub Nursery , Woodbridge, Suffolk, UK
- Lorenz von Ehren , Hamburg, Germany
- Trees & Hedges , Heathfield, East Sussex, UK
- UmbraFlor , Spello, Italy
