= Ulmus minor 'Microphylla Rubra' =

Elm cultivar

- Species: Ulmus minor
- Cultivar: 'Microphylla Rubra'
- Origin: Europe

The Field Elm cultivar Ulmus minor 'Microphylla Rubra' was listed by C. de Vos in Handboek, 203, 1887, as Ulmus campestris microphylla rubra but did not include a description.

== Description ==
Not available.

== Cultivation ==
No specimens are known to survive.
