= Ulmus boissieri =

Scientific classification (disputed)
- Kingdom: Plantae
- Clade: Tracheophytes
- Clade: Angiosperms
- Clade: Eudicots
- Clade: Rosids
- Order: Rosales
- Family: Ulmaceae
- Genus: Ulmus
- Species: U. boissieri

Binomial name
- Ulmus boissieri Grudz.

Synonyms
- Ulmus campestris Huds. var. microphylla Boiss.; Ulmus microphylla Pers.; Ulmus minor Mill.

Species of tree

Ulmus boissieri Grudz., (Persian: نارون برگ‌ریز or نارون گل‌پشه‌ای), a disputed species of elm found in Iran, was identified by Grudzinskaya in 1977. She equated her "new species" with the U. campestris f. microphylla collected in 1859 in Kerman Province and described in his Flora Orientalis (1879) by Boissier, for whom she named it, treating Boissier's specimen as the "type". The tree is endemic the provinces of Kermanshah (Qasr-e Shirin, Bisotun) and Kerman., and also the Zagros forests, growing with Quercus brantii, Celtis australis, Platanus orientalis, Fraxinus sp., and Cerasus mahaleb.

Although two more recent Iranian treatises maintain the original taxon, Richens (1983), in line with Boissier's original U. campestris identification, sank U. boissieri as Ulmus minor, along with six other elms considered species by Soviet botanists. Grudzinskaya (1977) incorrectly stated that "U. boissieri was described by Boissier in the rank of a species". Boissier had in fact listed his small-leaved Persian elm as a form of the species, U. campestris. Grudzinskaya (1977) does not refer to the diagnostic field-elm feature of root-suckering.

== Description ==
Ulmus boissieri is distinguished by its small leaves and fruits. The ovate, toothed leaves are 1.5 – 3 cm long, 1.2 – 2 cm broad, typically asymmetric at the base, the upper surfaces glabrous. The leaf veins number from 8 to 12; the petiole 2 – 3 mm long. The perfect apetalous wind-pollinated flowers are minute; the suborbiculate samarae 7 – 9 mm in diameter, with the seed located in the centre.

Boissier's 1859 herbarium specimen (Grudzinskaya's "type" tree) shows 'Rueppellii'-like leaves and samarae, a field elm from neighbouring Turkestan.

== Pests and diseases ==
Not known.

== Cultivation ==
The extent of cultivation within Iran is unknown. Aside from the old field elm cultivar 'Umbraculifera', elm specimens from Iran are extremely rare in cultivation outside the country (see 'Putative specimens' below).

=== Putatative specimens ===
Four putative specimens from Iran are grown at the Sir Harold Hillier Gardens, UK (see 'Accessions').

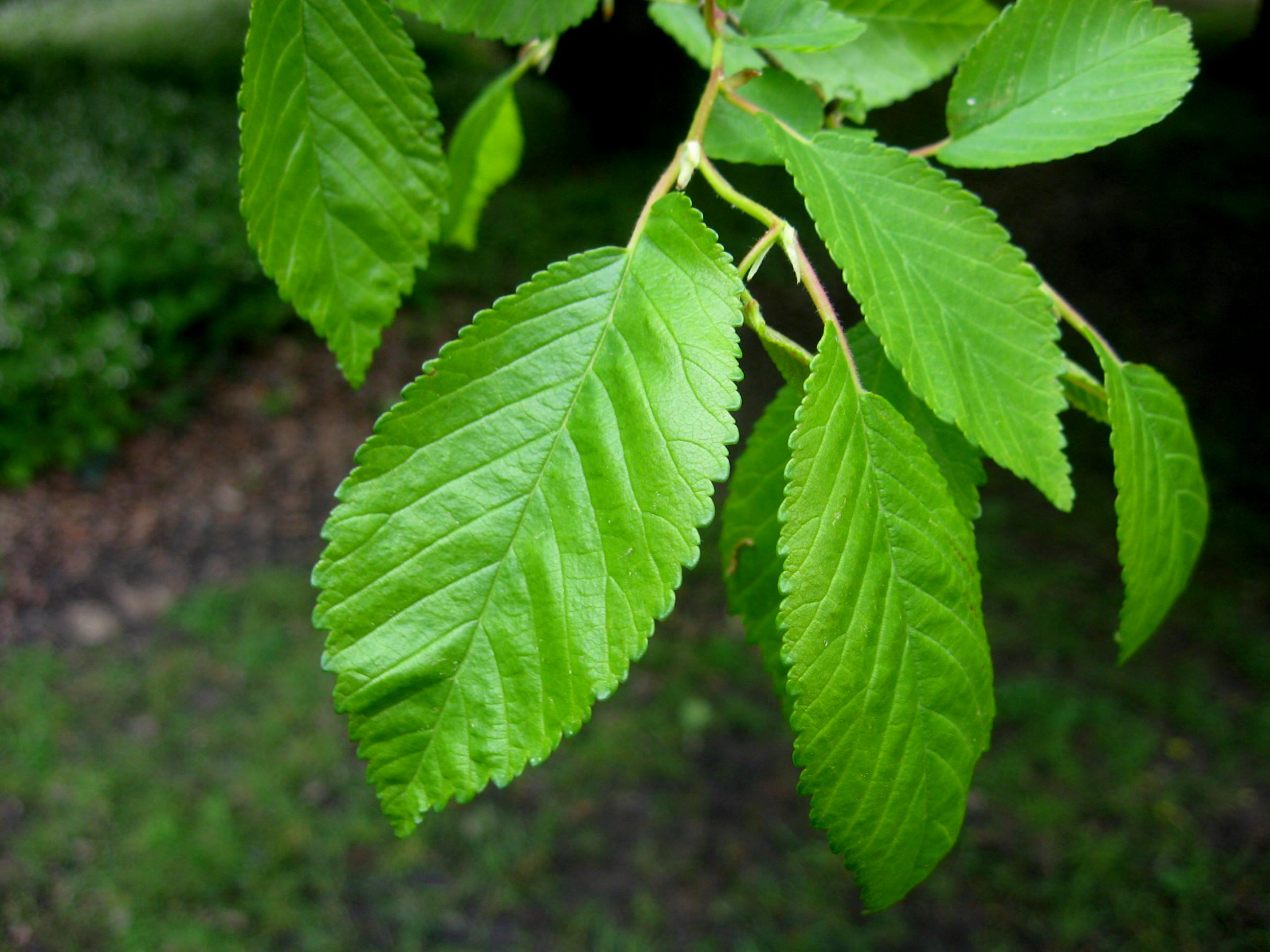
Foliage of putative U. boissieri, identified as 'U. minor Iran' at SHHG

== Accessions ==
=== Europe ===
- Sir Harold Hillier Gardens, Ampfield, Hampshire, England. Acc. no. 2001.0188, 4 putative specimens grown from wild collected seed in Iran by D & S Pigott 2000. Plant Centre Field, marked only as Ulmus minor, Iran.
