= Leith Links =

Public park in Edinburgh, Scotland

Coordinates: 55°58′15.74″N 3°9′50.29″W

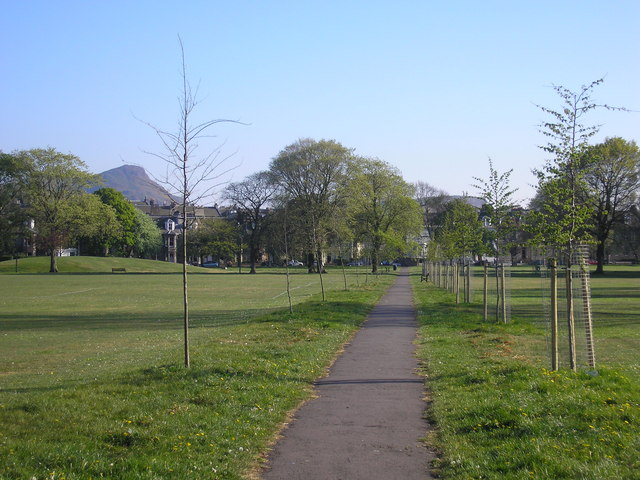
Leith Links looking south towards Arthur's Seat

Leith Links is the principal open space within Leith, the docks district of Edinburgh, Scotland. This public park is divided by a road into two main areas, a western section and an eastern section, both being largely flat expanses of grass bordered by mature trees. Historically it covered a wider area extending north as far as the shoreline of the Firth of Forth. This area of grass and former sand-dunes was previously used as a golf links.

== Current uses ==
The west section of the park contains children's play areas, football pitches and, in the north-west corner, and tennis and petanque courts. There are also three disused bowling greens due to be redeveloped into a new activity centre and community space.

In the east section an informal cricket pitch has existed since 1826. It is used by Leith Franklin Academicals Beige cricket club which, taking its name from Benjamin Franklin, was established in 1852 as the Leith Franklin cricket club. The club has a clubhouse outside, but adjacent to, the park next to the Seafield Bowling Club's enclosed lawn bowls bowling green (from 1883) and clubhouse also outwith the park.

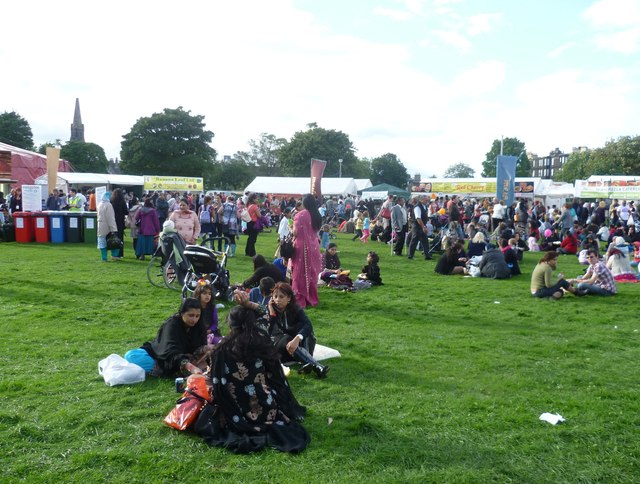
Edinburgh Mela in 2012

In the first week of June, Leith Festival Gala Day is held here. The Edinburgh Mela (since 2010) is held on the Links in late August

== Previous uses ==
Historically the park contained a Victorian bandstand, a pond for model yachts, and was used for annual events such as pageants. Leith Races were held on Leith Sands at the edge of the original links.

== History ==
During the Scottish Reformation, on 25 July 1559, the Protestant Lords of the Congregation made a truce with the Catholic Queen Regent, Mary of Guise, at the Links, who agreed to vacate Holyroodhouse and leave Edinburgh.

During the Siege of Leith in 1560, English and Scottish troops made use of the area to create siege trenches. Two mounds on Leith Links, known as "Giant's Brae" and "Lady Fyfe's Brae", identified on later maps as "Somerset's Battery" and "Pelham's Battery" respectively, are scheduled monuments as artillery mounds created for the siege in April 1560. However, a contemporary map at Petworth shows that Pelham's Battery was built on the slope to the south of Leith Links and Somerset's battery was located adjacent to the present Pilrig House. The tradition that these two batteries were on the Links goes no further back than Campbell's "History of Leith" published in 1827. Lent authority by the Ordnance Survey 1852, the identification saved the mounds in 1888 when several other hillocks were removed during landscaping.

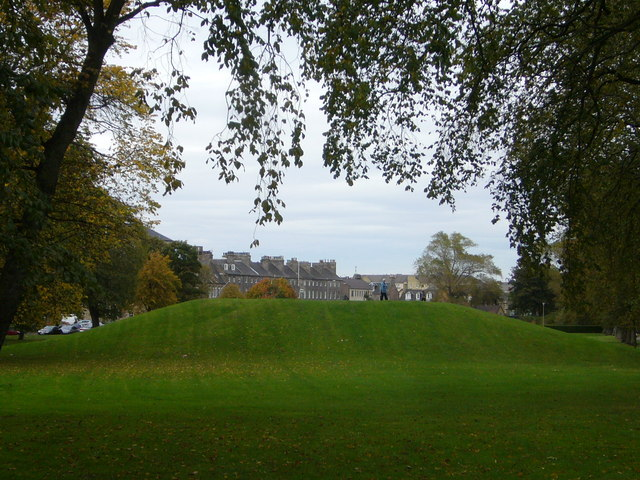
The earthwork known as "Giant's Brae", on Leith Links

Bishop Couper was playing golf on Leith Links in 1619 when he had a vision. Charles I of England was playing golf on Leith Links in 1642 when he received news of the Irish rebellion. Games were frequently the subject of betting and Captain John Porteous bet 20 guineas in a match against Alexander Elphinstone (d.1732), brother of Lord Balmerino in 1724.

The same Alexander Elphinstone, who had riches but no employment, appears in a more dramatic event on 23 December 1729 when he challenged Lt Swift of Lord Cardigan's Regiment to a duel (with swords) on Leith Links. Elphinstone mortally wounded Swift.

Leith Links is famous in the history of golf. Records show a 5-hole golf course which was typically played round twice. It had been played for a long time up until shortly before 1824, and was revived again in 1864. Both Charles I and the future James VII and II were said to have played golf on the links while they were in residence at Holyrood Palace. The clubhouse was on the site of the former Leith Academy building on Duke Street, on the south-west corner of the Links. A commemorative cairn and plaque marks this connection at the western side of the park. The rules of golf developed in Leith were adopted by the Royal and Ancient Company of Golfers on their move to St. Andrews in 1777.

It is believed the first international golf contest took place at the links, when the Duke of Albany played two English courtiers for national claim to the game of golf. The game resulted in the construction of Golfers Land on the Royal Mile by the Duke's partner, the Edinburgh cobbler John Paterson.

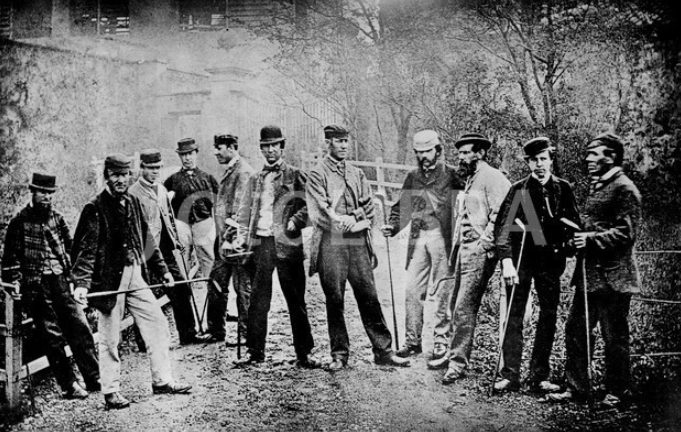
Golfers at Leith Links in 1867 (left to right) Andrew Strath, Davie Park, Bob Kirk, Jamie Anderson, Jamie Dunn, Willie Dow, Willie Dunn, Sr., A. Greig, Old Tom Morris, Young Tom Morris, and George Morris.

The entire area was only formalised as a public park (as opposed to a public open space) in 1888 as part of the Leith Improvement Plan. At this time the area was levelled (other than the two surmised gun batteries) and planted with trees along its perimeter and several paths dividing the area. Cast iron railings enclosing the entire area were erected but these were removed during World War II as part of the war effort. Following the creation of the park, golf was discouraged, but was not officially banned here until 1905.

As part of the remodelling in 1888 various discoveries were made: foremost of these were two burial areas at either end of the Links. That to the extreme west, in the triangle of land isolated by Wellington Place, was surmised to be burial pits from an outbreak of the plague which affected Leith in the middle of the 17th century.

== Plague of 1645 ==
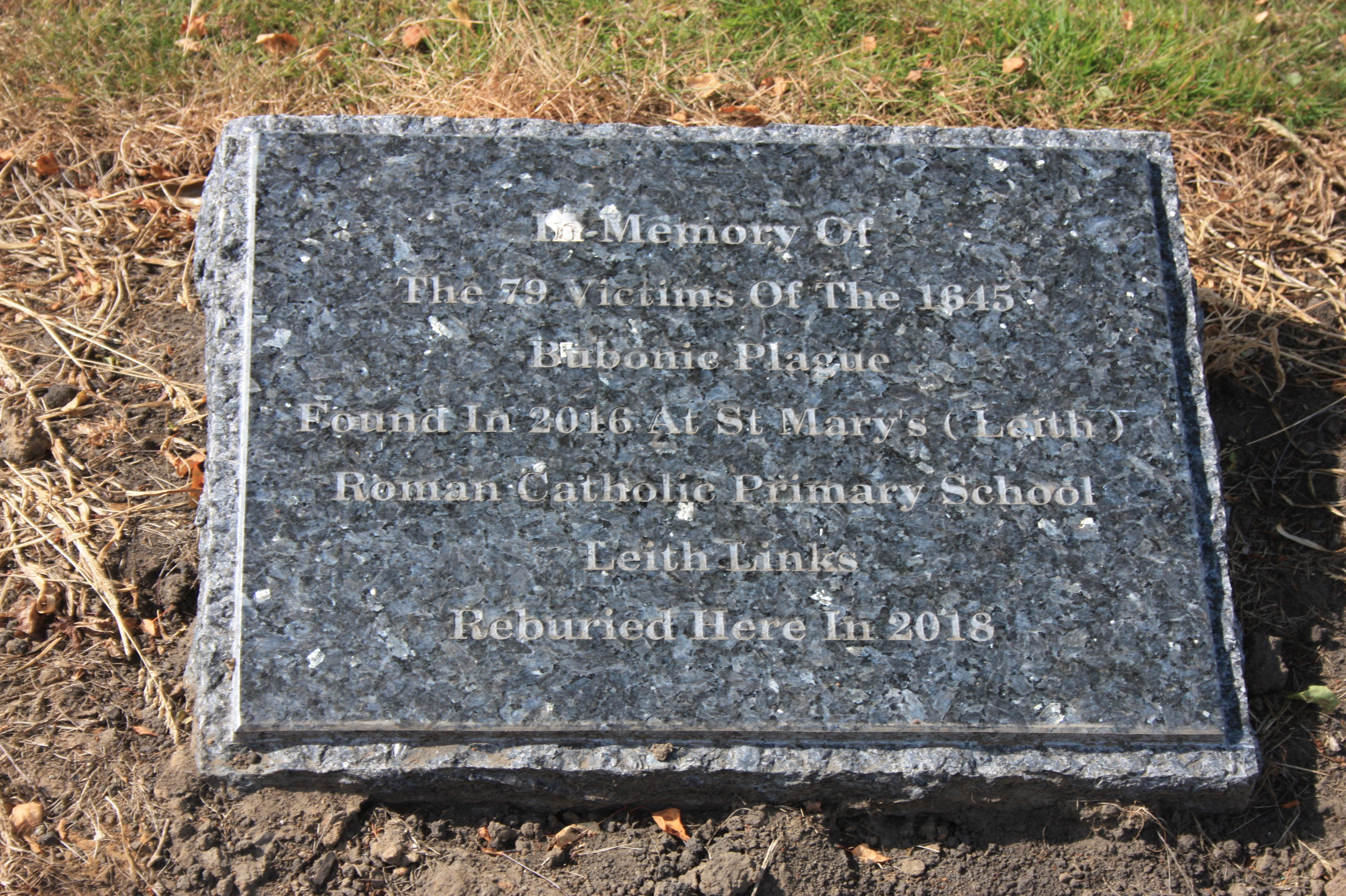
Memorial plaque to 79 plague victims removed from Leith Links in 2017 and buried in Rosebank Cemetery in 2018

The plague which struck Leith in 1645 was only one of many periodic outbreaks of plague that occurred in Edinburgh and Leith between the 14th and 17th centuries. The historian Christopher Smout believes that the 1645 epidemic, which occurred at a time when warring armies were on the march, probably resulted from the spread of typhus. It may have been carried north by Scottish soldiers present at the Siege of Newcastle where plague was reported after the town's surrender to General Leslie on 19 October 1644.

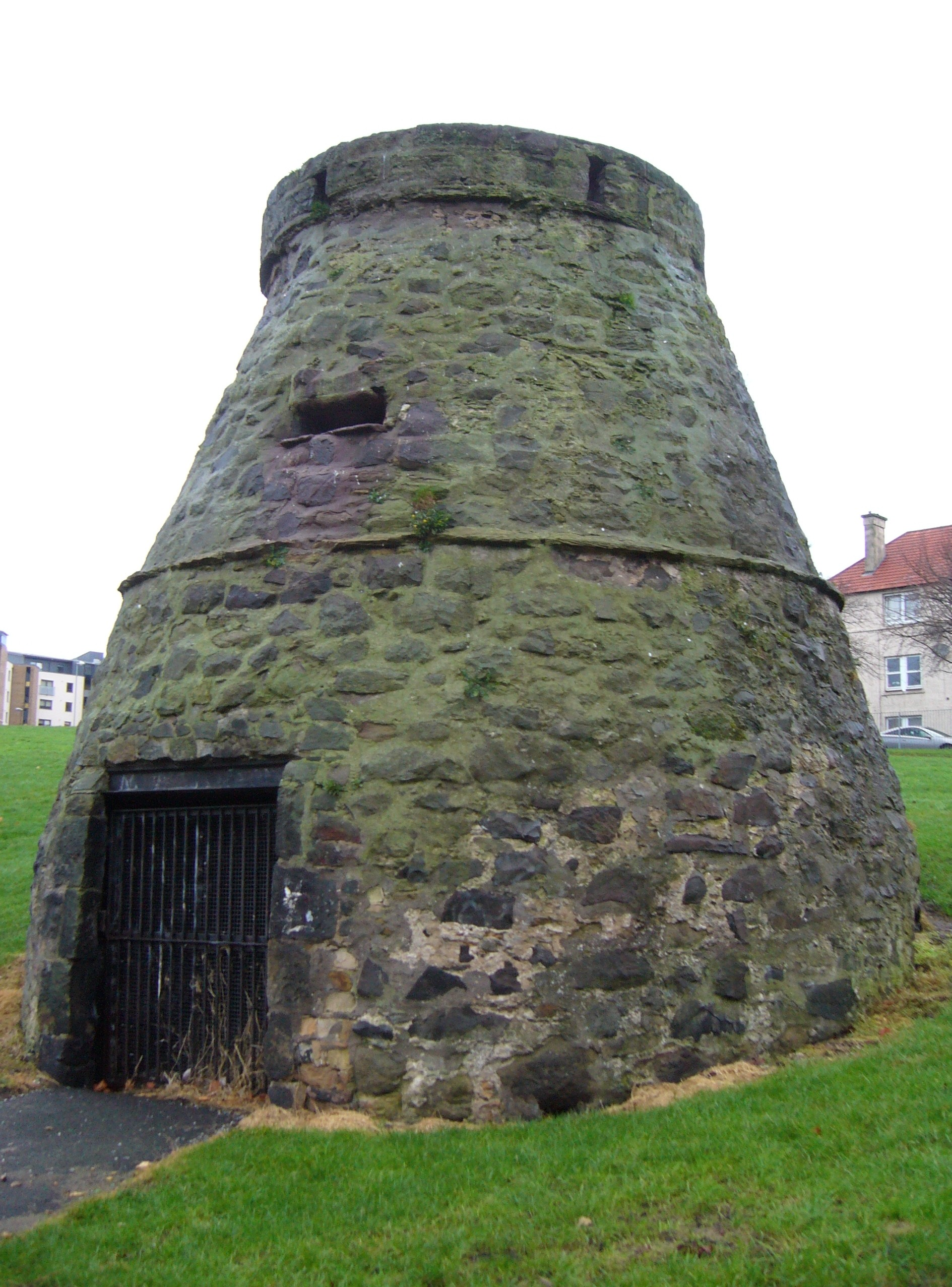
Lochend Doocot, believed to have been used as a plague kiln

The records of South Leith Parish Church reveal that the first cases of "the pest" appeared in Yardheads in April 1645 and that the outbreak reached its height that summer. David Alderstone, member of the Kirk Session and the town's Water Bailie, left a unique, detailed record of the epidemic. The town was divided into quarters, each under the supervision of a quartermaster charged with ascertaining the number of infected in each quarter and supplying them with food. As a quarantine measure the infected were removed to huts on the Links, divided into quarters corresponding to those in the town and similarly placed under quartermasters. An overseer appointed to co-ordinate their activities reported initially that "he cannot gait up ane list of the names and ludges in the Linkes becaus none will go with him", but by 17 July he had succeeded in handing in "a paper book of paper wrytin on both sides...divyding the Ludges, who buildit thm, to qm [whom] thei appertaine, how many people were in everie Ludge". However, he seems to have fallen victim to the plague because an entry for 20 July names someone else as overseer.

An entry for 17 July, when it was "ordained to provyd some wemen to help to fill ye cairts [of muck and refuse]" suggests there was a shortage of able-bodied men for cleansing the town. The women were drawn mainly from the infected, although female prisoners were also put to work. The bailies and quartermasters visited the huts daily, distributing to each person three half-loaves of bread, a Scotch pint of ale and any other necessities. A special storehouse manned by two storekeepers was built to accommodate the provisions. The huts were cleaned by "foul clengeris" who wore a distinctive uniform described as "ane joupe [coat] of blak with a St. Andrew's Cross of quhyte clayth sewit about with the sam for designing and knawing of thame be utheris". Clothing was disinfected by boiling in large iron cauldrons. Clothing that could not be so treated was burned, or placed in kilns to subject it to the smoke and heat of burning heather and whins. One such kiln in the form of a converted castle doocot still stands at Lochend, about a mile south of the Links. Apart from a few exceptions in South Leith Kirkyard, the dead were buried on the Links, wrapped in the coarse blankets in which they had lain. After the outbreak had abated Aldinstone, a fortunate survivor, reported to the Session on 3 February 1646 that the number of fatalities for South Leith amounted to 2,421 (out of an estimated population in excess of 4,000), for Restalrig 160 and Craigend (i.e. Calton) 155, making a total of 2,736 for the whole parish. No records have survived in respect of the smaller parish of North Leith.

During works in the playground of St Mary's RC Primary School (on the north edge of Leith Links) the remains of 79 bodies were found, thought to be victims of the plague. They were interred in Rosebank Cemetery in 2018 and marked with a memorial plaque.

== Surrounding development ==
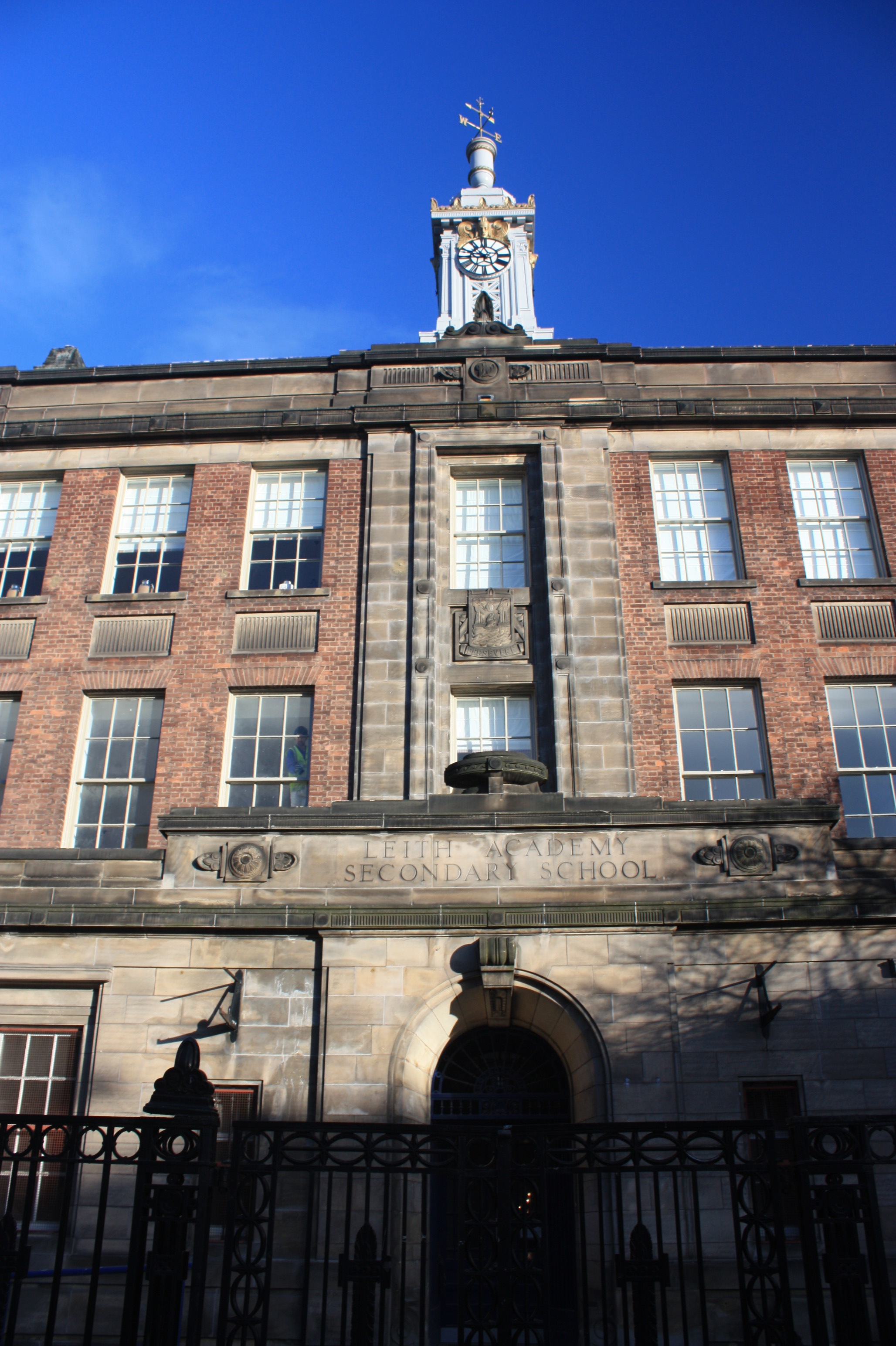
Former Leith Academy building by Reid and Forbes

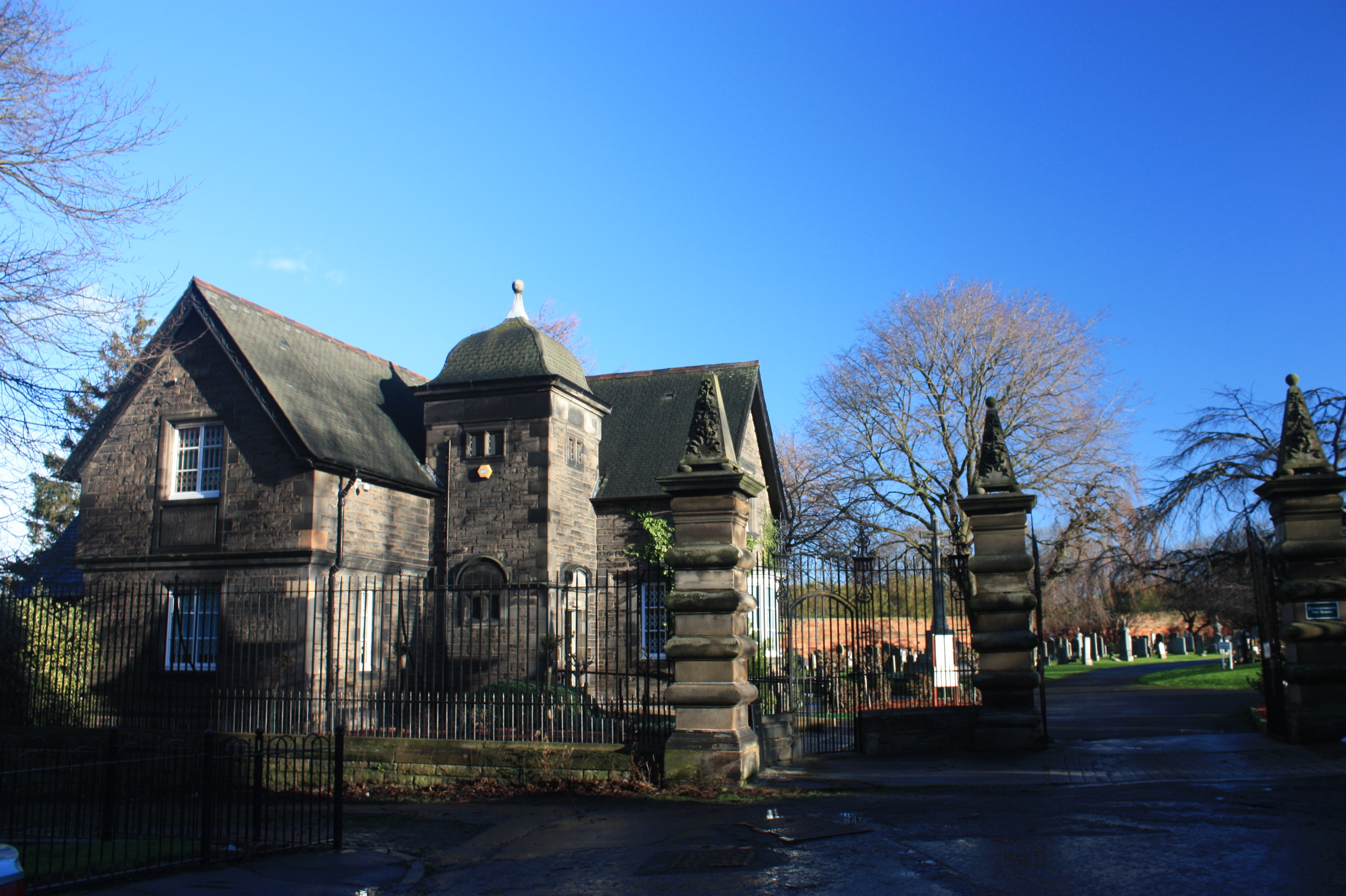
The entrance to Seafield Cemetery, Leith Links

Leith Links originally lay wholly to the east of medieval Leith. Only from 1770 onwards did local law permit building outwith the old town wall. The first development was on the extreme north-west corner (now Queen Charlotte Street) where three roughly identical villas were constructed around 1775. From then various edges of the Links were gradually developed, those to the south-east being largely from the early 19th century and particularly grand. These houses, as well as both the eastern and western sections of the Links, feature prominently in the Leith-based political crime novel - Kertamen by Mauro Martone. The majority of buildings facing the Links are the first building on their site and most date from the 19th century. A group of colony houses are located to the south of the Links.

Allotment gardens were created on the north-east edge during World War II and still remain. The industrial hinterland here originally held ropeworks and cooperages but for most of the 20th century operated as a bottling plant for United Distillers until they vacated the site around 2005.

Seafield Cemetery was developed at the extreme east end of Leith Links in 1887. Seafield Crematorium stands at the far east side of the cemetery, with a separate access from Seafield Road. It opened in 1939.

The west side of the Links is dominated by the two large school buildings: Leith Primary and the former Leith Academy building by Reid and Forbes (now converted to housing).

== Monuments ==
- Statue of John Rattray playing golf - on north edge
- Memorial cairn to the founding of golf on the site - on west edge
- Memorials plaques on Giant's Brae and Lady Fyfe's Brae explaining their military significance.

== Botanical ==
Leith Links is noteworthy for its high concentration of mature elms, despite losses to Dutch elm disease. Of some 270 mature trees in the park in 2013, just under half were elms. Most are wych elm, though there are also examples of Huntingdon Elm, of the variable field elm, of exotic species like European White Elm and Japanese Elm, and of rare cultivars. At the east end of Claremont Park there is a (now rare) mature English elm. Losses to disease have to some extent been made good by planting of disease-resistant elm-cultivars such as Ulmus 'Regal'. Elms were originally preferred for planting because of their tolerance of salty sea-winds.

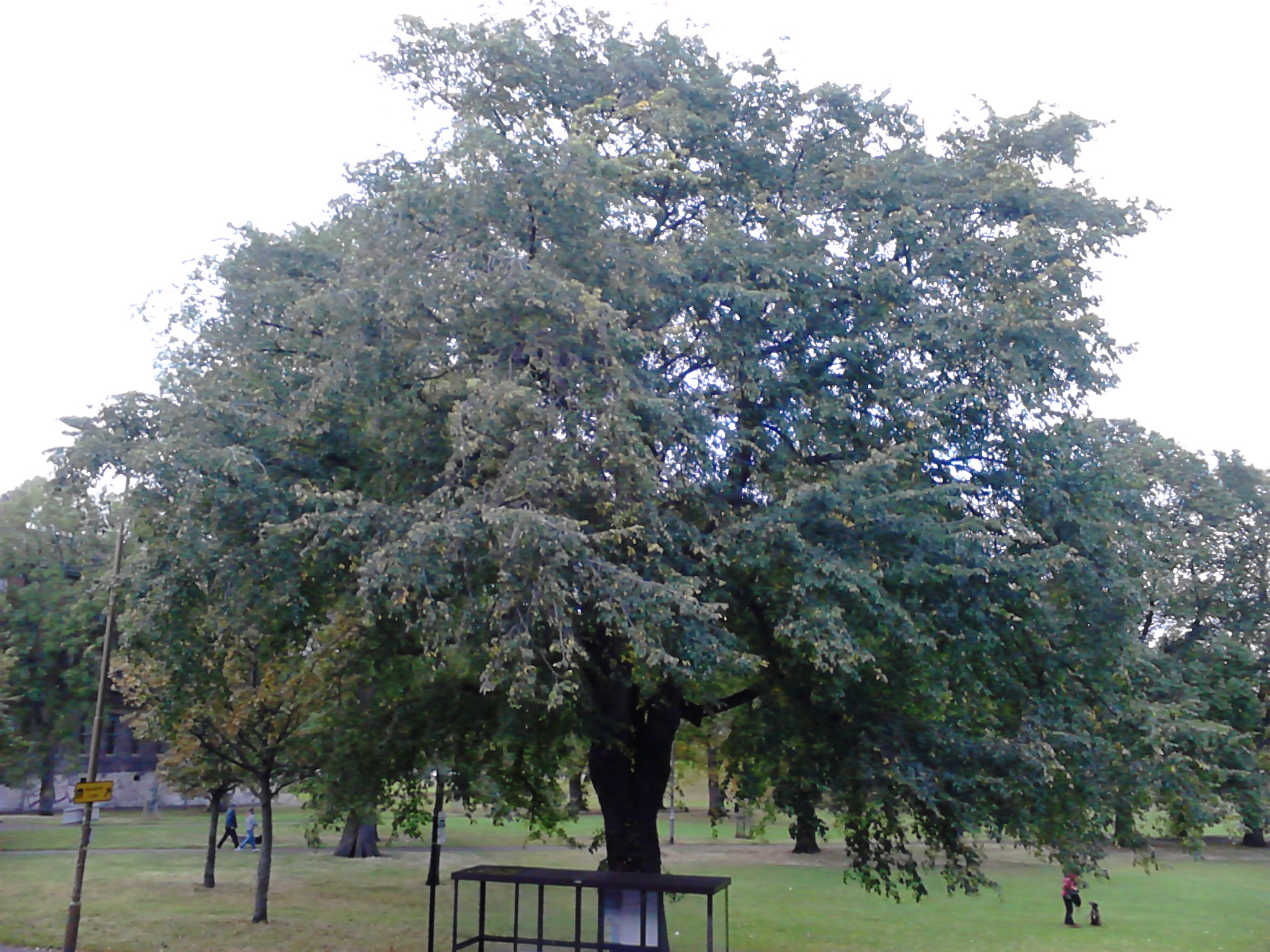
Ulmus × hollandica 'Viminalis', Vanburgh Place, Leith Links, 2016

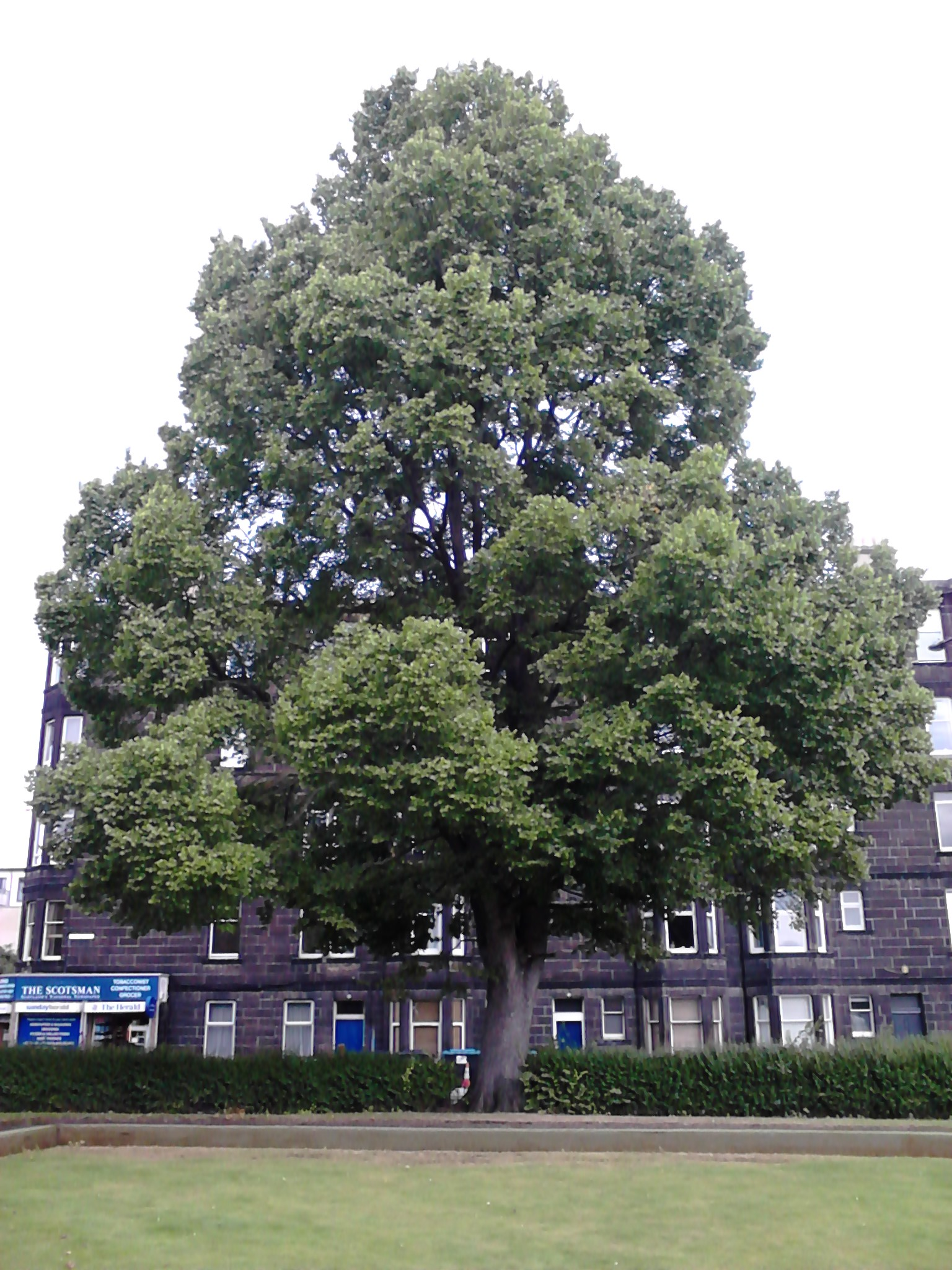
Ulmus minor 'Rueppellii', Links Place, Leith Links, 2016

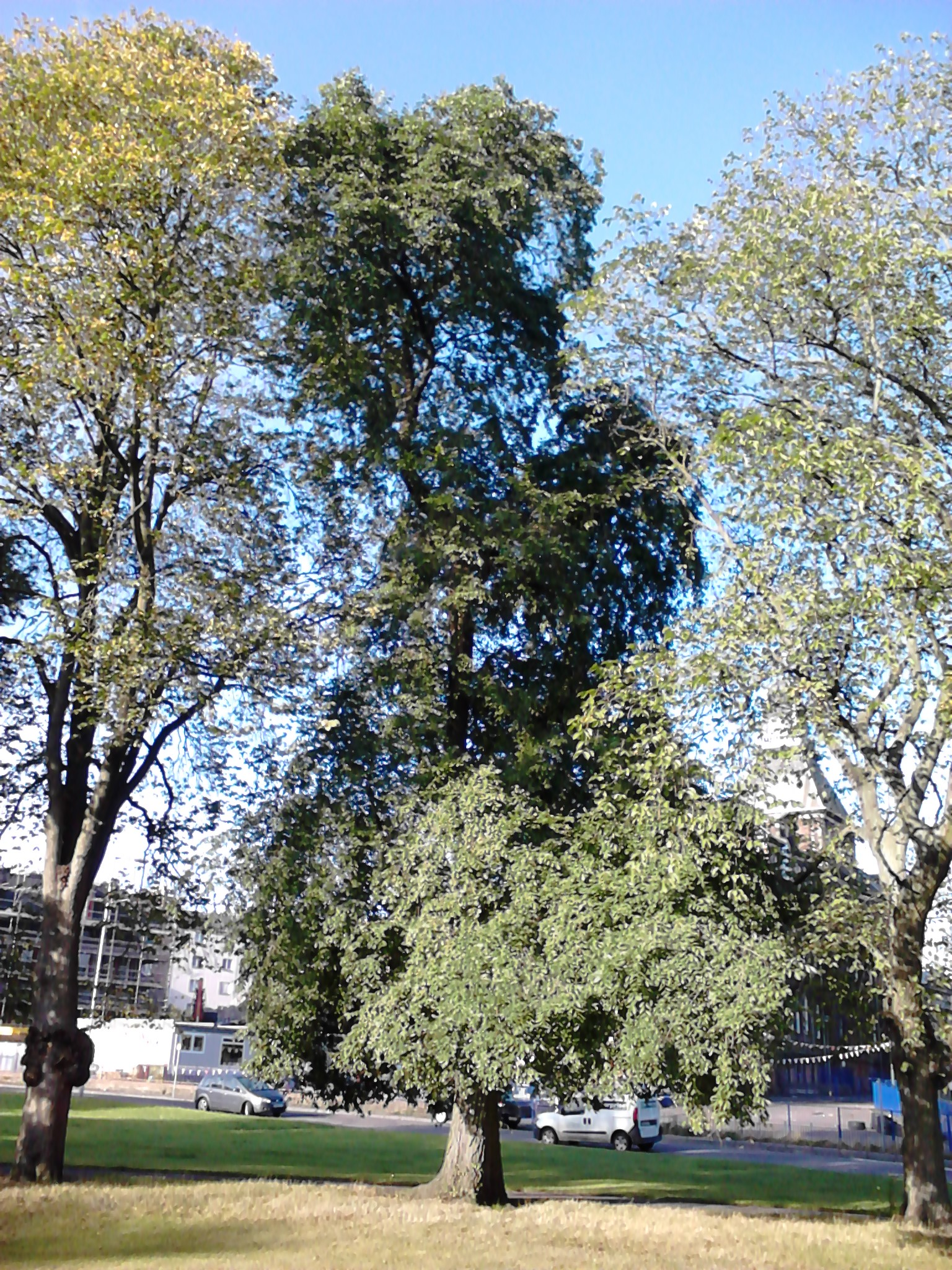
Convex-leaved field elm cultivar, Duncan Place, Leith Links, 2016

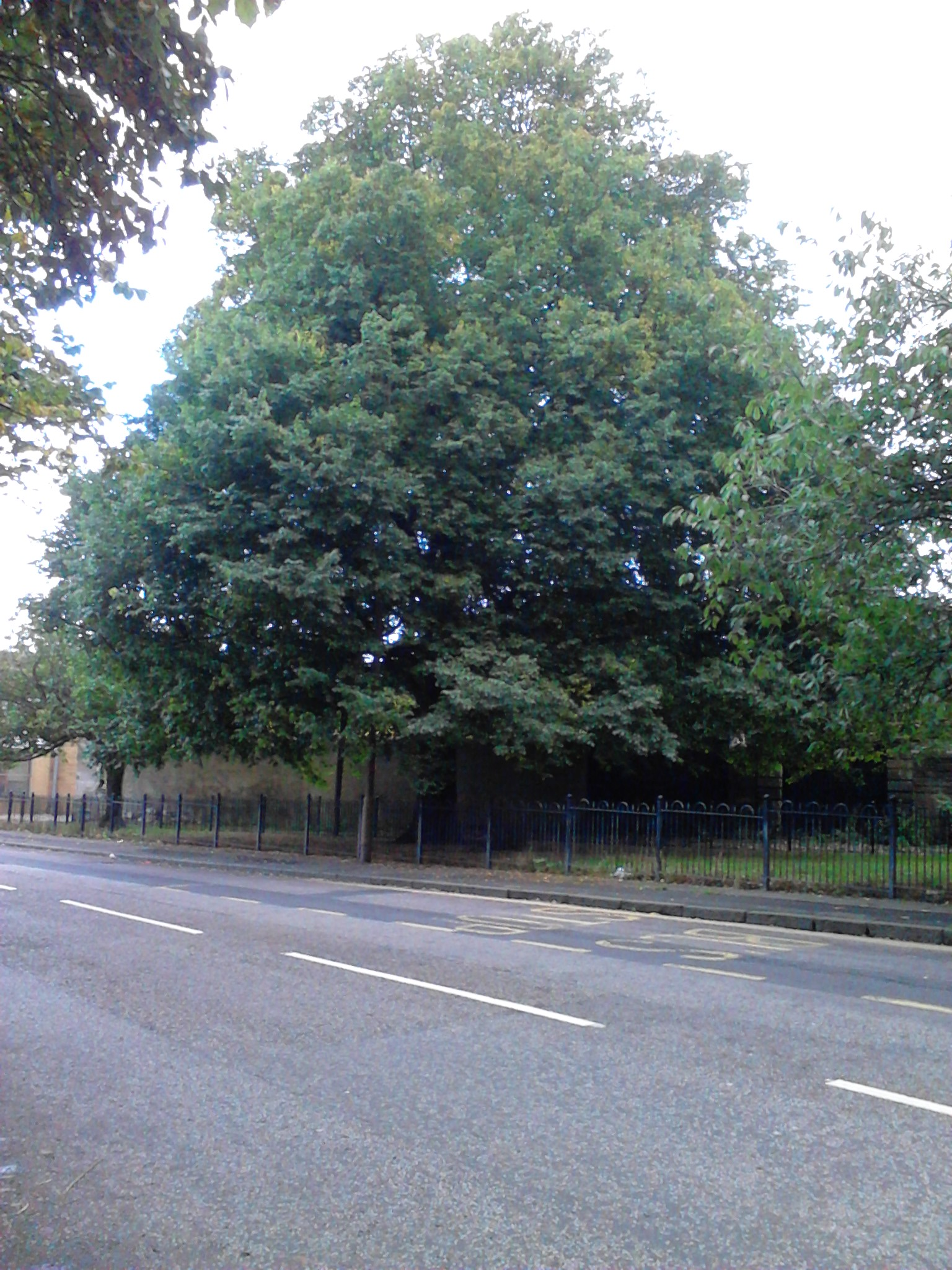
Ulmus × hollandica 'Dauvessei', Claremont Park, Leith Links, 2016

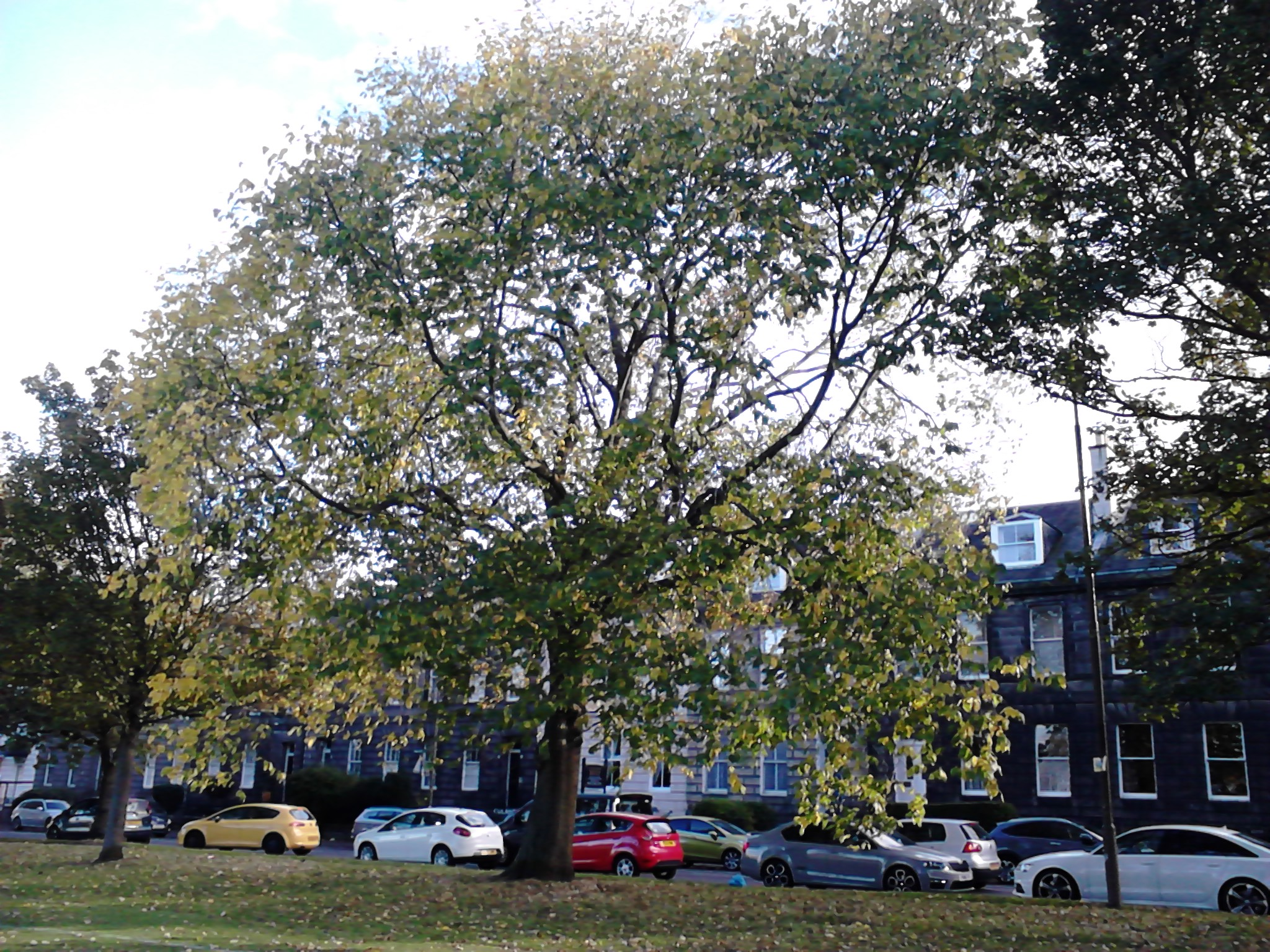
Blandford Elm, Hermitage Place, Leith Links, 2016

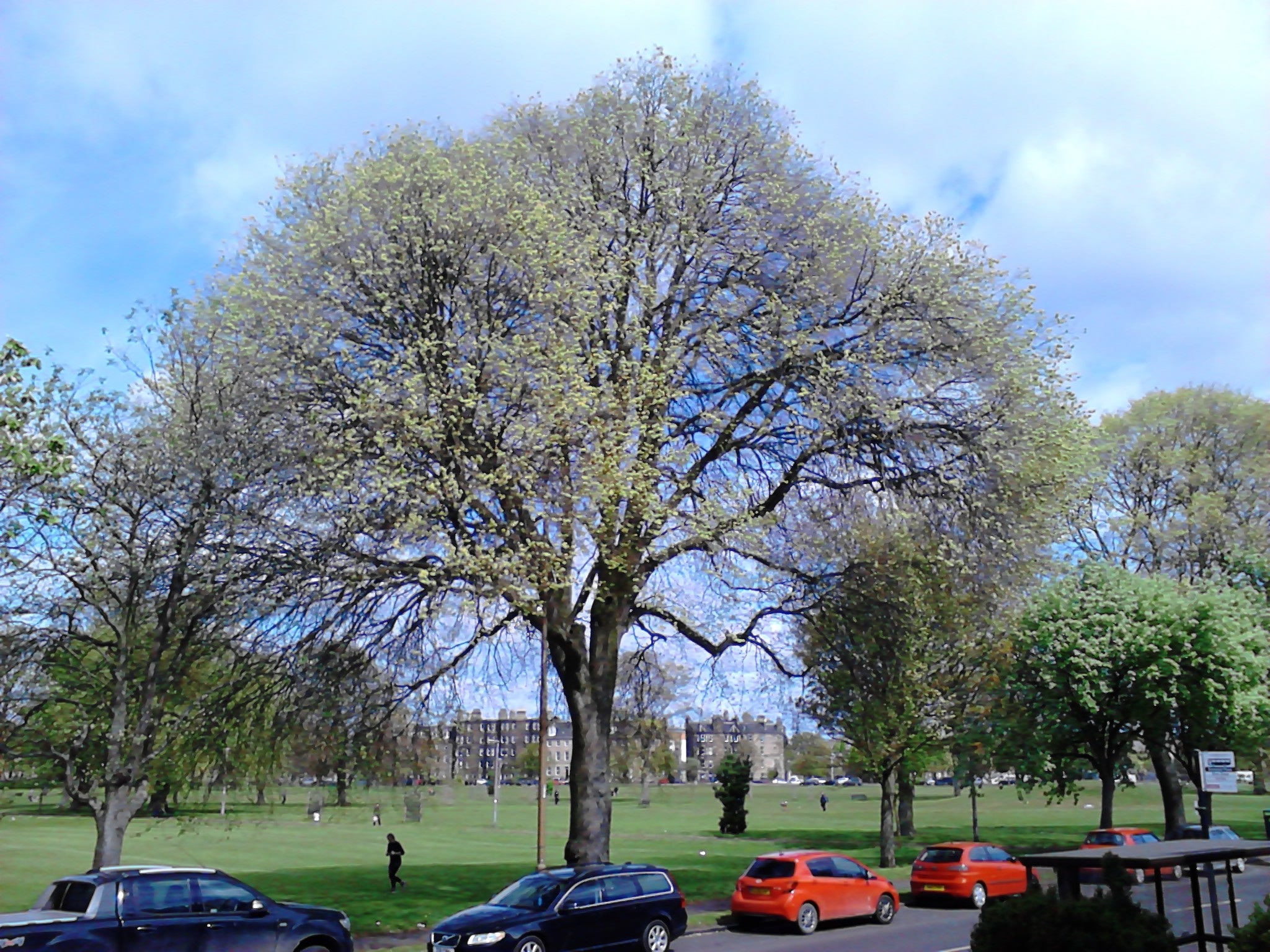
Dutch elm cultivar, Hermitage Place, Leith Links, 2016

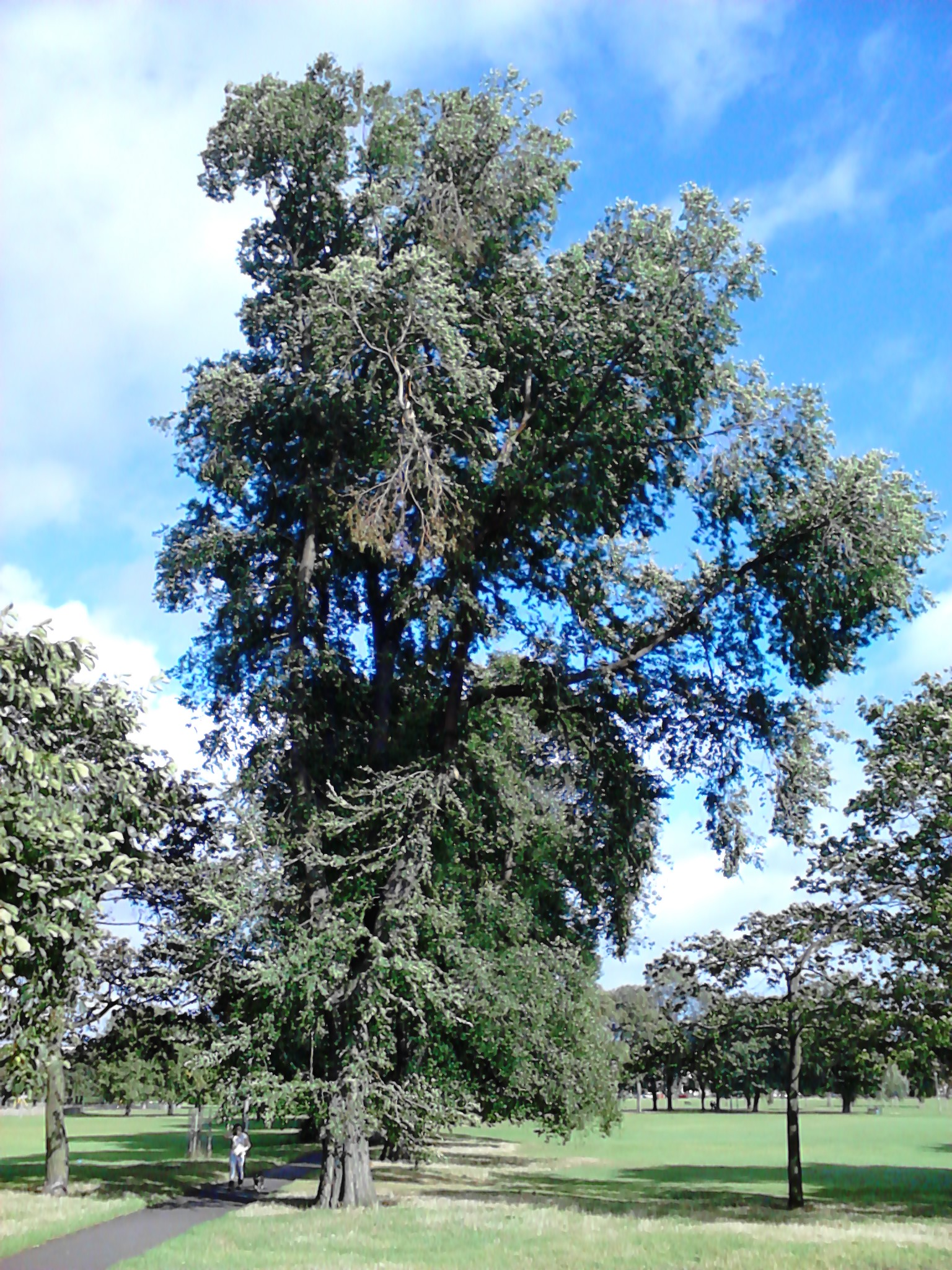
Unidentified elm, south corner of Leith Links, 2016

== Transport ==
The perimeter of the park is serviced by Lothian Buses with stops on Vanburgh Place, Hermitage Place, East Hermitage Place, Links Place and Seafield Place.

The nearest tram stop is Foot of the Walk.

== Bibliography ==
- Chambers, Robert (1996) [1824]. Traditions of Edinburgh. Edinburgh: Chambers. ISBN 0550735208.
