= Golfers Land =

Former tenement in Edinburgh, Scotland

Coordinates: 55.9522°N 3.1769°W

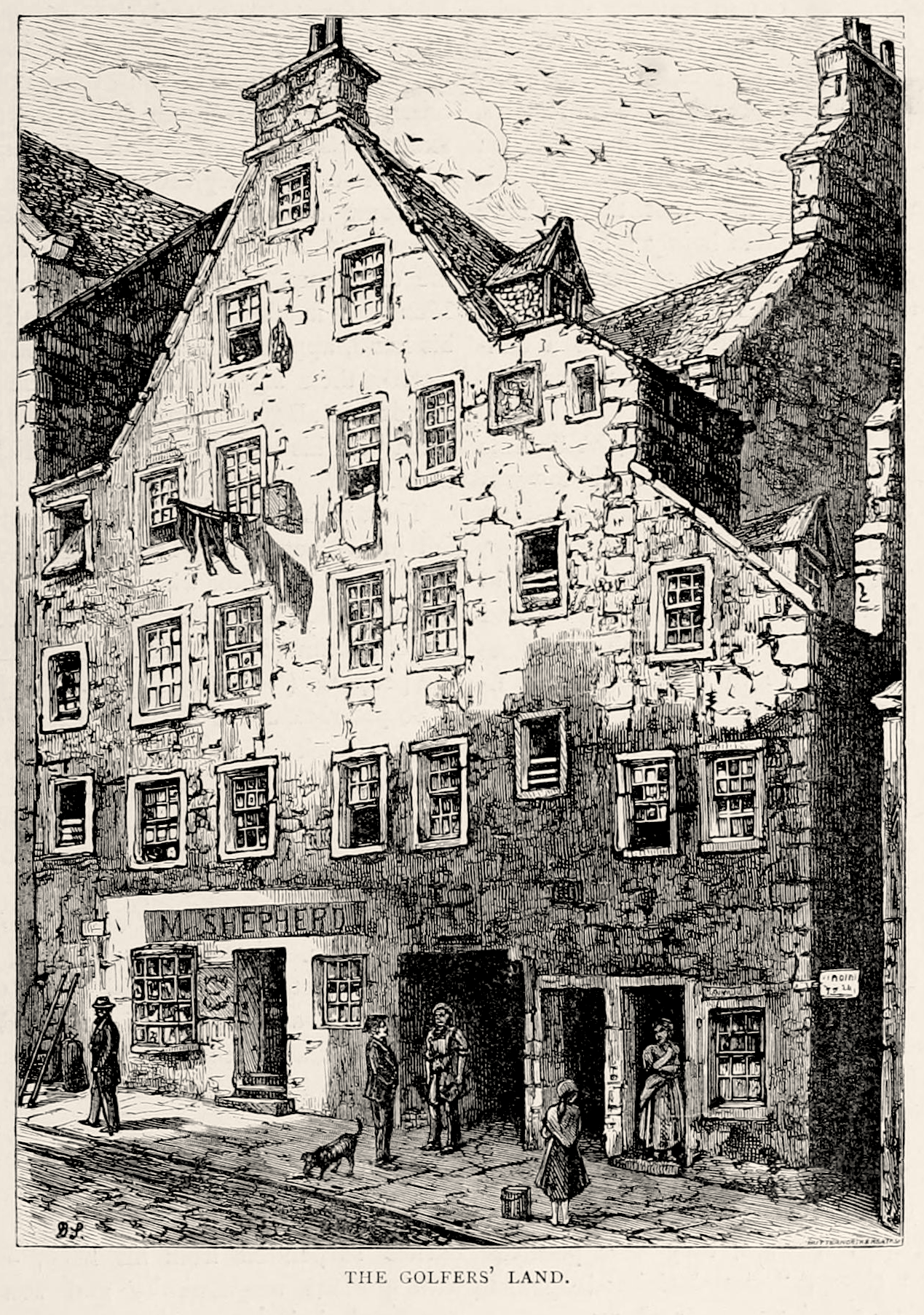
A Victorian engraving of Golfer's Land

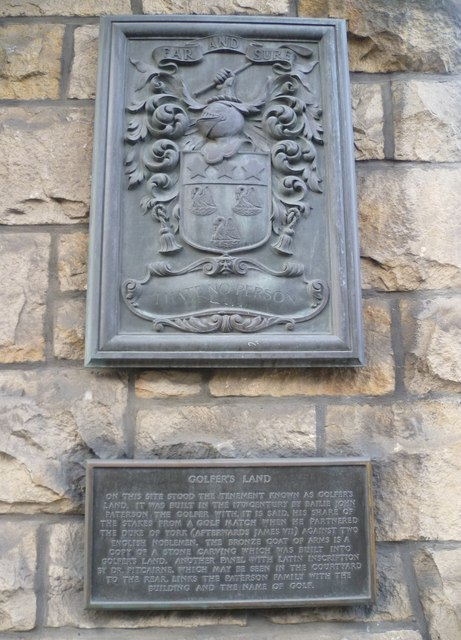
Plaques on the site of Golfer's Land

Golfers Land was a tenement on the Canongate in Edinburgh, Scotland, dating from around 1681. It got its name from its original owner, John Paterson, who is said to have been the teammate of the Duke of Albany in what is often regarded as the first international golf contest. The house has since been demolished and replaced with a new building, but a plaque on the wall continues to mark the site of Golfers Land.

== The first international golf contest ==
The contest is alleged to have arisen in 1681 when two of the Duke of Albany's English guests at Holyrood Palace claimed that the game of golf belonged to the English, not the Scottish. It is claimed that the two English nobles boasted they could beat the duke and any other Scotsman he could find to play alongside him. It was agreed that a game would be played at Leith Links, just outside Edinburgh. The prize was to be the national claim to the game of golf, and an undisclosed sum of money.

The duke called for John Paterson, a cobbler and amateur golfer, to be his teammate. Paterson had a reputation as being one of the finest golfers in the country, taking after his father and grandfather. Paterson and the duke were successful, and won the match. As the duke had an attendant to carry his clubs, some have cited this as the first recorded use of a caddie in golf.

== The house ==
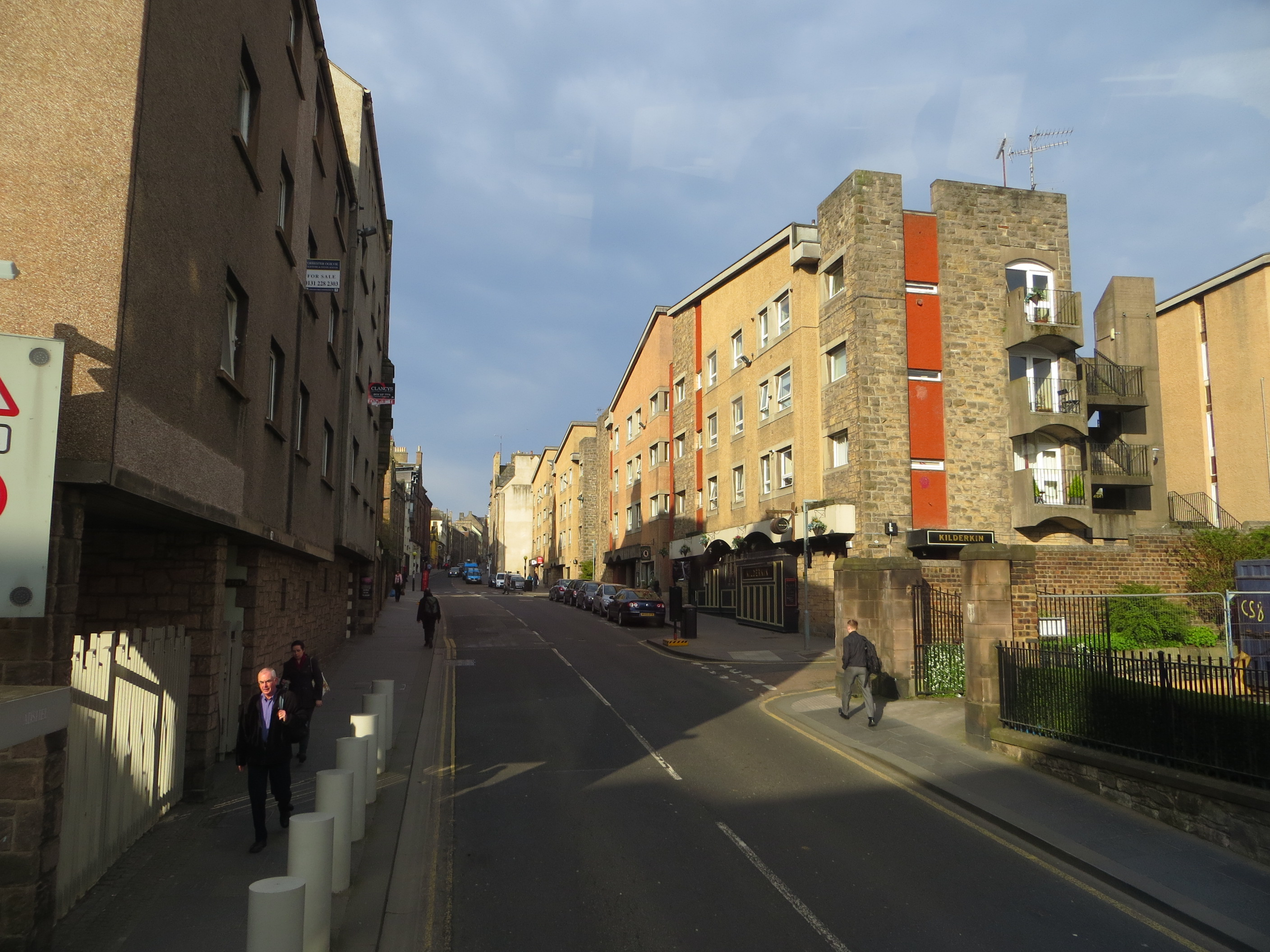
The site in 2014

The duke is said to have given the winnings to Paterson, who used the funds to buy the property at 79–81 Canongate on the Royal Mile, and to build a large mansion on it, so that he could be close to Holyrood Palace should he ever be called upon for his golfing services again. He named this site "Golfers Land". The property is recorded as having been five stories high, and was built over the entrance to Brown's Close.

The duke is also said to have awarded Paterson a coat of arms, a plaque of which was placed on the wall, and which remains on the site to this day. The arms showed three pelicans in their piety beneath a chief charged with three mullets, while the crest was a hand grasping a golf-club.

Despite being Category A-listed, the building was demolished in 1960.

== The site today ==
The site is currently occupied by a building built in the 1960s. The present occupants are the Kilderkin Pub. A plaque remains on the wall to mark the site, and to commemorate the golf game.
