= Ulmus minor 'Rueppellii' =

Elm cultivar

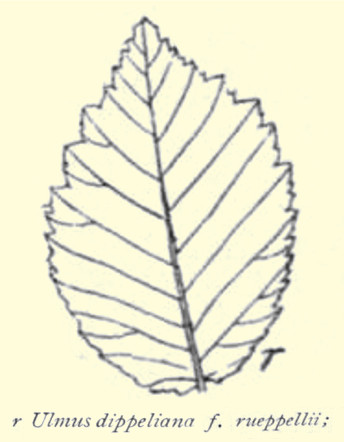
- Leaf-drawing of 'Rueppellii'
- Species: Ulmus minor
- Cultivar: 'Rueppellii'
- Origin: Europe

Ulmus minor 'Rueppellii' is a Field Elm cultivar said to have been introduced to Europe from Tashkent by the Späth nursery, Berlin. Noted in 1881 as a 'new elm', it was listed in Späth Catalogue 73, p. 124, 1888–89, and in subsequent catalogues, as Ulmus campestris Rueppelli, and later by Krüssmann as a cultivar.

== Description ==
'Rueppellii' was a pyramidal tree with a single stem and numerous ascending branches forming a globose or ovoid crown, much like 'Umbraculifera'. The branches are slightly corky, and the branchlets pubescent, bearing small leaves similar to those of the Cornish Elm, measuring 6–7 cm (2.4–2.8 in) long by 4–5 cm (1.6–2.0 in) wide, the surface likened to that of the wych elm U. glabra.

== Pests and diseases ==
Most U. minor cultivars are susceptible to Dutch elm disease, but, if not grafted, can survive through root-sucker regrowth. Specimens planted in Poland suffered from European elm scale.

== Cultivation ==
No specimens are known to survive. Three specimens supplied by the Späth nursery to the Royal Botanic Garden Edinburgh in 1902 as U. campestris 'Rueppelli' may survive in Edinburgh, as it was the practice of the Garden to distribute trees about the city (viz. the Wentworth Elm). The current list of Living Accessions held in the Garden per se does not list the plant. Two specimens were grown at Kew Gardens before the First World War, obtained from the Barbier nursery, France. A specimen obtained from Späth before 1914, and planted in that year, stood in the Ryston Hall arboretum, Norfolk, in the early 20th century. 'Rueppelli' was used in urban plantings in Bydgoszcz, Poland, in the 1920s. It was marketed by the Hesse Nursery of Weener, Germany, and by Dahs, Reuter & Co. of Cologne, in the 1930s.

In North America, one tree was planted as U. campestris 'Rueppelli' in 1897 at the Dominion Arboretum, Ottawa, Canada. In the US, Ulmus Rueppelli, 'Rueppell's English Elm' (an error probably arising from the equating of U. campestris with English Elm), a "handsome compact form, growing perfectly symmetrical without pruning", appeared in the 1902 catalogue of the Bobbink and Atkins nursery, Rutherford, New Jersey.

=== Putative specimens ===
In Edinburgh, an unidentified suckering Field Elm cultivar found in Links Place, Leith Links (2016), matches the description, leaf-drawing and herbarium specimen of 'Rueppellii', and may be one of Späth's three. Similar elms also appear in old photographs of Tashkent.

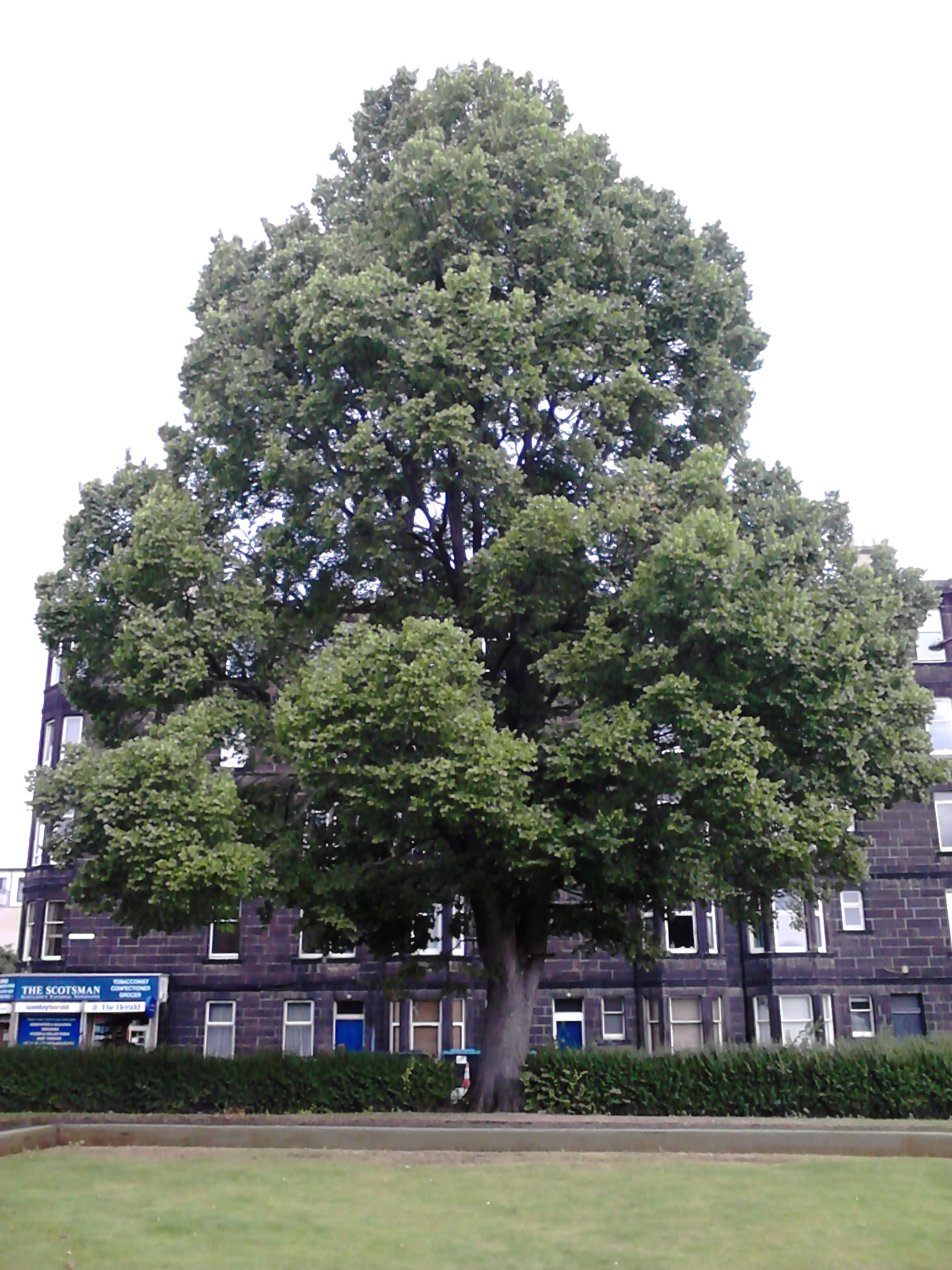
Links Place elm

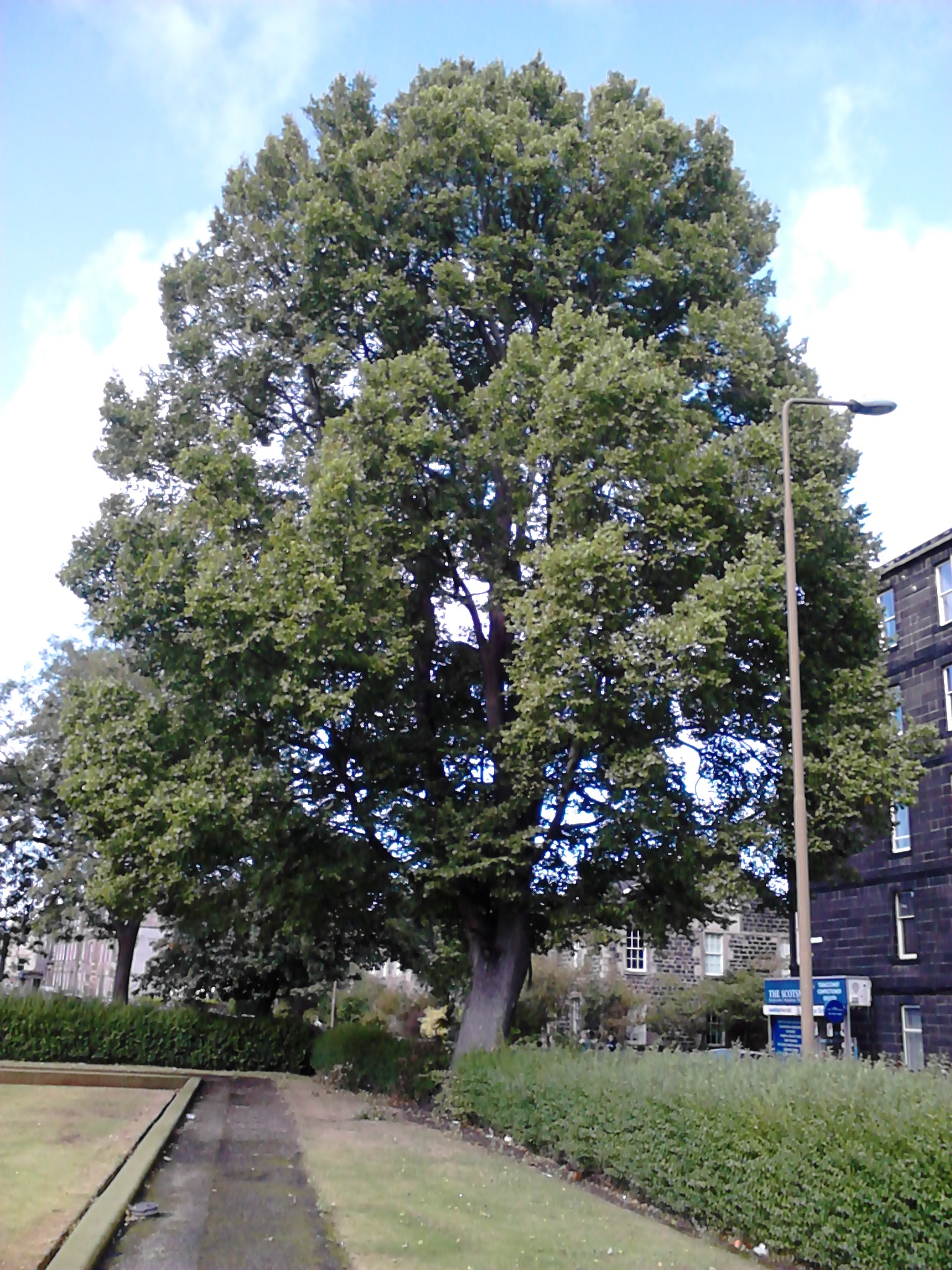
The same

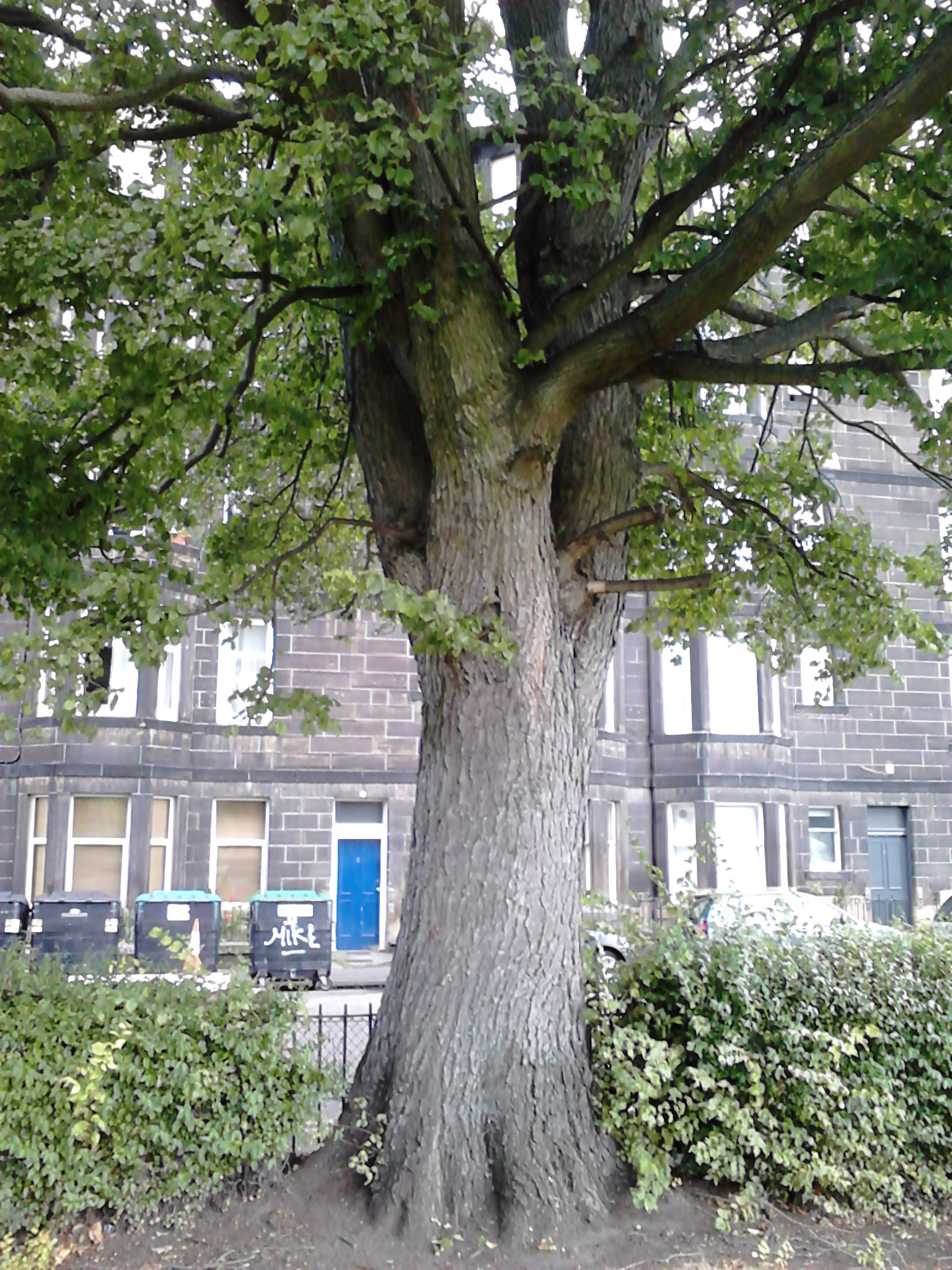
Bole of same

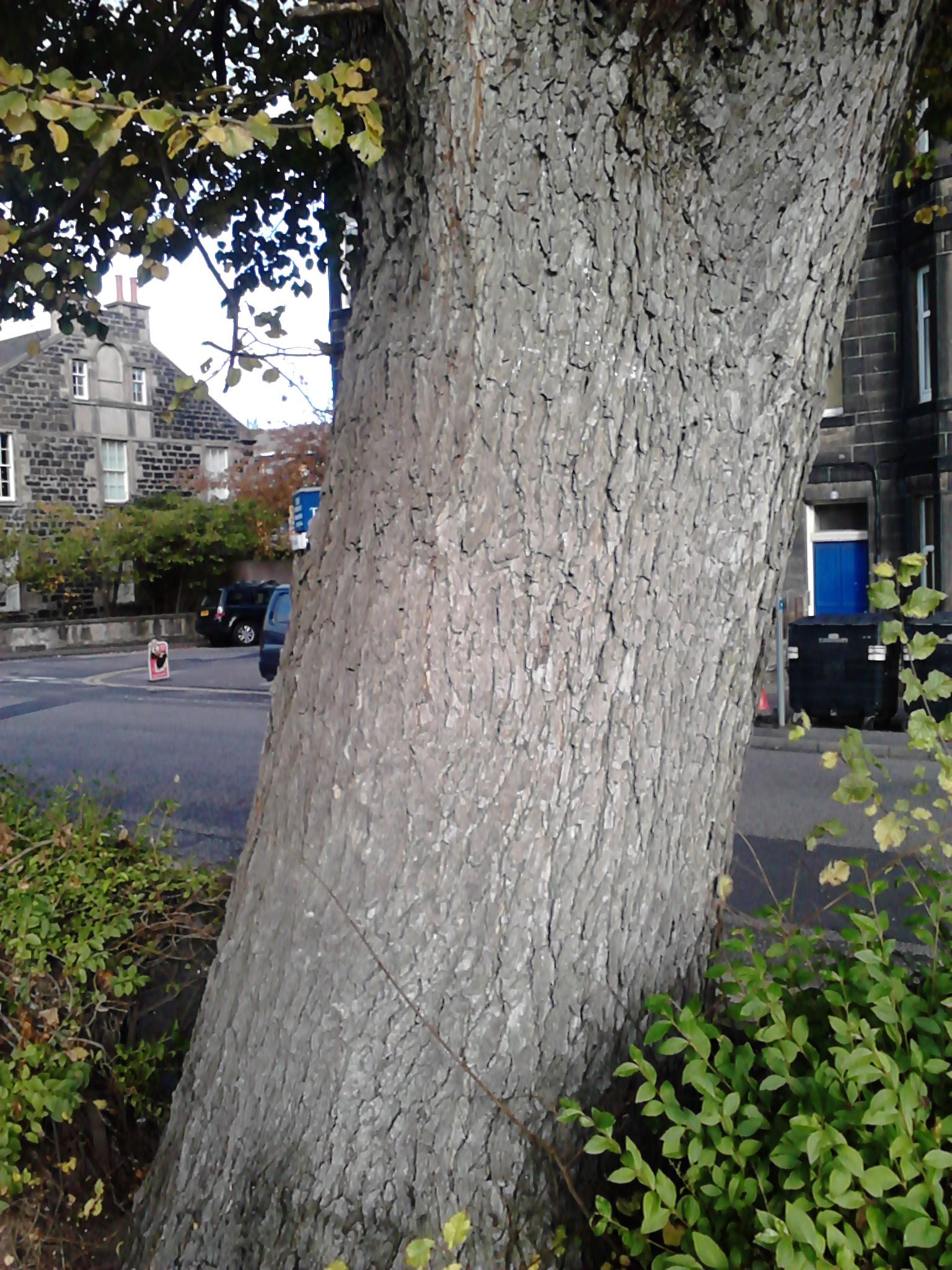
Bark of same

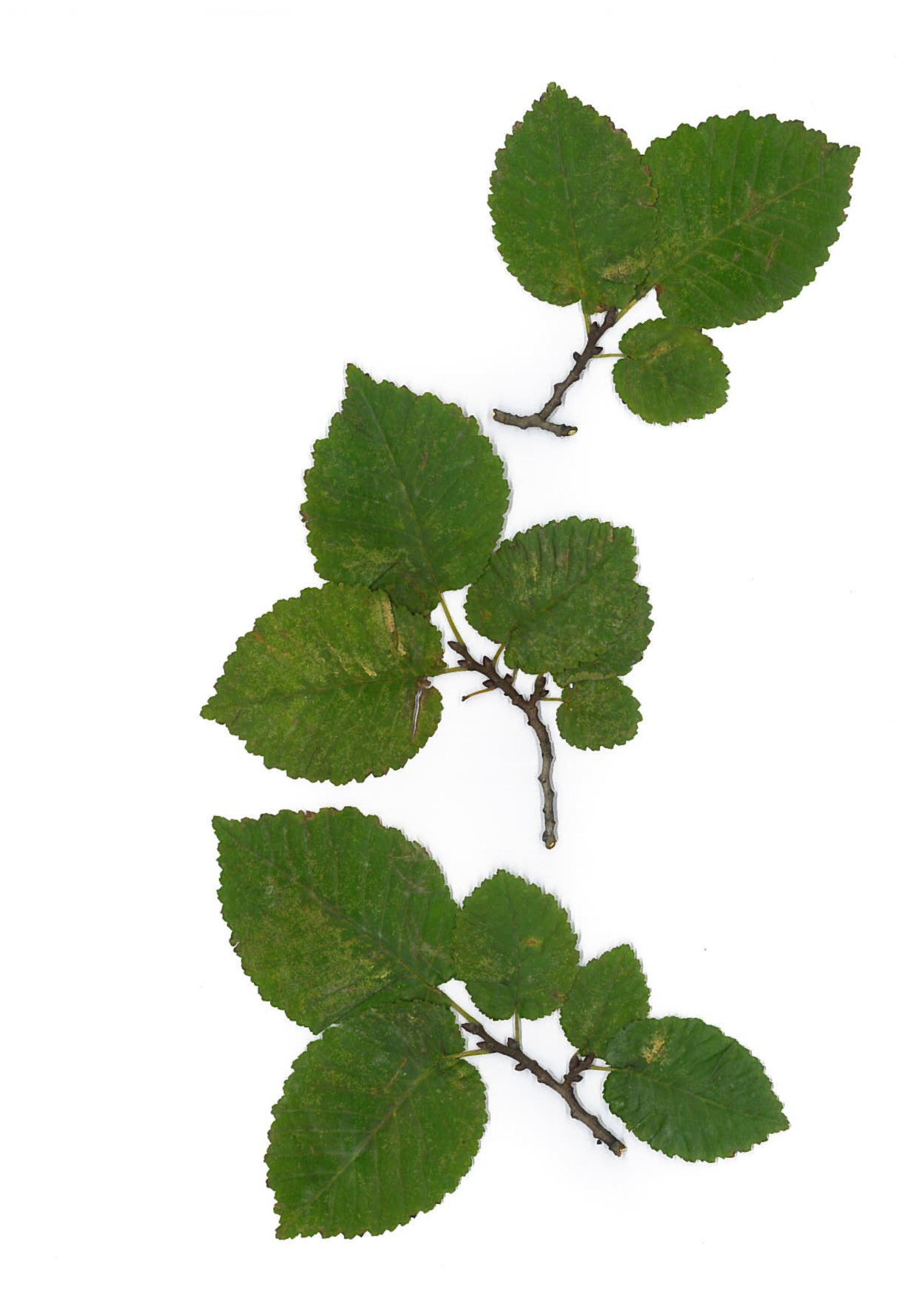
Leaves of same

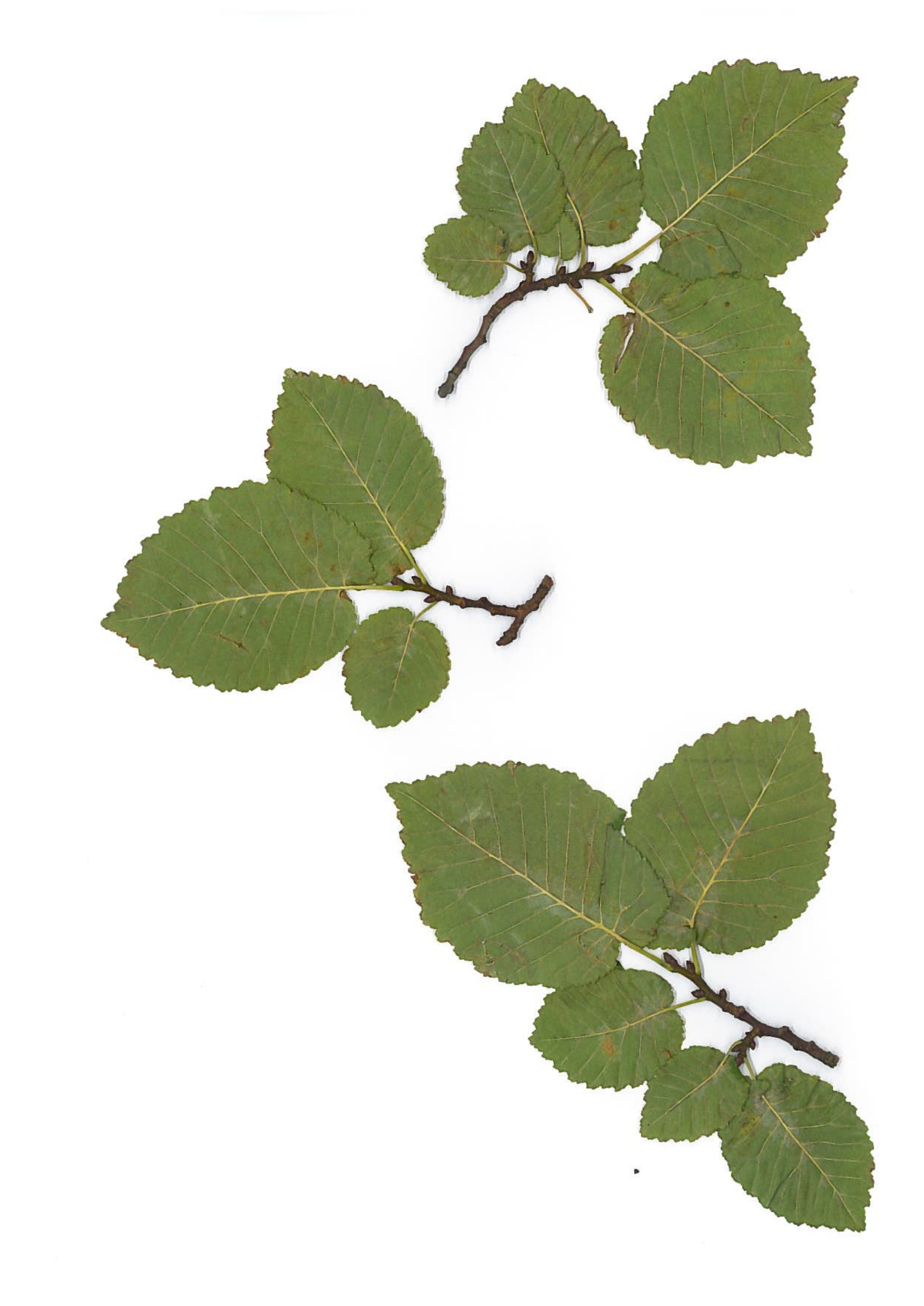
Underside

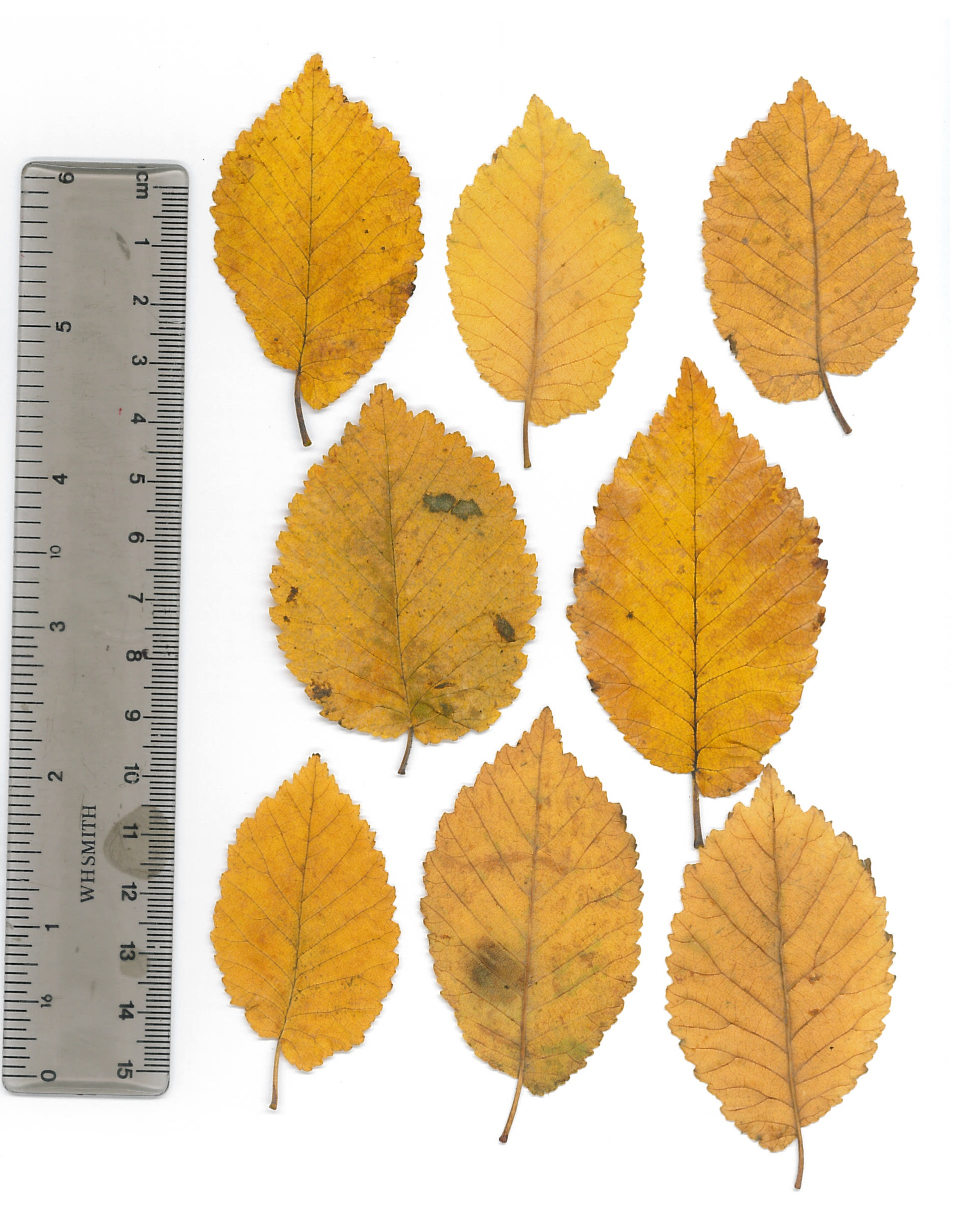
Pressed autumn leaves

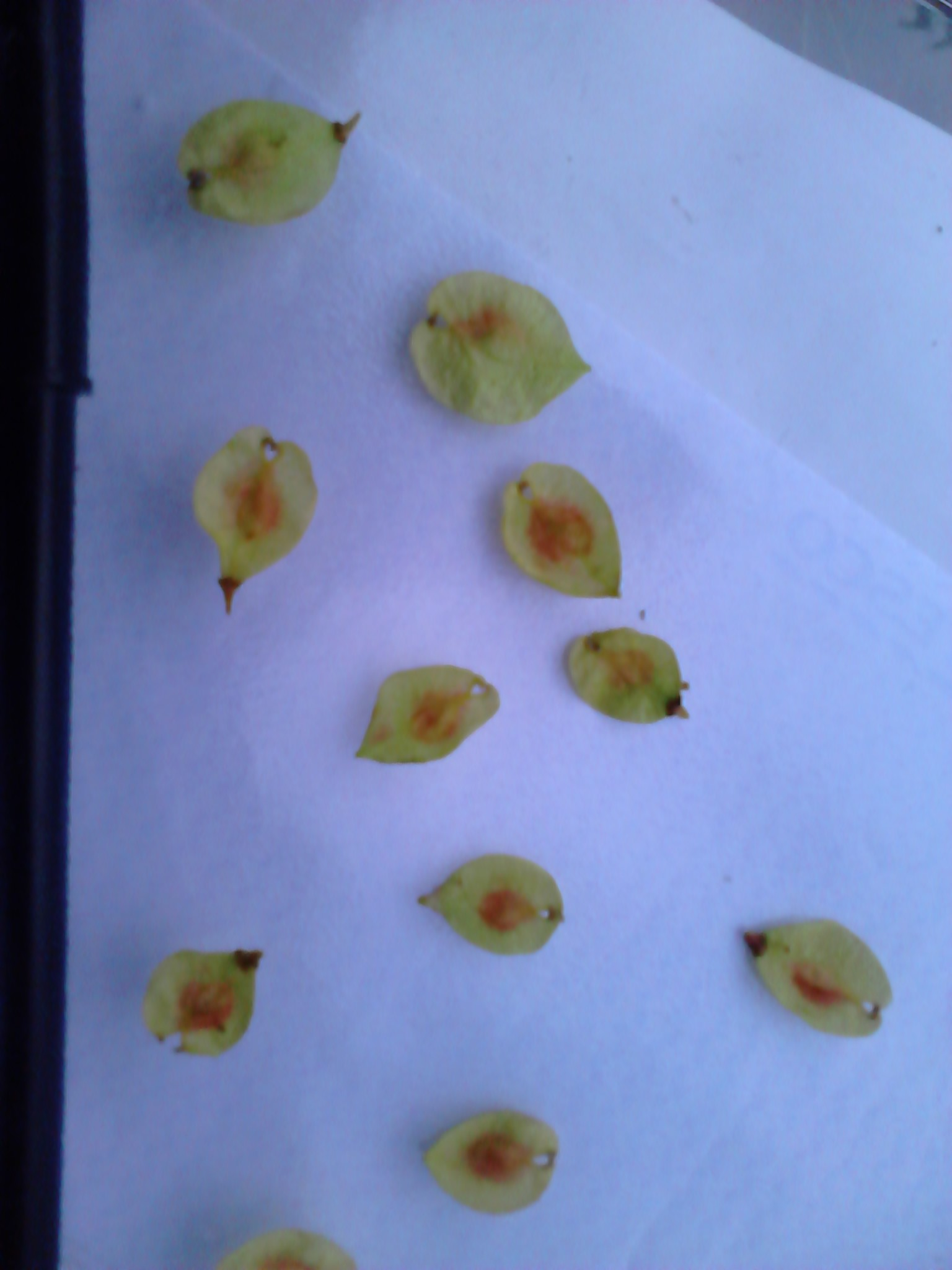
Samarae of Links Place elm

== Etymology ==
Uncertain; the tree is probably named either for Julius Rüppell, owner of the Peter Smith & Co nursery in Hamburg during the latter part of the 19th century, or for the naturalist and explorer Eduard Rüppell.

== Accessions ==
None known.
