= Ulmus × hollandica 'Dauvessei' =

Elm cultivar

- Hybrid parentage: U. glabra × U. minor
- Cultivar: 'Dauvessei'
- Origin: France

The hybrid elm cultivar Ulmus × hollandica 'Dauvessei', one of a number of cultivars arising from the crossing of the Wych Elm U. glabra with a variety of Field Elm U. minor, is a very rare cultivar said to have originated at the D. Dauvesse nursery in Orléans, France before 1877.

== Description ==
According to Henry's description (1913) based on a tree at Kew, the branches ascend to form a broad, pyramidal crown; the leaves bear a resemblance to Wych Elm, but are generally smaller, rarely exceeding 10 cm long by 5 cm wide, and thinner in texture, with petioles nearly 1 cm long. Krüssmann added that the leaf-base was more oblique.

The US National Arboretum, however, described the 'Dauvessei' that once grew in West Potomac Park, Washington, D.C., as similar in appearance to English Elm (in its lower latitude growth-form), forking at about 2 metres, reaching about 20 m tall by 18 m broad. Herbarium specimens from the Washington trees show less elongated, rounder leaves than those at Kew, with fewer vein-pairs.

== Pests and diseases ==
The tree is susceptible to Dutch elm disease.

== Cultivation ==
There are no confirmed surviving specimens of 'Dauvessei'. A tree obtained from Lee of Hammersmith in 1879 grew at Kew Gardens, where it attained a height of 40 feet (12 m). Ulmus hollandica Dauvessei was present in The Hague in the 1930s. In the United States specimens stood along The Mall in Washington D.C. among American elms on either side of the Reflecting Pool (2009), but it is not known whether any survive. A 2018 Cornell University study of the National Mall elms found five possible Ulmus × hollandica there (cultivar unidentified). A tree acquired from the Nobelius nursery in 1929 and grown at the University of Adelaide Waite Arboretum, Australia, died in 1997; Melville confirmed the 'Dauvessei' identification, reconfirmed by the arboretum in 1992.

=== Putative specimen ===
In the UK a broad pyramidal tree matching 'Dauvessei' descriptions and 'Dauvessei' herbarium material from a specimen in West Potomac Park, Washington, D.C., producing hybrid-type samarae, stands in the east corner of Claremont Park, Leith, by Seafield Place. Its location and tidy shape suggest a named cultivar.

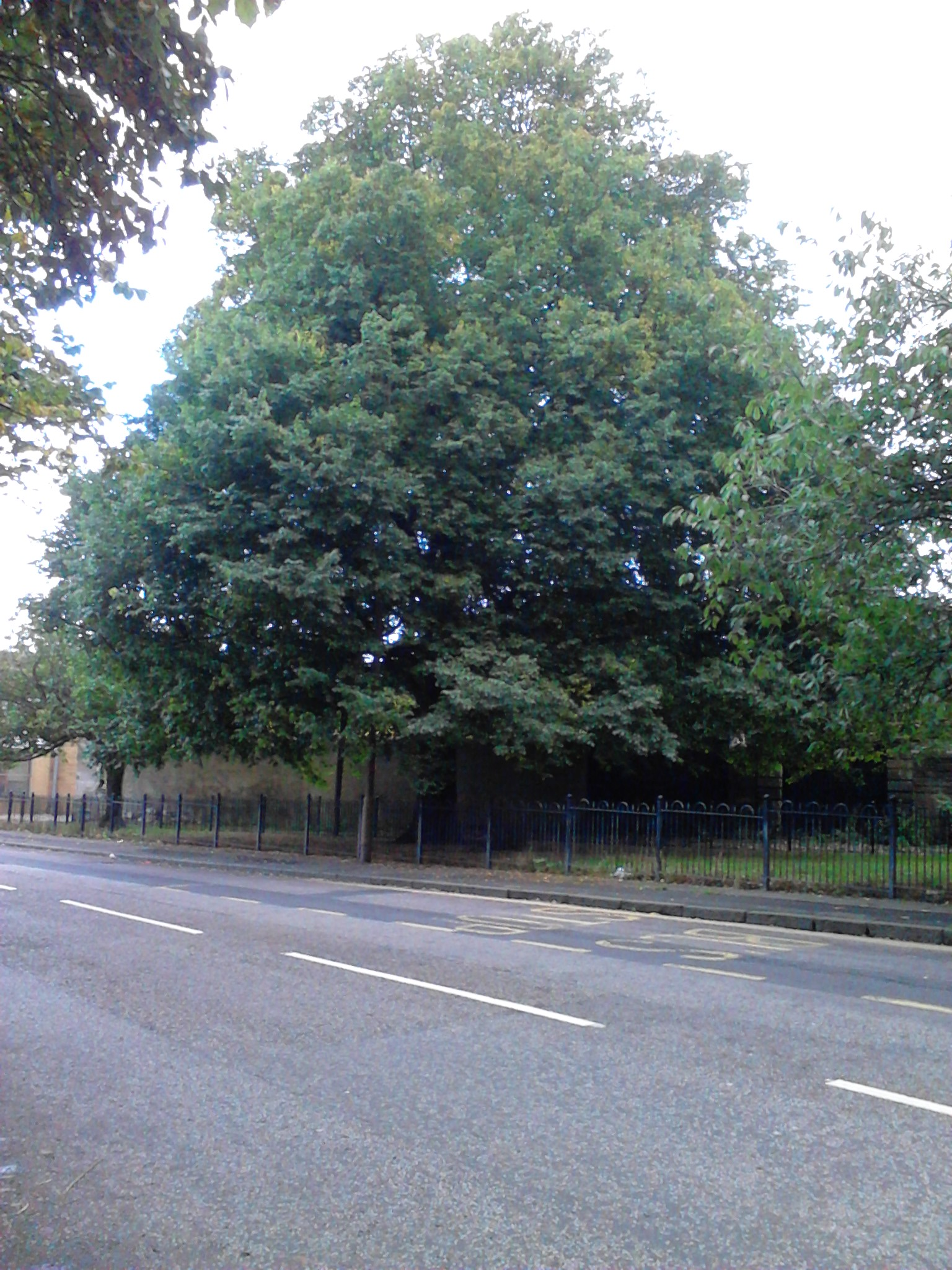
Seafield Place elm

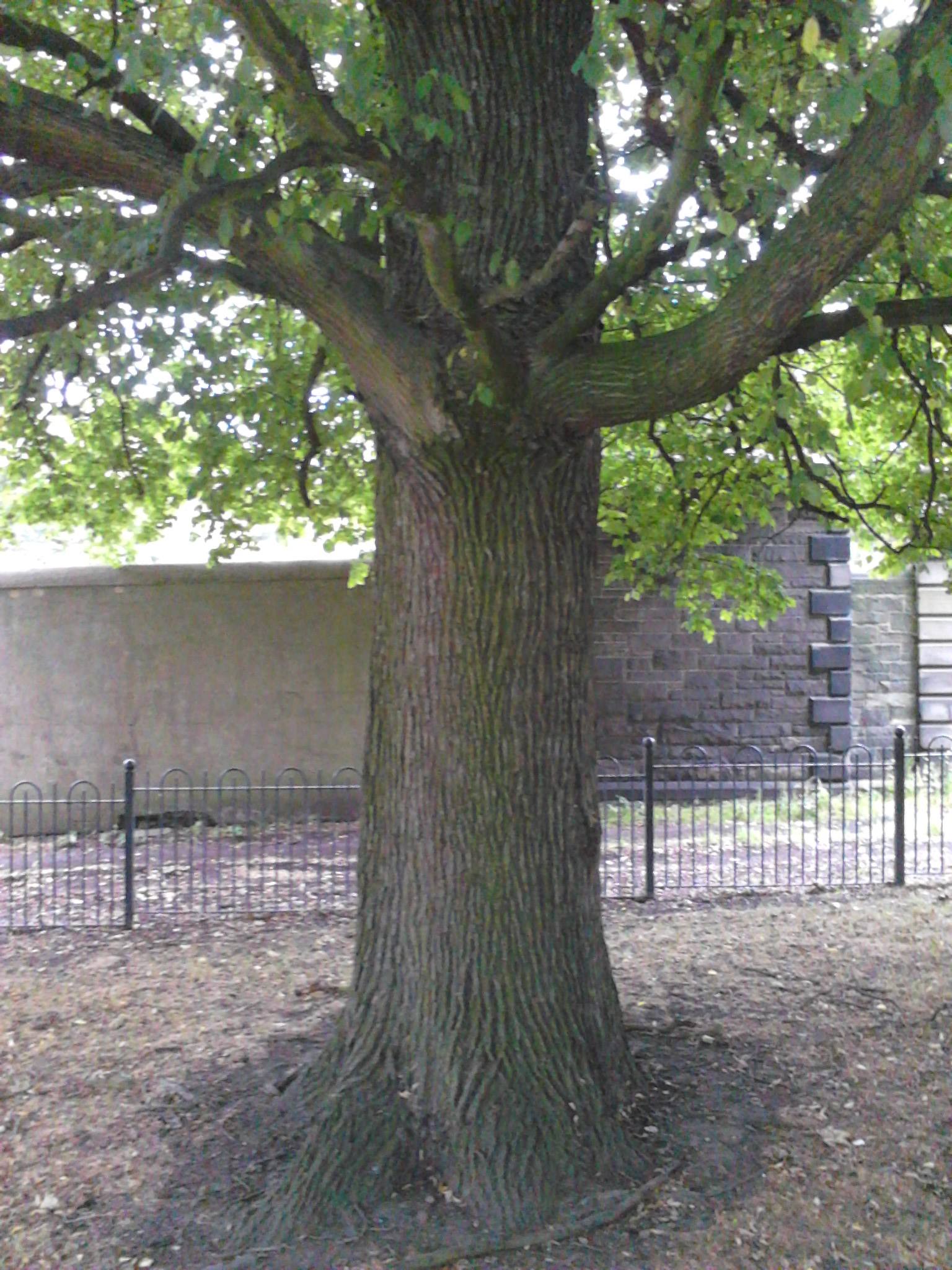
Bole of same

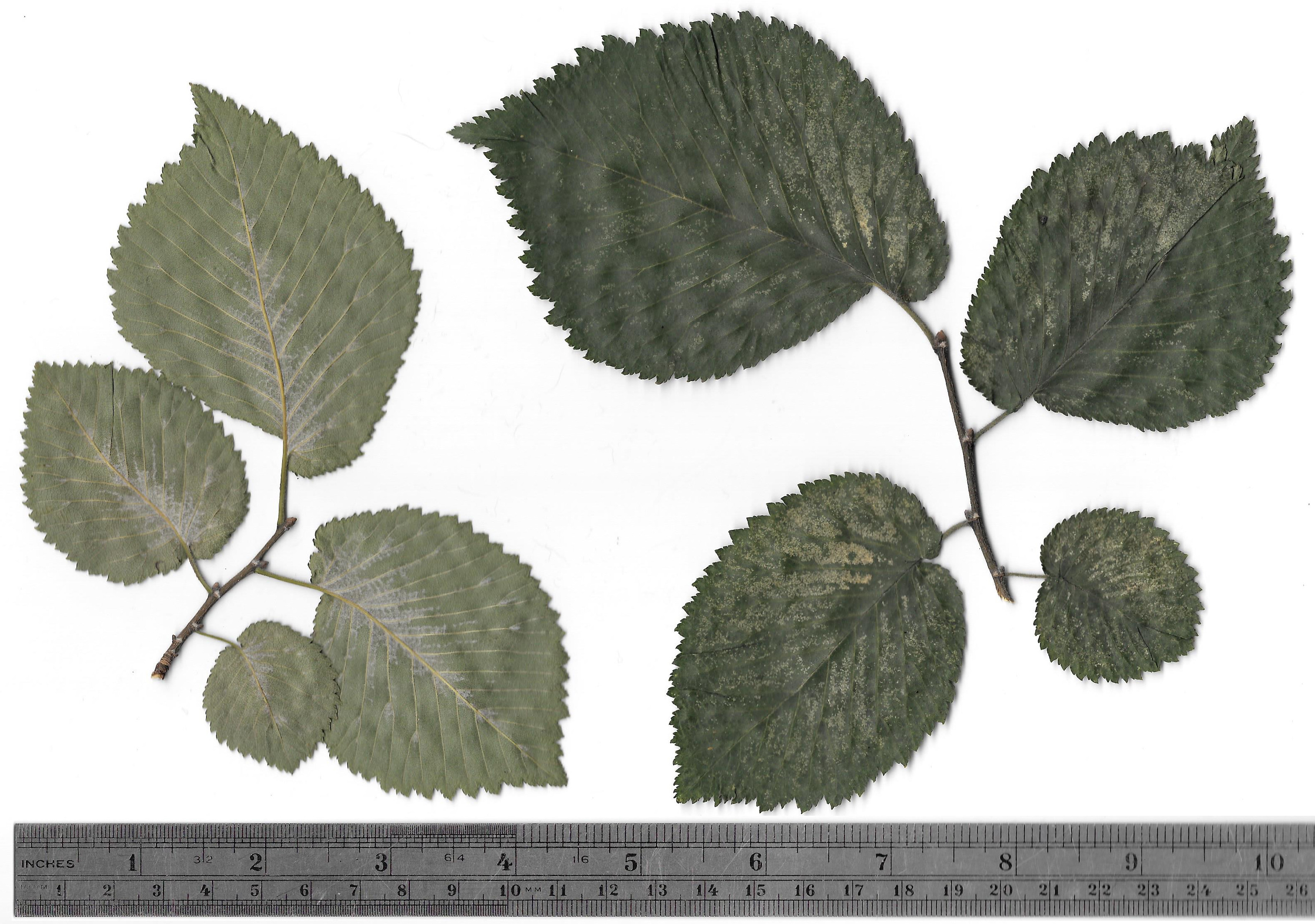
Leaves of same, August

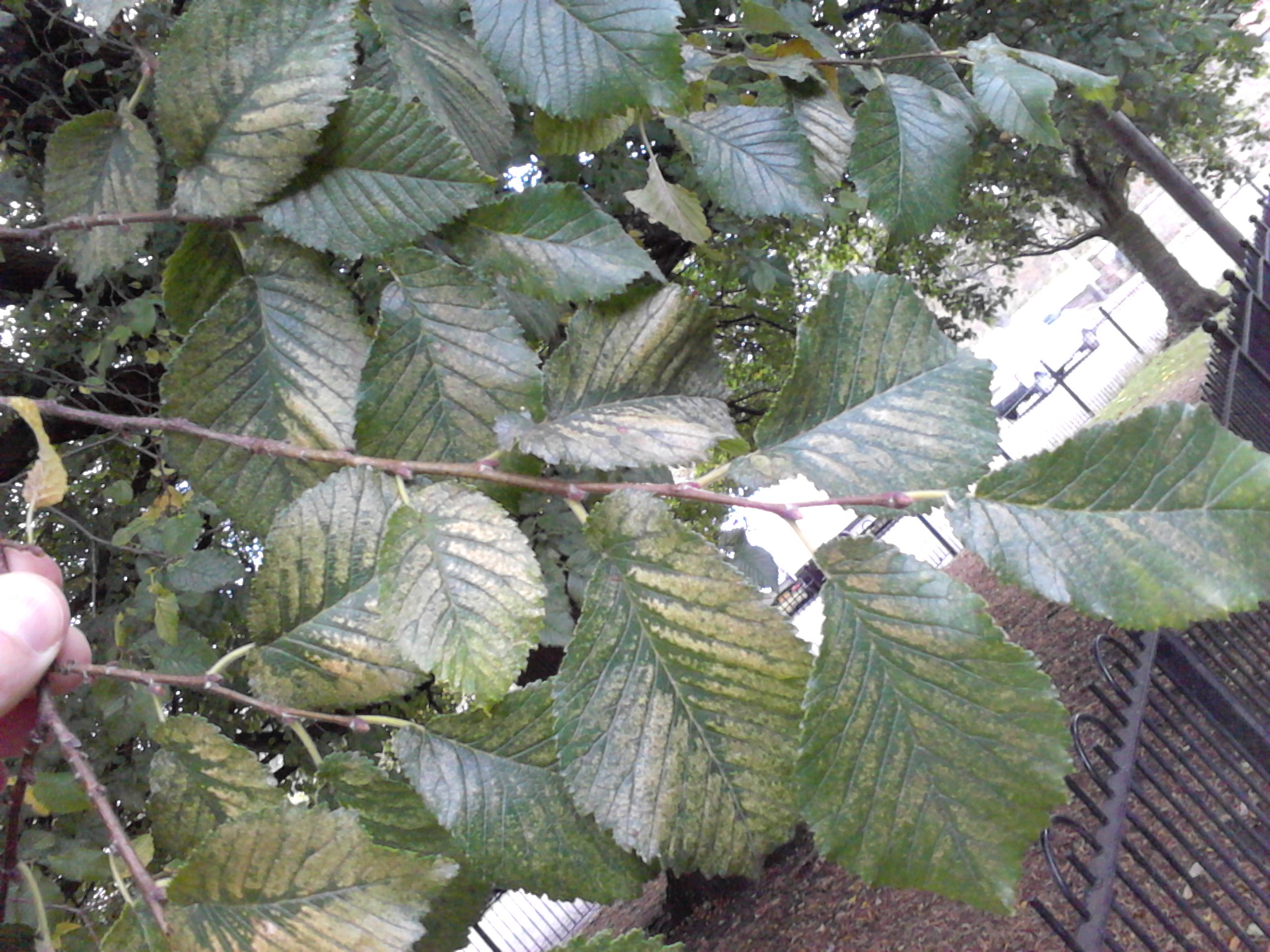
Foliage, October

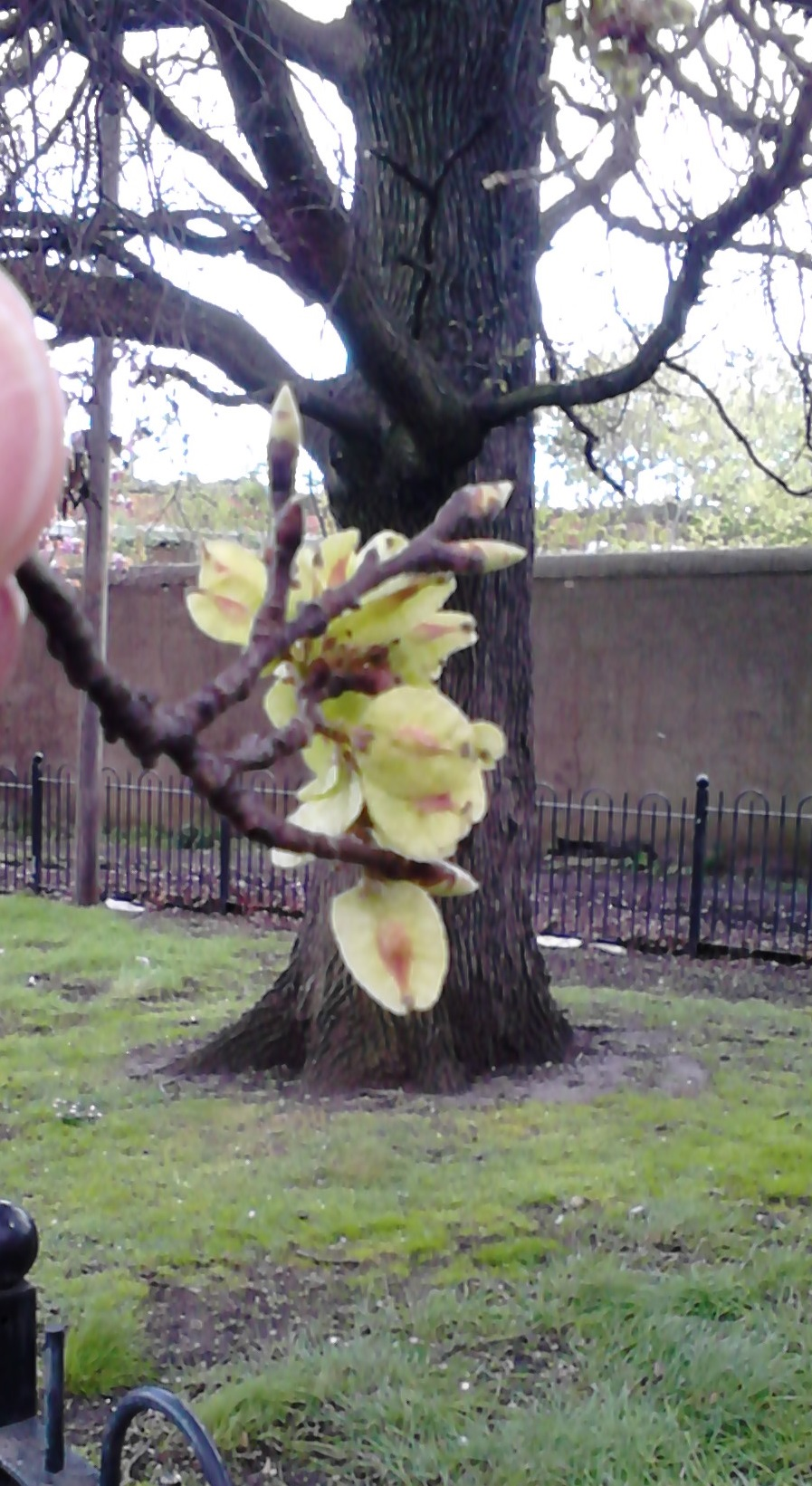
Samarae of same

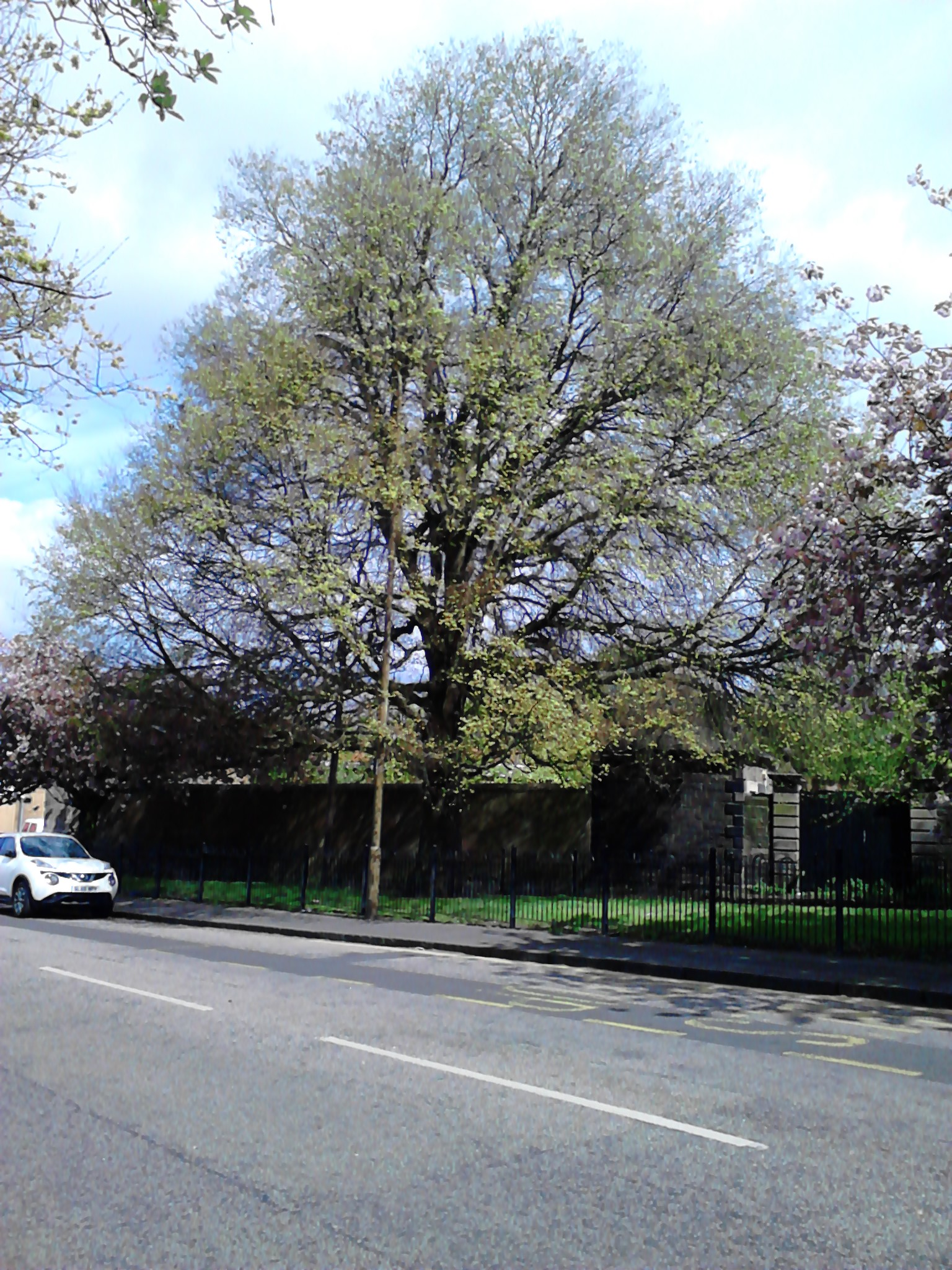
Same, spring

== Hybrid cultivars ==
'Dauvessei' was crossed with Ulmus × hollandica, U. glabra, and U. minor in the Dutch elm breeding programme before World War II, but none of the progeny were of particular note and were discarded.

== Synonymy ==
- Ulmus campestris var. Dauvessi Hort.: Lavallée , Arboretum Segrezianum 235, 1877.
- Ulmus montana var. Dauvessei: Nicholson, Kew Hand-List Trees and Shrubs, 2: 139, 1896.
