= Ulmus laevis 'Aureovariegata' =

Elm cultivar

- Species: Ulmus laevis
- Cultivar: 'Aureovariegata'
- Origin: Europe

The European White Elm cultivar Ulmus laevis 'Aureovariegata' (also 'Aureo-variegata'), a yellow-variegated form, may have been the tree first listed, without description, in Hortus Regius Monacensis (1829) as Ulmus effusa (: laevis) variegata, grown at the Munich Botanic Garden. An Ulmus effusa (: laevis) fol. variegatis (Hort.) was first described c.1890 by the Späth nursery of Berlin, which distributed the tree in the late 19th century. The name U. effusa (: laevis) f. aureovariegata appeared in Beissner and Schelle's Handbuch der Laubholz-Benennung, 1903, without description.

There was also an Ulmus laevis cultivar 'Punctata', with white-flecked leaves.

== Description ==
Henry (1913) briefly described Aureo-variegata as having "leaves spotted with yellow". The leaves of Späth's U. effusa fol. variegatis (Hort.) (1890) were "colourfully marbled and streaked".

== Cultivation ==
No specimens are known to survive. The cultivar, present in Späth's late 19th-century catalogues, is absent from his early 20th, perhaps suggesting that the leaves were prone to revert to green.
