= Ulmus laevis var. parvifolia =

Scientific classification
- Kingdom: Plantae
- Clade: Tracheophytes
- Clade: Angiosperms
- Clade: Eudicots
- Clade: Rosids
- Order: Rosales
- Family: Ulmaceae
- Genus: Ulmus
- Species: U. laevis
- Variety: U. l. var. parvifolia

Trinomial name
- Ulmus laevis var. parvifolia Jovanović & Radulović

Variety of plants

Ulmus laevis var. parvifolia is a mutant variety of European white elm found exclusively on the island of Ada Ciganlija, in the Sava at Belgrade, Serbia.

== Description ==
The tree is small and has a dense crown. The leaves are much smaller than those of the species, 21 – 59 mm (average 40 mm) in length by 14 – 36 mm (average 26 mm) width, and chartreuse in colour. The specimen of var. parvifolia on Ada Ciganlija is very slow-growing, attaining a height of only 5.5 m in almost 60 years, with a d.b.h. of just 13 cm.

== Pests and diseases ==
Not known, but the species has field resistance to Dutch elm disease, through the presence of a triterpene, Alnulin, in the bark which acts as an antifeedant to the vector Scolytus beetles.

== Cultivation ==
The tree is not known to have ever flowered, thus propagation is by cuttings only. The variety is not known to be in commerce in Serbia or elsewhere.
