= Ulmus laevis var. celtidea =

Scientific classification
- Kingdom: Plantae
- Clade: Tracheophytes
- Clade: Angiosperms
- Clade: Eudicots
- Clade: Rosids
- Order: Rosales
- Family: Ulmaceae
- Genus: Ulmus
- Species: U. laevis
- Variety: U. l. var. celtidea

Trinomial name
- Ulmus laevis var. celtidea Rogow.

Variety of elm

Ulmus laevis var. celtidea Rogow. [: like Celtis, the leaves] is a putative variety of European White Elm first described by Rogowicz, who found the tree in 1856 along the river Dnjepr near Chernihiv in what is now northern Ukraine. The type specimen is held at the National Herbarium of Ukraine. The variety was first named as Ulmus pedunculata var. celtidea. Litvinov (1908) considered it a species, calling it Ulmus celtidea Litv., a view not upheld by other authorities.

Similar trees were later found near Briansk in Oryol Oblast, but featured larger leaves.

== Description ==
The leaves are oblong-lanceolate, but only about 25 millimetres (1 in) in length, long-acuminate at the apex, and coarsely, sharply serrate, cuneate and sub-equal at the base. The samarae were also notably smaller than the species. A 1906 herbarium specimen (leaves and fruit) in the Berlin Botanical Museum labelled U. celtidea Litv., from Orel province, Russia, has, however, leaves to 2 or 3 inches.

== Cultivation ==
One specimen which grew at the Strona Arboretum, University of Life Sciences, Warsaw, Poland, (as Ulmus celtidea Litv.) died circa 2006. The tree was grown from seed collected from a tree at the Arboretum of the Forest-Technical Academy in St. Petersburg in 1961; it is not known whether this source is still alive. No cultivars or hybrid cultivars are known.

== Accessions ==
=== North America ===
- Morton Arboretum, US. Acc. no. 1302-27 Grafts (6) from Arnold Arboretum of Harvard University (received as Ulmus laevis var. celtidea).

=== Europe ===
- Royal Botanic Gardens Wakehurst Place, UK. Acc. no. 1973-21047, as Ulmus laevis var. glabra obtained from a grafted tree grown at Kew now lost; provenance notes of the latter have not survived either.

== Synonyms ==
- Ulmus celtidea: Litvinov, Schedae. Herb. Fl. Ross., vi. 167, 1908.
- Ulmus pedunculata var. celtidea. Rogow. 1856.
- Ulmus effusa Will. f. celtidea Rogow.
- (?) Ulmus pedunculata (: laevis) var. glabra: Trautvetter, Bulletin de la Classe physico-mathématique de l'Académie impériale des sciences de Saint-Pétersbourg, xv. 349 1857
