= Ulmus laevis 'Urticifolia' =

Elm cultivar

- Species: Ulmus laevis
- Cultivar: 'Urticifolia'
- Origin: France

The European White Elm cultivar Ulmus laevis 'Urticifolia' known as the nettle leaved elm was raised by Jacques as a chance seedling in 1830, and propagated by grafting. It was later mentioned by de Vries in 1906.

== Description ==
Jacques described the leaves as looking like those of the ordinary nettle. An 'Urticifolia' was described as having deeply toothed leaves, the teeth unequal and very pointed. However, there were other elm cultivars named similarly to 'Urticifolia', and so the description may not be of this U. laevis clone.

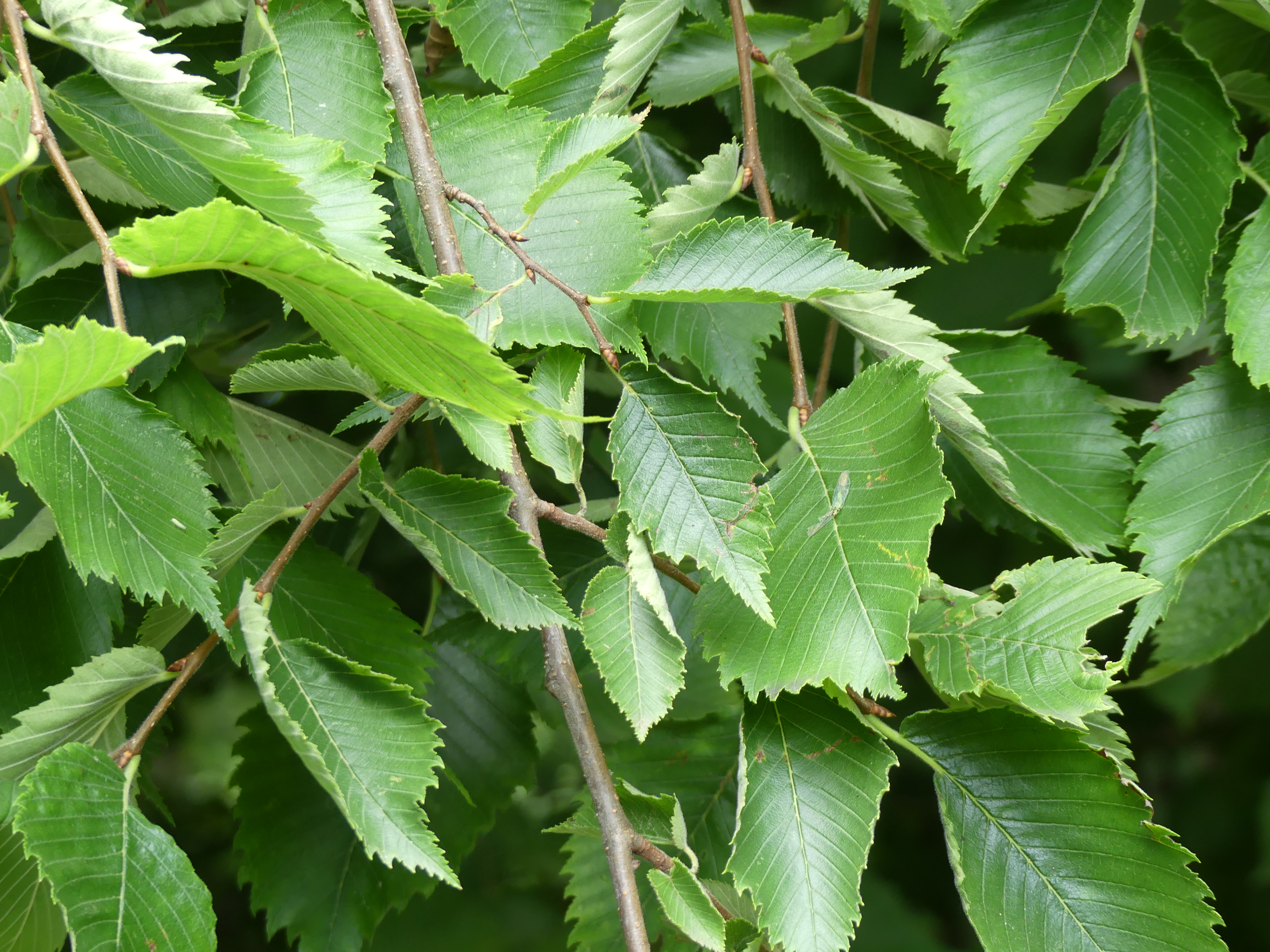
Nettle-like leaves of an U. laevis, Rittergut Eckerde I Park, Lower Saxony (2024)

== Cultivation ==
No specimens are known to survive.

== Accessions ==
Not known.
