= Ulmus laevis var. simplicidens =

Scientific classification
- Kingdom: Plantae
- Clade: Tracheophytes
- Clade: Angiosperms
- Clade: Eudicots
- Clade: Rosids
- Order: Rosales
- Family: Ulmaceae
- Genus: Ulmus
- Species: U. laevis
- Variety: U. l. var. simplicidens

Trinomial name
- Ulmus laevis var. simplicidens (E. Wolf) Grudz.

Variety of flowering plant

Ulmus laevis var. simplicidens is a variety of the European white elm which exists at the National Botanic Garden of Latvia in Salaspils; it was obtained from St. Petersburg, Russia, in 1964.

== Description ==
The tree was described by Egbert Wolf in 1924. The varietal epithet simplicidens translates as 'simple teeth'.

== Accessions ==
=== Europe ===
- National Botanic Garden of Latvia, Salaspils, Latvia. Acc. no. 18137
