= Ulmus laevis 'Punctata' =

Elm cultivar

- Species: Ulmus laevis
- Cultivar: 'Punctata'
- Origin: Europe

The European White Elm cultivar Ulmus laevis 'Punctata' was mentioned in 1873, 1889, and later in 1903 as U. effusa (: laevis) f. punctata, but without description.

== Description ==
It was described as having leaves flecked with white. Jäger and Beissner described it as having dotted young branches.

== Cultivation ==
No specimens are known to survive.
