= List of elm species =

== Ulmus subgenera and sectional classification ==
Classification of Ulmus is based primarily on Whittemore et al 2021. Previous Ulmus classifications include Wiegrefe et al 1994, and Melville & Heybroek 1971.

- Subgenus Indoptelea
  - Ulmus villosa - marn or cherry bark elm
- Subgenus Oreoptelea
  - U. section Blepharocarpus
    - Ulmus americana - American elm, white elm
    - Ulmus laevis - European white elm, fluttering elm, spreading elm, (US) Russian elm
      - Ulmus laevis var. celtidea
      - Ulmus laevis var. laevis
      - Ulmus laevis var. parvifolia
      - Ulmus laevis var. simplicidens
  - U. section Chaetoptelea
    - Ulmus alata - winged elm, Wahoo
    - Ulmus crassifolia - cedar elm
    - Ulmus elongata - long raceme elm
    - Ulmus ismaelis
    - Ulmus mexicana - Mexican elm
    - Ulmus serotina - September elm
    - Ulmus thomasii - rock elm, cork elm
- Subgenus Ulmus
  - U. section Foliaceae
    - Ulmus castaneifolia - chestnut-leafed elm, multi-nerved elm
    - Ulmus changii - Hangzhou elm
      - Ulmus changii var. changii
      - Ulmus changii var. kunmingensis
    - Ulmus chenmoui - Chenmou elm, Langya Mountain elm
    - Ulmus chumlia
    - Ulmus davidiana - David Elm, Father David's elm
      - Ulmus davidiana var. davidiana
      - Ulmus davidiana var. japonica - Japanese elm, Wilson's elm
    - Ulmus harbinensis - Harbin elm
    - Ulmus microcarpa - Tibetan elm
    - Ulmus minor - field elm
      - Ulmus minor subsp. canescens - grey elm, grey-leafed elm, hoary elm
      - Ulmus minor var. italica - Mediterranean elm
    - Ulmus prunifolia - cherry-leafed elm
    - Ulmus pumila - Siberian elm
    - Ulmus szechuanica - Szechuan elm
  - U. section Microptelea
    - Ulmus lanceifolia - Vietnam elm
    - Ulmus parvifolia - Chinese elm, lacebark elm
      - Ulmus parvifolia var. coreana - Korean lacebark elm
      - Ulmus parvifolia var. parvifolia
  - U. section Trichocarpus
    - Ulmus glaucescens - Gansu elm
      - Ulmus glaucescens var. glaucescens
      - Ulmus glaucescens var. lasiocarpa
    - Ulmus lamellosa - Hebei elm
    - Ulmus macrocarpa - large-fruited elm
      - Ulmus macrocarpa var. glabra
      - Ulmus macrocarpa var. macrocarpa
  - U. section Ulmus
    - Ulmus bergmanniana - Bergmann's elm
      - Ulmus bergmanniana var. bergmanniana
      - Ulmus bergmanniana var. lasiophylla
    - Ulmus glabra - wych elm, Scots elm
    - Ulmus laciniata - Manchurian elm, cut-leaf elm
      - Ulmus laciniata var. laciniata
      - Ulmus laciniata var. nikkoensis - Nikko elm
    - Ulmus rubra - slippery elm, red elm
    - Ulmus uyematsui - Alishan elm
    - Ulmus wallichiana - Himalayan elm, Kashmir elm
      - Ulmus wallichiana subsp. xanthoderma
      - Ulmus wallichiana subsp. wallichiana
  - Section Incertae sedis
    - Ulmus gaussenii - Anhui elm
    - Ulmus pseudopropinqua - Harbin spring elm

=== Extinct elms ===
- Fossil elms
  - Ulmus affinis Lesquereux (syn= Ulmus californica Lesquereux)
  - Ulmus braunii Heer
  - Ulmus brownellii Lesquereux
  - Ulmus carpinoides (Goeppert) emd Menzel
  - Ulmus chaneyi Tanai & Wolfe
  - Ulmus chuchuanus (Berry) LaMotte
  - Ulmus fushunensis Wang, Manchester, Li, & Geng
  - Ulmus minima Ward
  - Ulmus minoensis Huzioka
  - Ulmus miopumila Hu & Chaney
  - Ulmus moorei Chaney & Elias
  - Ulmus moragensis Axelrod nom. dubium
  - Ulmus newberryi Knowlton
  - Ulmus okanaganensis Denk & Dillhoff (subgenus Ulmus)
  - Ulmus owyheensis Smith
  - Ulmus paucidentata Smith
  - Ulmus protojaponica Tanai & Onoe
  - Ulmus pseudo-americana Lesquereux
  - Ulmus pseudolongifolia Oishi & Huz
  - Ulmus pyramidalis Goeppert
  - Ulmus pseudopyramidalis Kvaček & Hably
  - Ulmus rhamnifolia Ward
  - Ulmus speciosa Newberry (syn= Ulmus tanneri Chaney)
  - Ulmus stuchlikii Kohlman-Adamska, Ziembińska-Tworzydło, & Zastawniak
  - Ulmus subparvifolia Nathorst
  - Ulmus tenuiservis Lesquereux (syn= Ulmus montanensis Becker)

Ulmus eolaciniata was moved from Ulmus to the new combination Rubus eolaciniata by Tanai and Wolfe in 1977.

== See also ==
- List of elm cultivars, hybrids and hybrid cultivars
