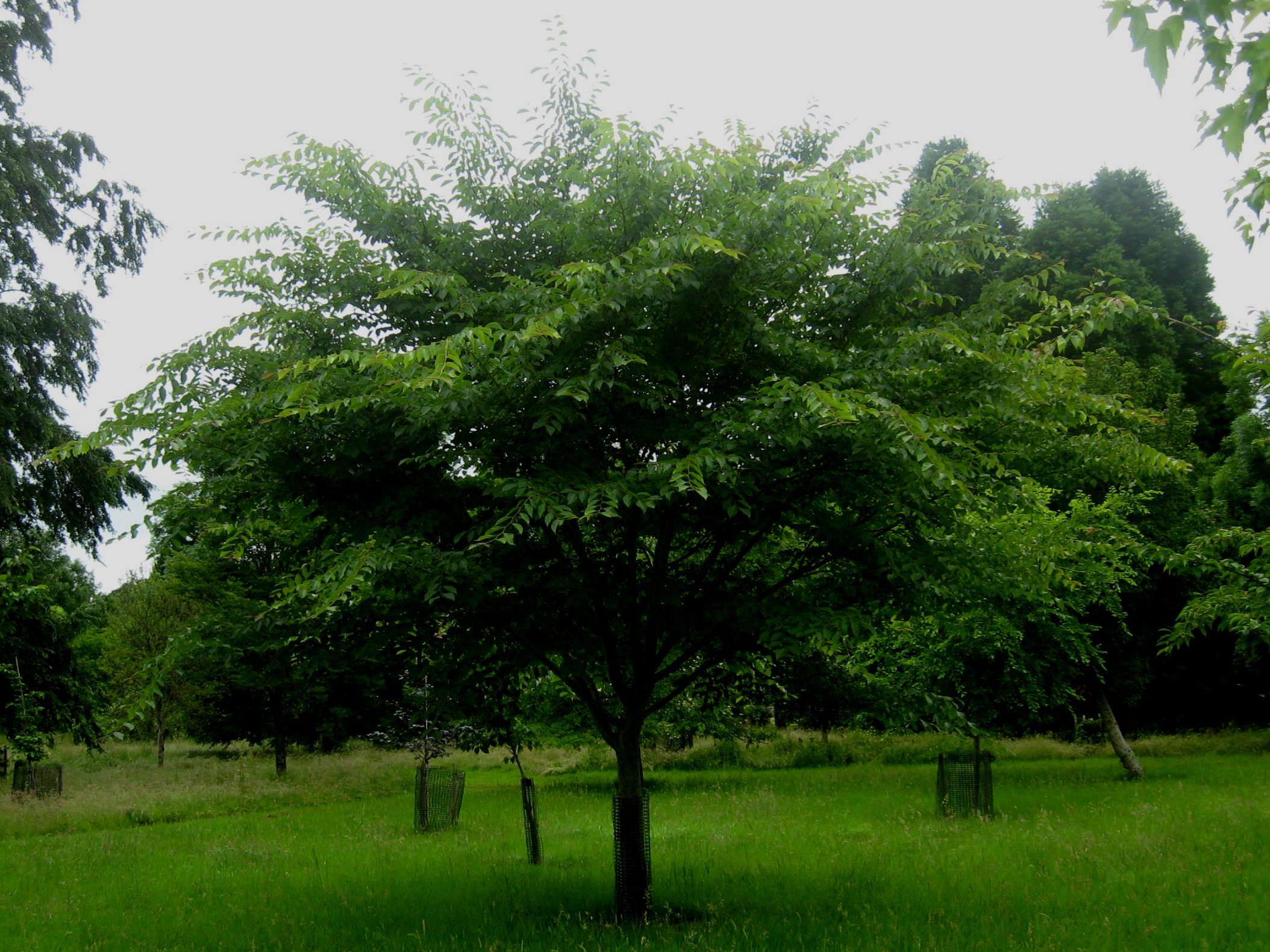
- David Elm, Sir Harold Hillier Gardens, England.

Conservation status
- Least Concern (IUCN 3.1)

Scientific classification
- Kingdom: Plantae
- Clade: Tracheophytes
- Clade: Angiosperms
- Clade: Eudicots
- Clade: Rosids
- Order: Rosales
- Family: Ulmaceae
- Genus: Ulmus
- Subgenus: U. subg. Ulmus
- Section: U. sect. Ulmus
- Species: U. davidiana

Binomial name
- Ulmus davidiana Planch.

Synonyms
- Ulmus davidiana var. mandshurica Skvortsov; Ulmus davidiana var. pubescens Skvortsov

= Ulmus davidiana =

Species of tree

Ulmus davidiana, also known as the David elm, or Father David elm (named after the botanist Armand David, who collected specimens), is a small deciduous tree widely distributed across China, Mongolia, Korea, Siberia, and Japan, where it is found in wetlands along streams at elevations of 2000–2300 m (6,500–7,500 ft). The tree was first described in 1873 from the hills north of Beijing, China.

The tree suffered confusion with Ulmus uyematsui, a Taiwanese species widely planted in China, at the Morton Arboretum.

== Classification ==
Two varieties of Ulmus davidiana are recognized: var. davidiana, occurring only in China, and var. japonica Rehder, the more widely ranging Japanese Elm. Some authorities, however, do not consider japonica to be a variety of U. davidiana, The Illustrated Flora of the Primorsky Territory, Russian Far East (2019), for example, maintaining U. japonica as a species. In 1916 Arnold Arboretum described the two as different species. Harold Hillier originally (1973) listed and described japonica as a variety of U. davidiana, but Hillier's separated the two as distinct species in later editions of their Manual of Trees and Shrubs.

== Description ==
Ulmus davidiana is considered to have a remarkable resemblance to the American elm (U. americana) in all but ultimate size. The tree grows to a maximum height of 15 m (50 ft), with a relatively slender trunk < 0.3 m (1 ft) d.b.h. supporting a dense canopy casting a heavy shade. Its bark remains smooth for a comparatively long time, before becoming longitudinally fissured. The leaves are obovate to obovate-elliptic < 10 cm (4 in) × < 5 cm (2 in), with a petiole of about 10 mm, according to the protologue (the original description); the Flora of China description gives a petiole range of 5-10 mm with an extreme of 17 mm, while Rehder described the petiole simply as 'short'; the upper surface is rough. The perfect, wind-pollinated apetalous flowers are produced on second-year shoots in March, followed by obovate samarae < 19 mm (3/4 in) long × < 14 mm (1/2 in) wide.

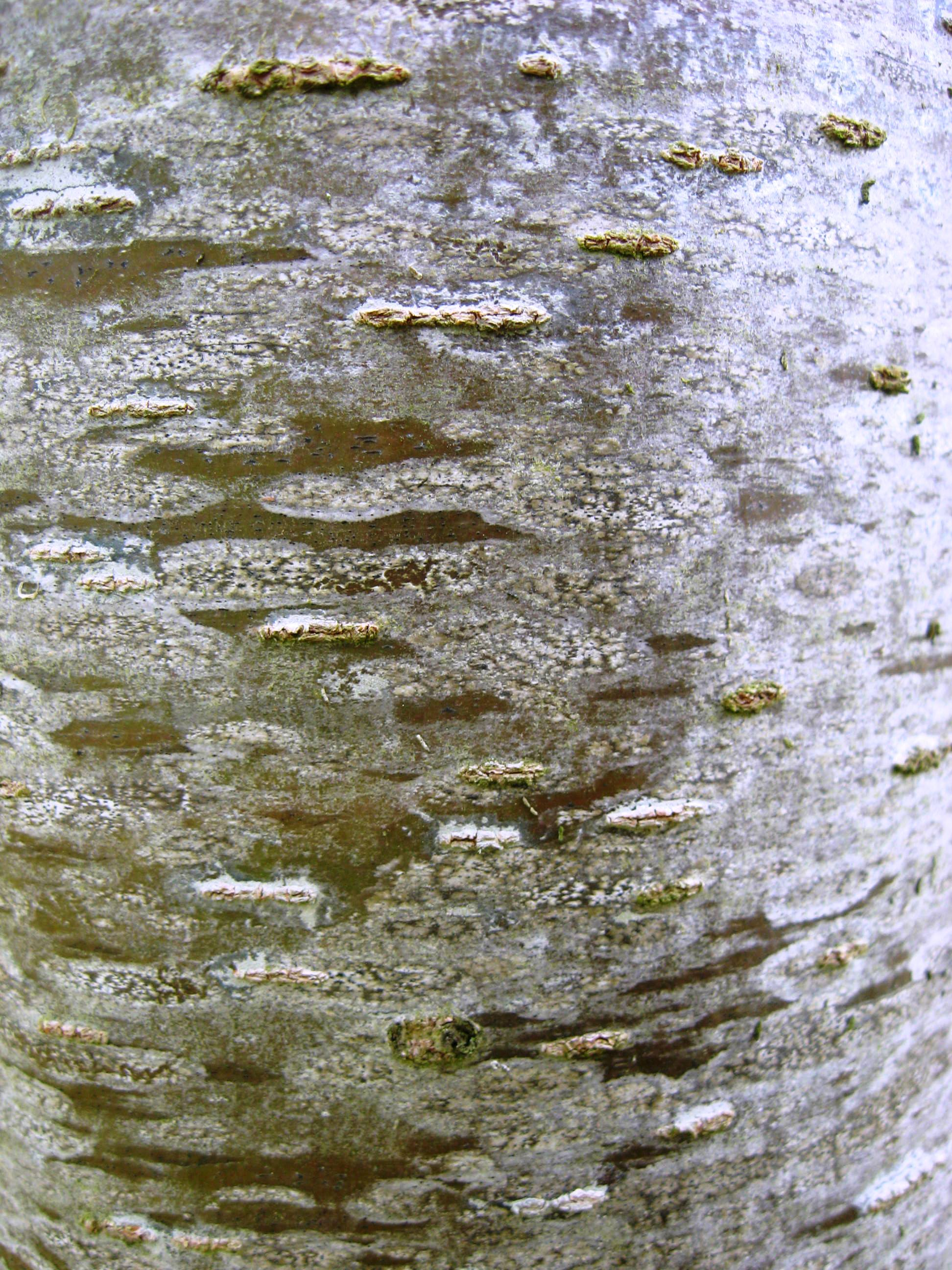
Bark of juvenile tree, Sir Harold Hillier Gardens

== Pests and diseases ==
Evaluated with other Chinese elms at the Morton Arboretum in Illinois, the tree was found to have a good resistance to Dutch elm disease (DED) . The species is reputed to have a good resistance to elm leaf beetle Xanthogaleruca luteola, elm yellows (elm phloem necrosis) and leafminers in the US.

== Cultivation ==
The tree was briefly propagated and marketed by the Hillier & Sons nursery, Winchester, Hampshire from 1971 to 1977, during which time only four were sold.

There are no known cultivars of this taxon, nor is it known to be in commerce beyond the United States.

=== American testing ===
The David Elm has shown some promise as a result of testing at the Ohio State University (OSU) in Ohio. At OSU, the plants were cultivated in copper-lined pots and planted in a wide lawn under a powerline and in small home lawns. The tree's performance has been mixed, but shows potential. Some specimens did extremely well, while others struggled. The tree seems to perform well on disturbed sites, in calciferous (alkaline) soils, and also seems to have a better tolerance for wet soil than the literature has indicated. A number of strong saplings were cultivated that show promise. Some saplings underwent judicious pruning early on to maximize structural stability of the plant ("pruning can help the plant result in a more structurally stable branching pattern"), and blue-colored tree shelters were used on some plants until the stem reached a diameter of 25–37 mm.

Additional observation shows that at least 50% of emerging leaves on the trees survived a hard freeze that lasted 5 days during April 2007. Leaves were approximately 70% emerged when temperatures fell to −6°C (21°F). Temperatures fell below freezing for 5 days (April 4–8, 2007).

== Notable trees ==
The UK TROBI Champion is a relatively young tree at White House Farm, Ivy Hatch, Kent, measuring 5 m high by 17 cm d.b.h. in 2009.

== Etymology ==
The tree is named for Father Armand David, the French missionary and naturalist who introduced the tree to France in the 19th century.

== Accessions ==
North America

- Arnold Arboretum, US. Acc. nos. 5957 (wild collected), 785-80 (cult. from wild material).
- Brenton Arboretum, US. No details available.
- Chicago Botanic Garden, US. Five trees, no other details available.
- Dawes Arboretum, US. , Newark, US. Two trees, Acc. nos. D1997-0455.001 & D2006-0032.001.
- Denver Botanic Gardens, US. Acc. no. 950870. No details available.
- Holden Arboretum, US. Acc. no. 00-318, Three specimens wild collected.
- Morton Arboretum, US. Acc. no. 427-84
- United States National Arboretum, Washington, D.C., US. Acc. no. 64463

Europe

- Arboretum Poort Bulten , Losser, The Netherlands. Acc. no. LOS0243.
- Brighton & Hove City Council, UK. NCCPG Elm Collection.
- Grange Farm Arboretum, Lincolnshire, UK. Acc. no. 510
- Hortus Botanicus Nationalis, Salaspils, Latvia. Acc. no. 18095
- Linnaean Gardens of Uppsala, Sweden. Acc. no. 2001-1659, obtained from South Korea.
- Oxford University Botanic Garden, UK. Acc. no. 0004891.
- Royal Botanic Garden Edinburgh, UK. Acc. no. 20030905 grown from seed wild collected in Korea.
- Sir Harold Hillier Gardens, Hampshire, UK. Acc. nos. 2000.0018, 2004.0514
- Wijdemeren City Council, Netherlands. Elm collection. Planted Smeerdijkgaarde, Kortenhoef 2013.
