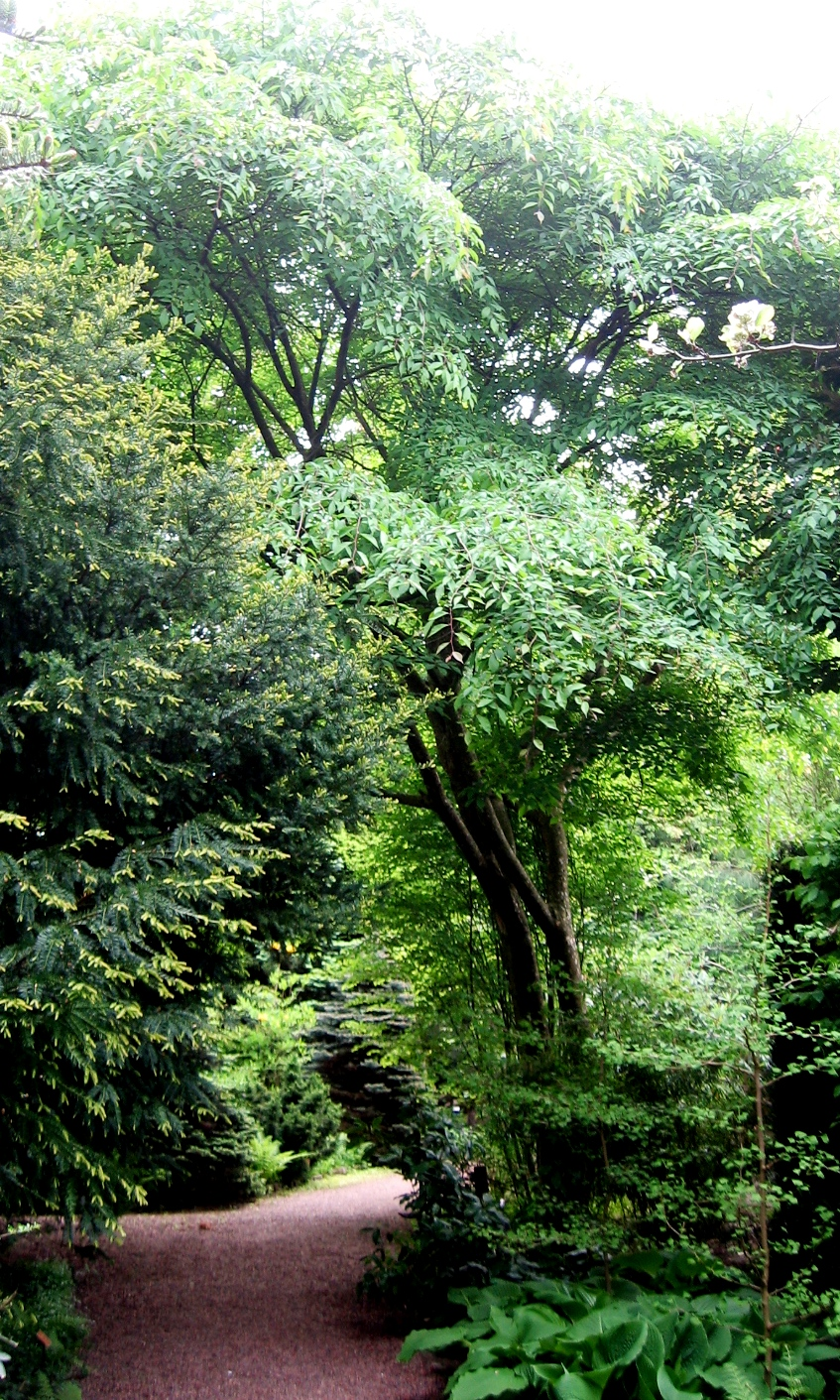
- Ulmus lamellosa Kerkrade Botanical Garden.

Scientific classification
- Kingdom: Plantae
- Clade: Tracheophytes
- Clade: Angiosperms
- Clade: Eudicots
- Clade: Rosids
- Order: Rosales
- Family: Ulmaceae
- Genus: Ulmus
- Subgenus: U. subg. Ulmus
- Section: U. sect. Trichocarpus
- Species: U. lamellosa

Binomial name
- Ulmus lamellosa C.Wang & S.L.Chang

Synonyms
- Ulmus taihangshanensis S.Y.Wang

= Ulmus lamellosa =

Species of tree

Ulmus lamellosa, commonly called the Hebei elm, is a small deciduous tree native to four Chinese provinces, Hebei, Henan, Nei Mongol, and Shanxi, to the west and south of Beijing.

== Description ==
A slow growing tree rarely exceeding 10 m in height, U. lamellosa is often multi-stemmed, its upright branches forming a rounded crown, but occasionally forms a single, slender trunk < 20 cm d.b.h. Considered closely related to the Large-fruited Elm U. macrocarpa, it is distinguishable from that species by its mottled, flaking bark and smaller leaves. The leaves, on 3–8 mm petioles, are obovate, < 10 cm long by 5.5 cm wide, caudate at the apex, with simply to doubly serrate margins, and densely pubescent when young; the leaves turn a rich gold in autumn. The perfect wind-pollinated apetalous flowers are produced on second-year shoots in March–April; the large < 35 mm diameter samarae appear from April to May.

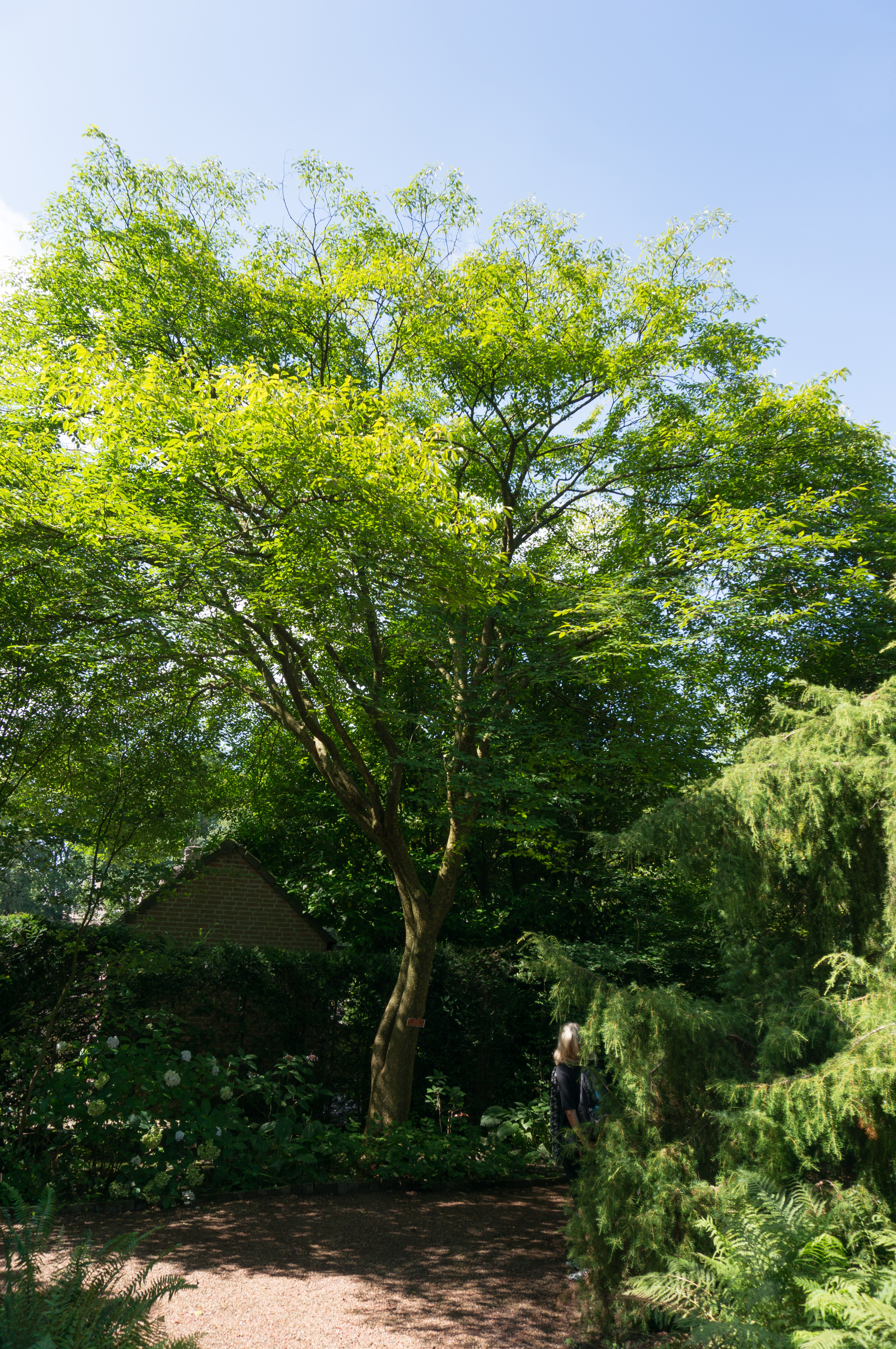
U. lamellosa, Kerkrade Botanical Garden (2017)

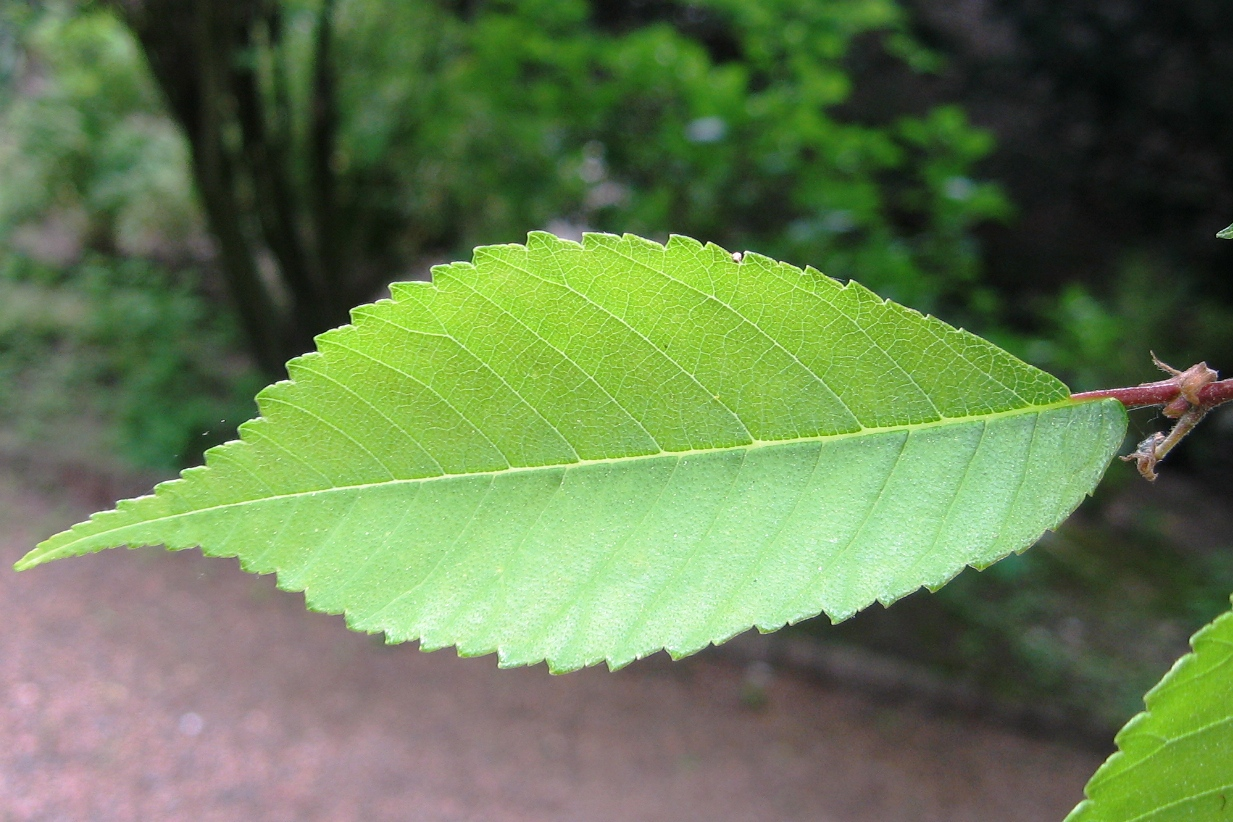
U. lamellosa leaf

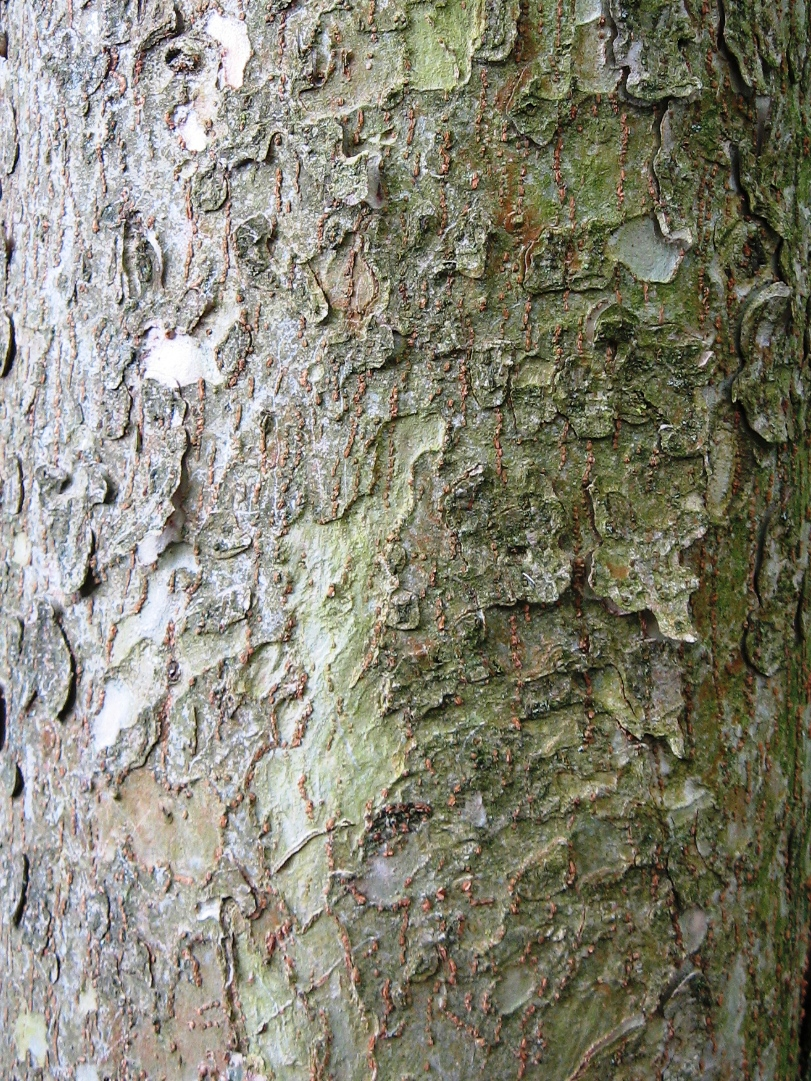
U. lamellosa bark

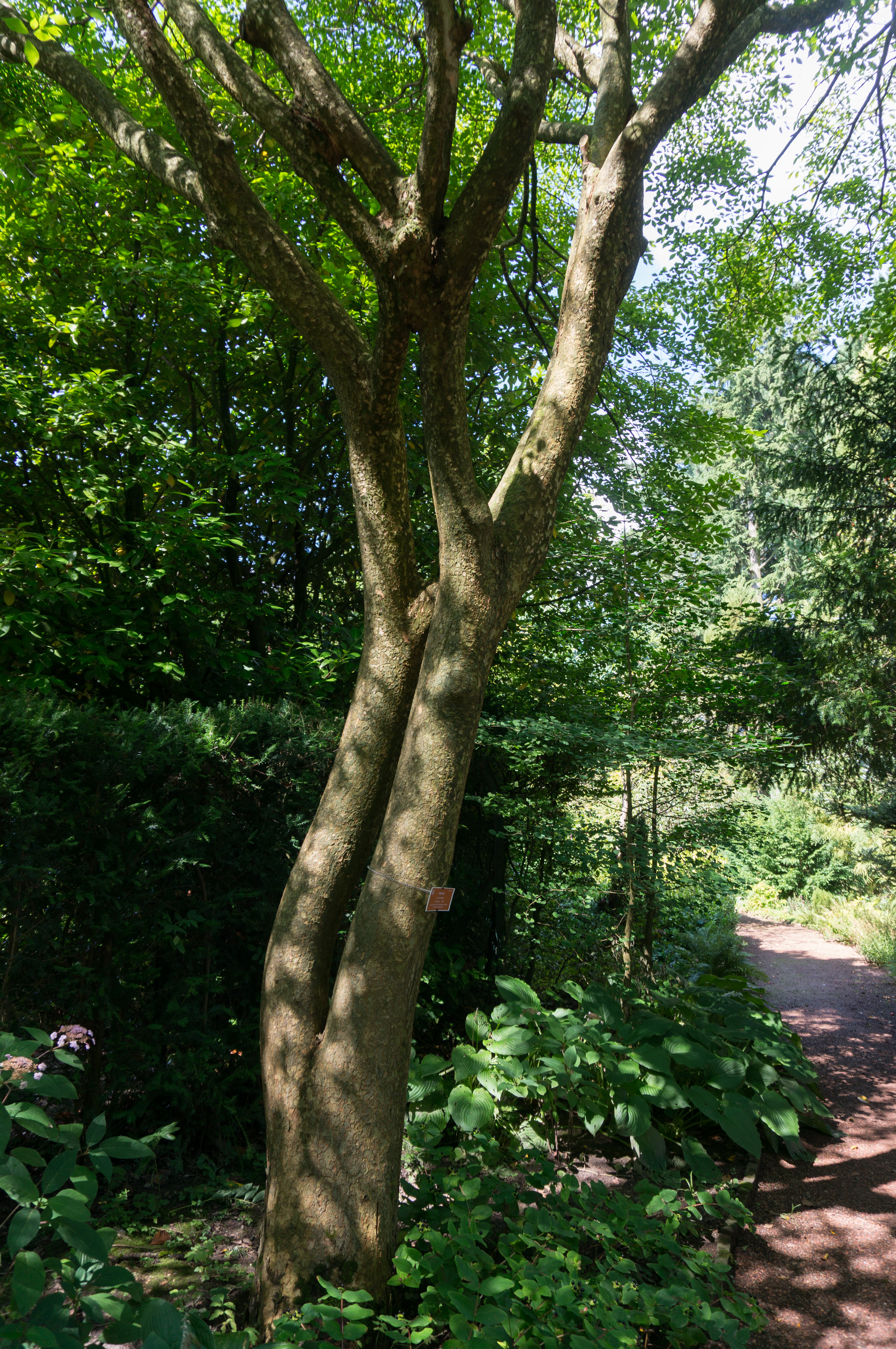
U. lamellosa bole

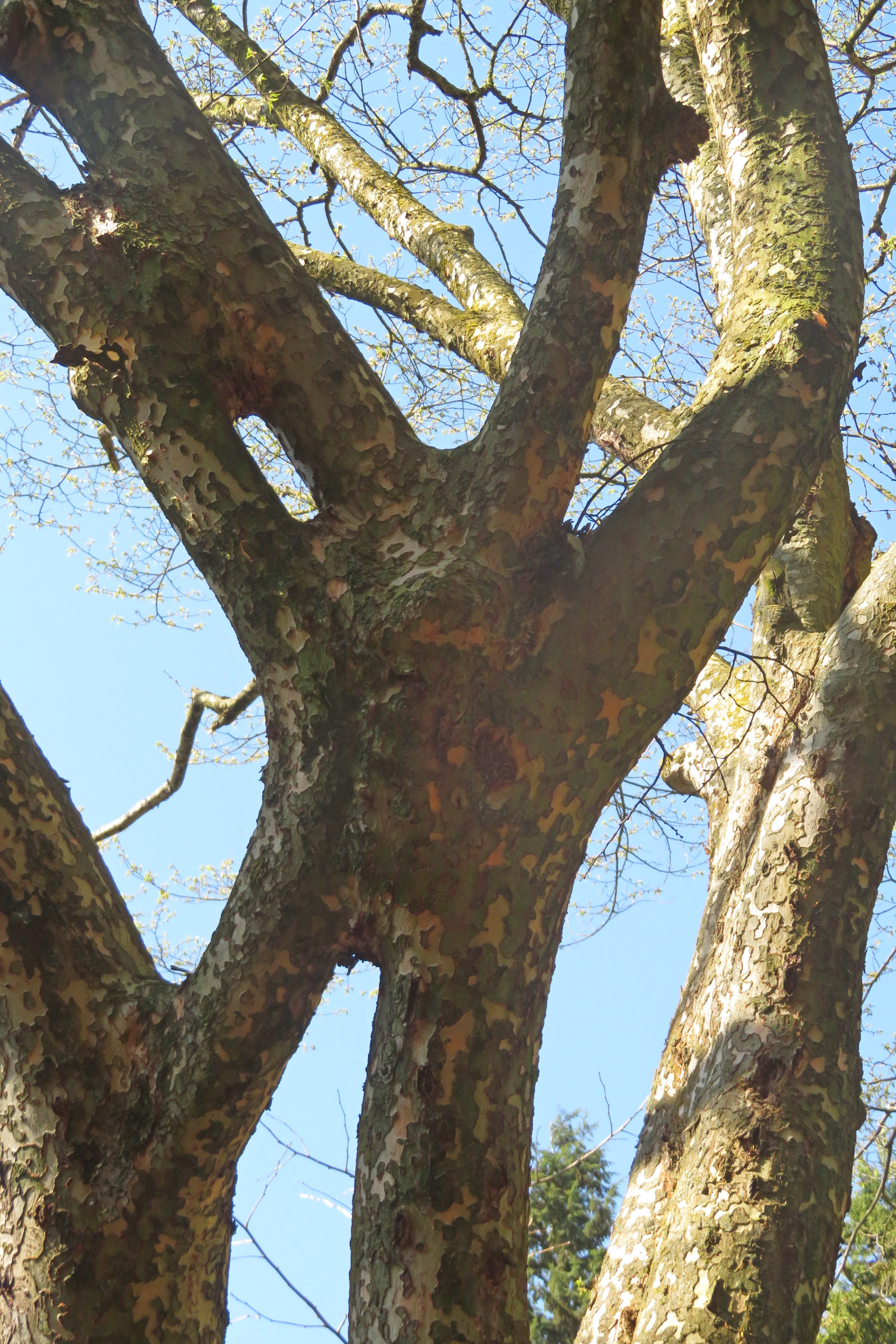
U. lamellosa branching

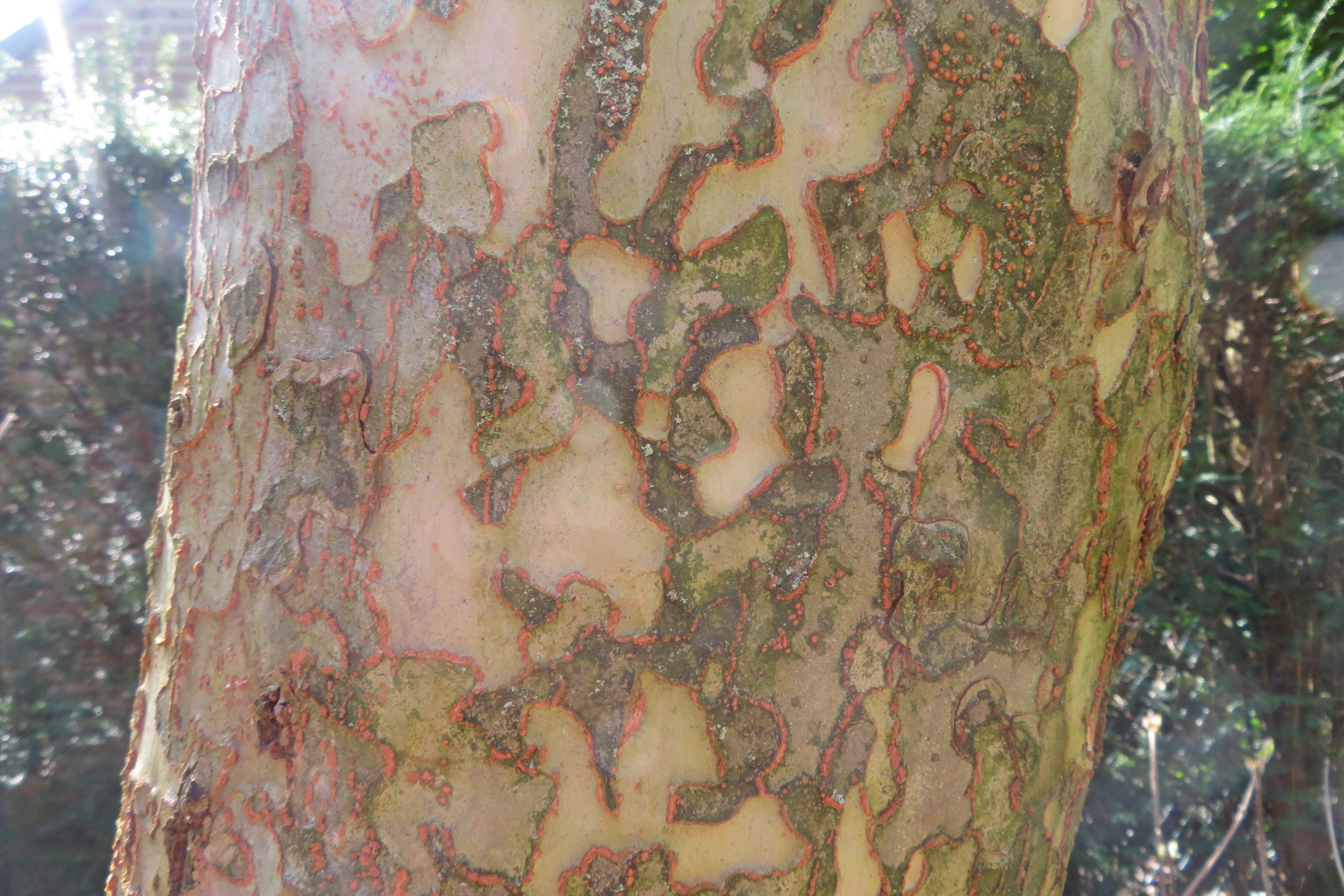
U. lamellosa bark detail

== Pests and diseases ==
In the trials at the Morton Arboretum, Illinois, U. lamellosa was found to have a good resistance to Dutch elm disease. The species was also found to be among the least suitable elms for feeding and reproduction by the Japanese beetle Popillia japonica in the United States.

== Cultivation ==
Rare in cultivation beyond China, it is one of a number of Chinese species which were assessed for their horticultural merit at the Morton Arboretum, where it was adjudged suitable for planting in parks and gardens, but found to be typically intolerant of wet soils. Although known to propagate satisfactorily, U. lamellosa is only very rarely found in commerce in Europe and the United States; there are no known cultivars.

== Accessions ==
North America

- Brenton Arboretum, US. No accession details available.
- Denver Botanic Gardens US. No details available
- Holden Arboretum US. Acc. no. 96–178, provenance unrecorded
- Morton Arboretum US. Acc. nos. 317–90, 51–95, 655–2006, (listed as syn. U. taihangshanensis): 446–2007.
- University of British Columbia Botanical Garden, Vancouver, British Columbia, Canada. Acc. no. 022715-0334-1983.
- United States National Arboretum, Washington, D.C., US. Acc. nos. 68993, 68994, 76228. Also, listed under syn. U. taihangshanensis: 76237, 76245, 68981.

Europe

- Botanical Garden Kerkrade , Kerkrade, Netherlands. One large tree; accession 1983BG03409 height 9,40 m, planted 1985, seed from hortus botanicus Pekinensis.
- Calderstones Park, Liverpool, UK. 3 mature trees by Menlove Avenue wall.
- Grange Farm Arboretum, Lincolnshire, UK. Acc. no. 702.
- RBG Edinburgh, Benmore, UK. Acc. no. 19951216. Wild collected in Yunnan province, China by Sino-Scottish Expedition.
- Royal Horticultural Society gardens, Wisley, UK. Bed WA 0201; (planted 1998, the tree appeared to have succumbed to the drought of summer 2006, and all top growth had died save a few suckers at the base).
- Strona Arboretum, University of Life Sciences, Warsaw, Poland.
- Wijdemeren City Council, Netherlands. Five trees planted 2018 Zodde, Oud-Loosdrecht and Berestein Cemetery, 's-Graveland. View: https://wijdemeren.cobra360.nl/index.php?@iepen
