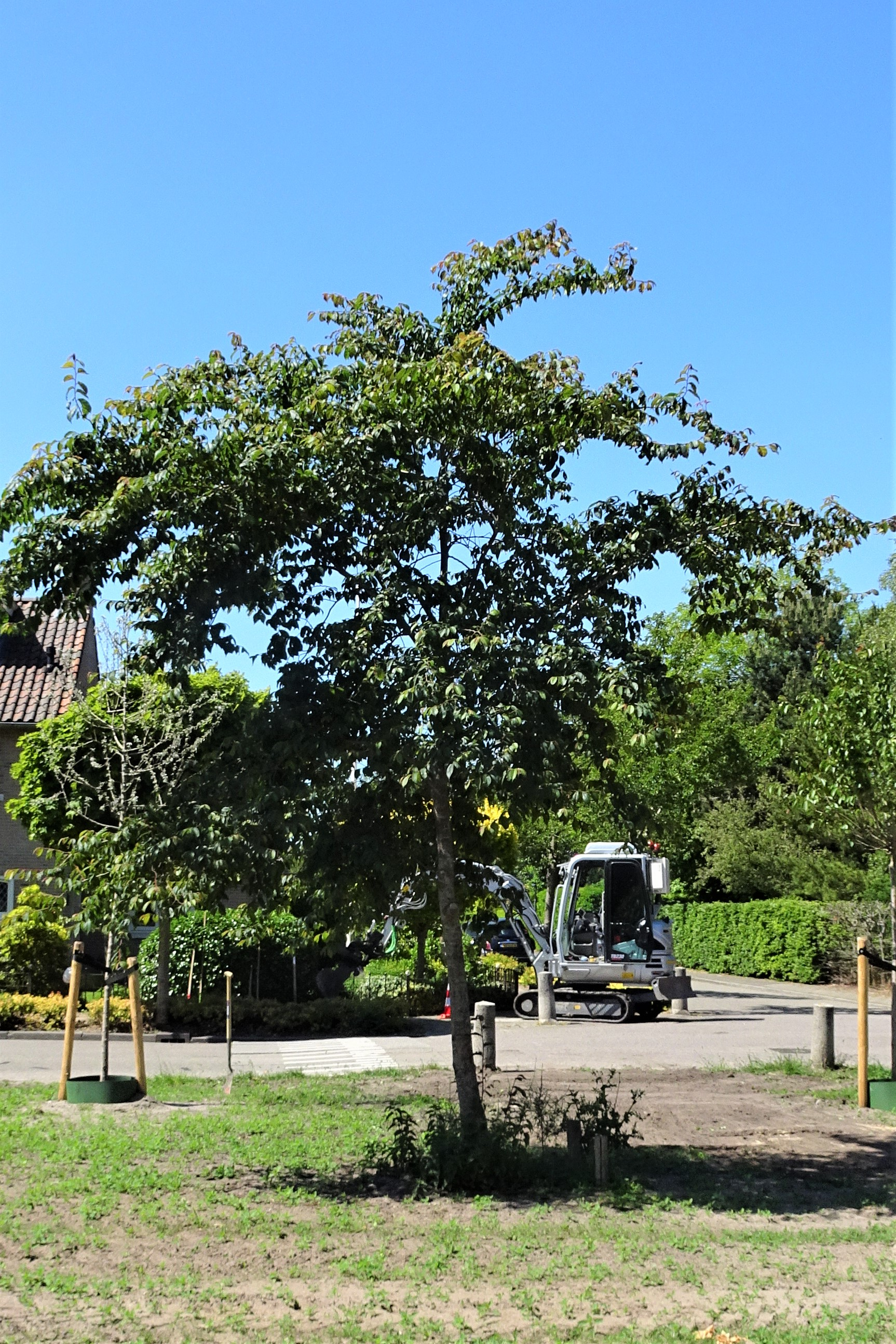
- Ulmus uyematsui in Netherlands

Scientific classification
- Kingdom: Plantae
- Clade: Tracheophytes
- Clade: Angiosperms
- Clade: Eudicots
- Clade: Rosids
- Order: Rosales
- Family: Ulmaceae
- Genus: Ulmus
- Subgenus: U. subg. Ulmus
- Section: U. sect. Ulmus
- Species: U. uyematsui

Binomial name
- Ulmus uyematsui Hayata

= Ulmus uyematsui =

Species of plant

Ulmus uyematsui Hayata, commonly known as the Alishan elm, is endemic to forests at elevations of 800–2,500 metres (2,600–8,200 ft) in Alishan, Chiayi County , central Taiwan, where it is considered one of the minor tree species. The tree was first named and described by the Japanese botanist Bunzō Hayata in 1913, in the aftermath of the First Sino-Japanese War, when the Republic of Formosa was ceded to Japan.

== Description ==
The tree grows to a height of 25 m with a d.b.h. to 80 cm. The bark is grey, longitudinally fissured, and exfoliates in irregular flakes. The branchlets are brown, glabrous, though pubescent when young, and devoid of corky wings. The largely glabrous leaves are elliptic to oblong-elliptic 5–11 cm long × 3–4.5 cm wide (Hui-lin Li in Flora of Taiwan gives 6–15 cm long by 3–5 cm wide), typically caudate at the apex; the margins are doubly serrate. The leaves are oblique at the base, have short (2–6 mm) petioles, and are flushed dark-red (anthocyanin pigmentation) on emergence. The perfect wind-pollinated apetalous flowers appear on second-year shoots in February, the obovate to orbicular samarae, 10–15 × 8–10 mm, on half-centimetre pedicels, in March.

Hayata considered the tree similar to Ulmus castaneifolia, differing only in the much thinner leaves, and absence of pubescence on the axils of the primary lateral veins. This comparison was not repeated in later descriptions.

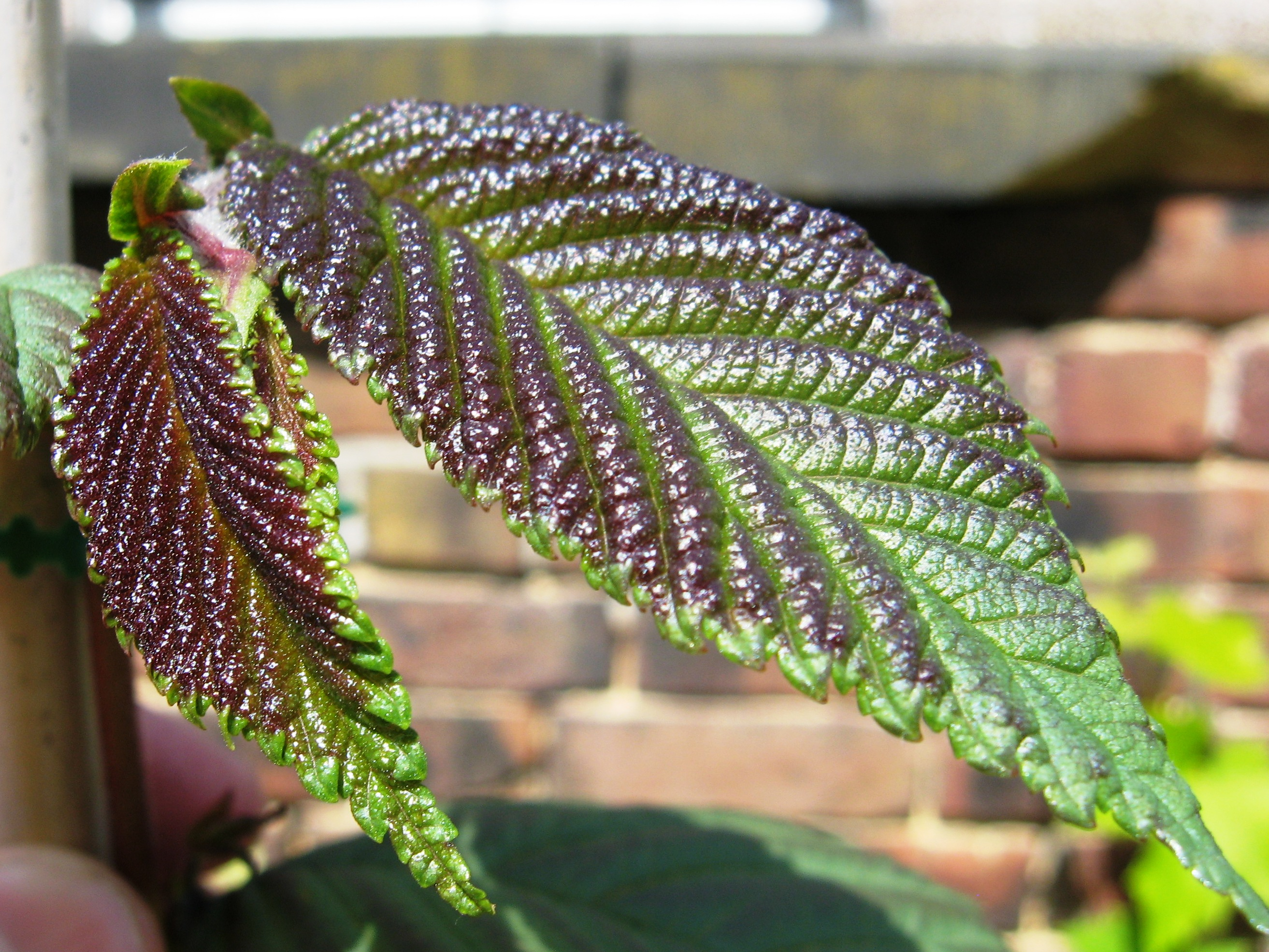
Emergent leaves with dark red colouration

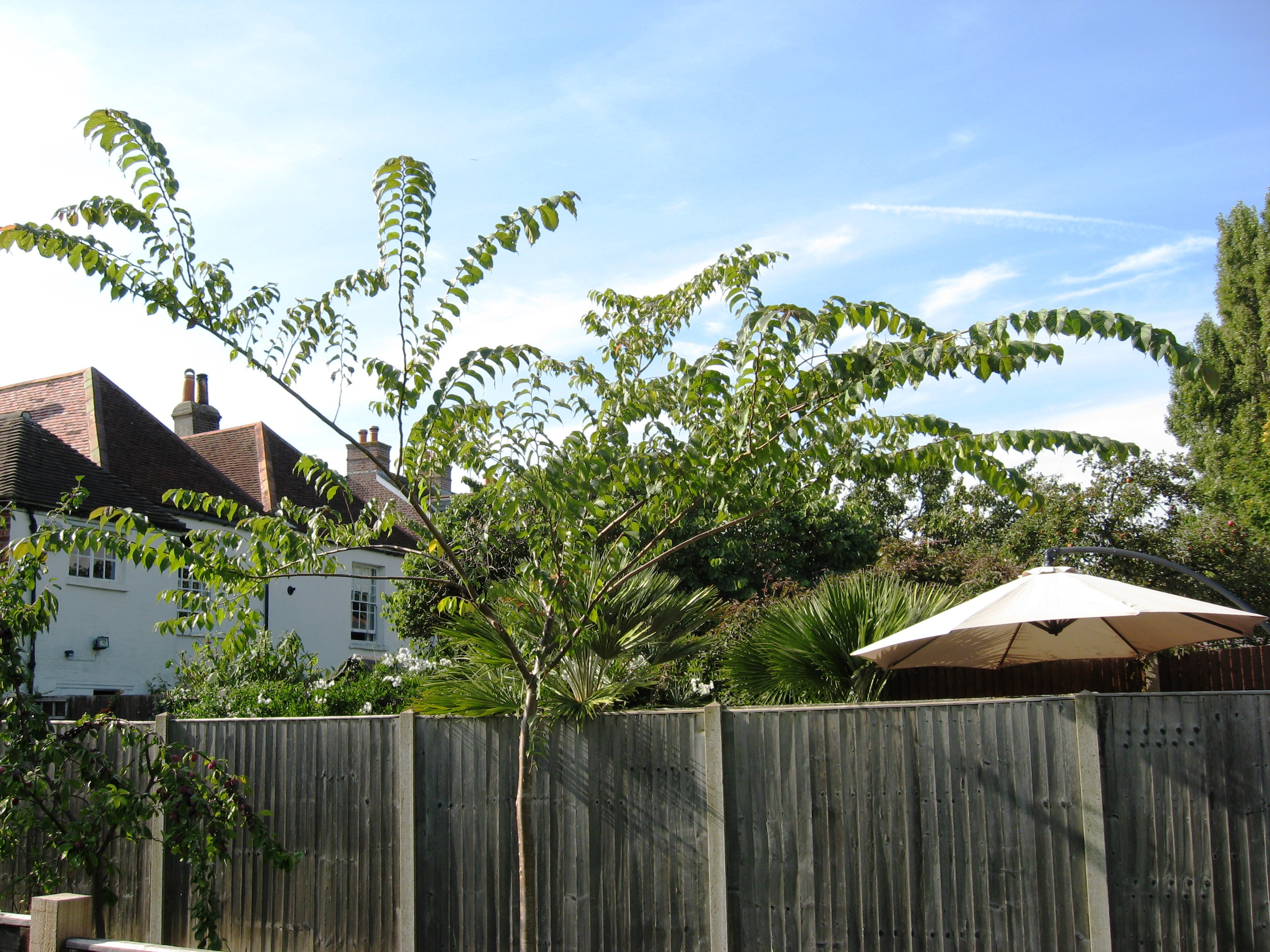
10-year-old tree, Portchester, England

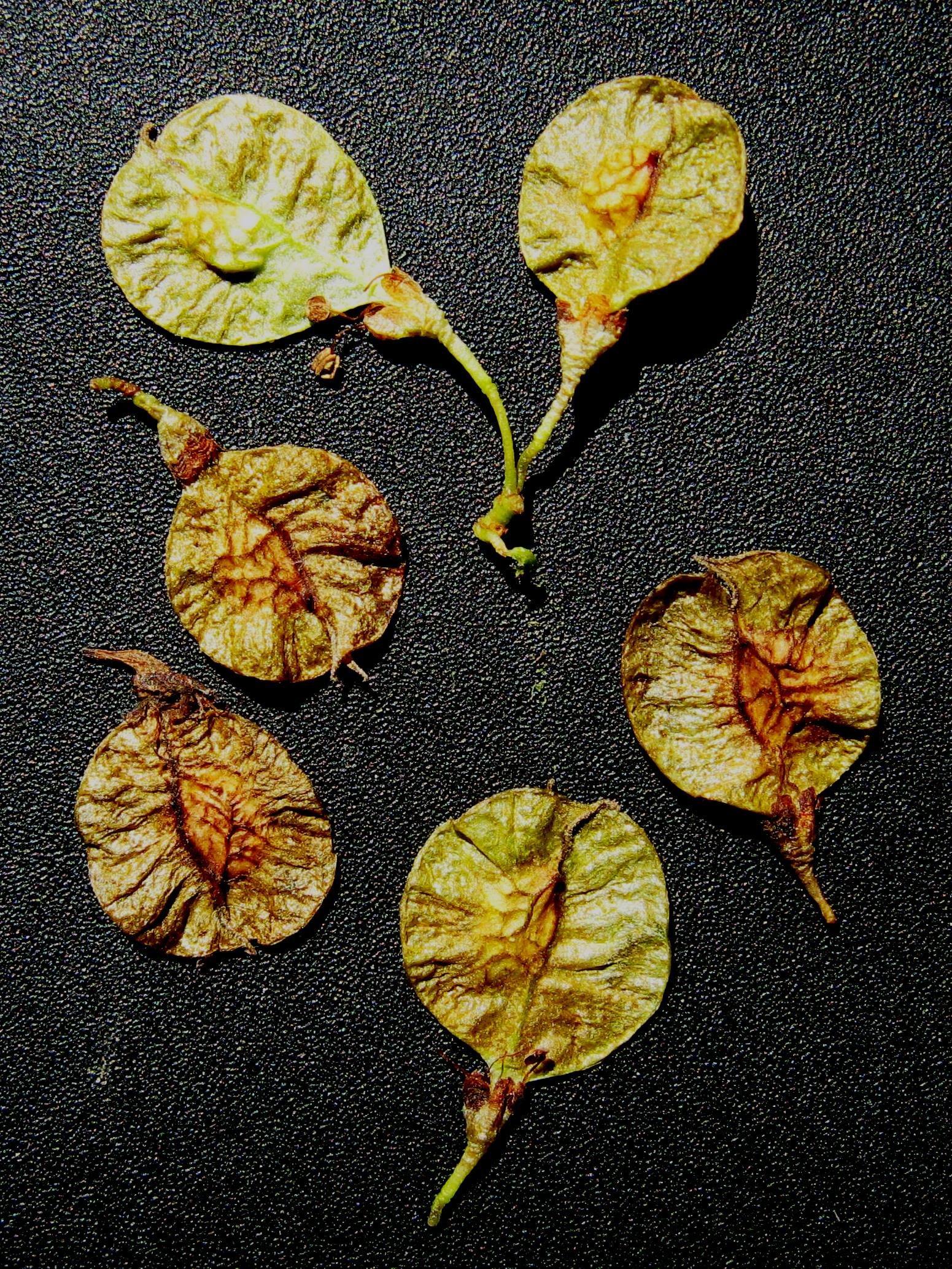
Samarae

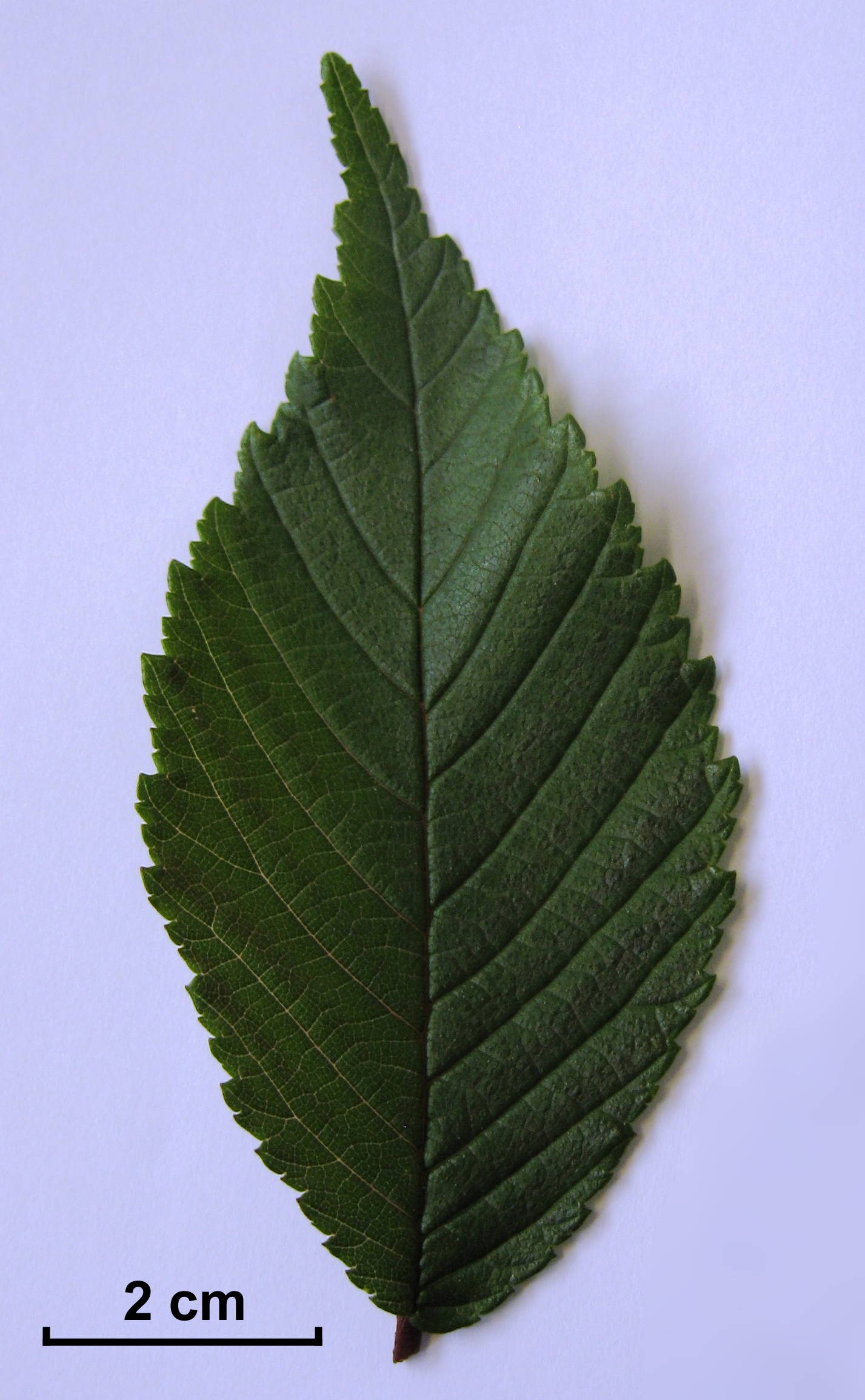
Leaf, with scale

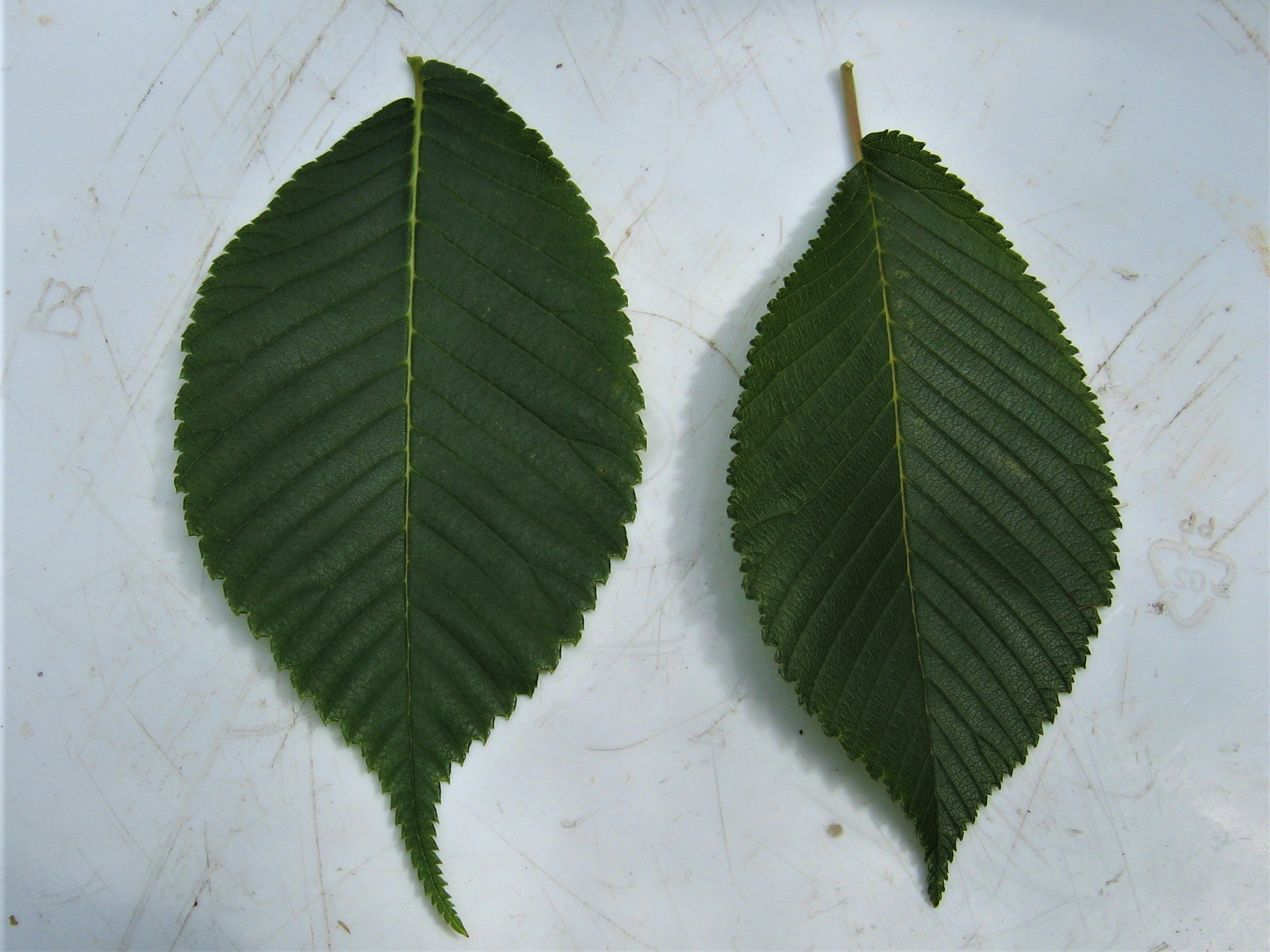
Ulmus uyematsui leaf (left) and Japanese elm leaf (right)

== Pests and diseases ==
Specimens grown from seed in Hampshire, UK, have grown to maturity unaffected by Dutch elm disease. However, at one site all trees were afflicted by slime flux Pectobacterium carotovorum in the summer of 2022 but with no lasting consequences.

== Cultivation ==
U. uyematsui is rare in cultivation beyond Taiwan; it was introduced to commerce in the Netherlands in 2011. U. uyematsui was selected as one of eight tree species considered hardy enough to survive in the ecological reclamation of the Wujiazi iron mine 270 kilometres (170 mi) north-east of Beijing in Liaoning Province, China, where winter temperatures fall as low as −20 °C (−4 °F).

U. uyematsui was introduced to Great Fontley, UK, as seed misidentified as U. davidiana; many were disseminated to the RBG Edinburgh, Sir Harold Hillier Gardens and Spinners Nursery in the New Forest before the error was realized.

== Etymology ==
The species is named for K. Uyematsu, who collected the plant in 1913.

== Accessions ==
=== North America ===
- United States National Arboretum, Washington, D.C., US. Two small trees imported 2011. No accession details available.

=== Europe ===
- Grange Farm Arboretum , Lincolnshire, UK. Acc. no. 839.
- Great Fontley Farm, Fareham, UK. Butterfly Conservation Elm Trials plantation. Three whips planted 2004.
- Istituto per la Protezione delle Piante, Florence, Italy. 2 small (1 m) plants, (2011).
- Royal Botanic Garden Edinburgh, UK. Acc no. 20021373*A, grown from seed wild collected Liaoning, China, and acc. no. 20112233.
- Royal Botanic Gardens, Kew, UK. Acc. no. not known.
- Sir Harold Hillier Gardens, Romsey, Hampshire UK. Acc. no. 2011.0267.
- Wijdemeren Elm Arboretum, Frans Halslaan, Loosdrecht, Netherlands.

== Nurseries ==
Europe

- A Touch of Green , Amstelveen, Netherlands.
- Arboretum Waasland , Belgium.
- Henny Kolster via retail nursery Mark & Rein Bulk , Boskoop, Netherlands.
- Pan-Global Plants , Frampton-on-Severn, Gloucestershire, UK.

Asia

- Tenway Garden Center, Tienwei, Chonghua County, Taiwan.
