= David Elm =

David Elm may refer to:

- David Elm or Ulmus davidiana, a tree
- David Elm (footballer) (born 1983), Swedish footballer
