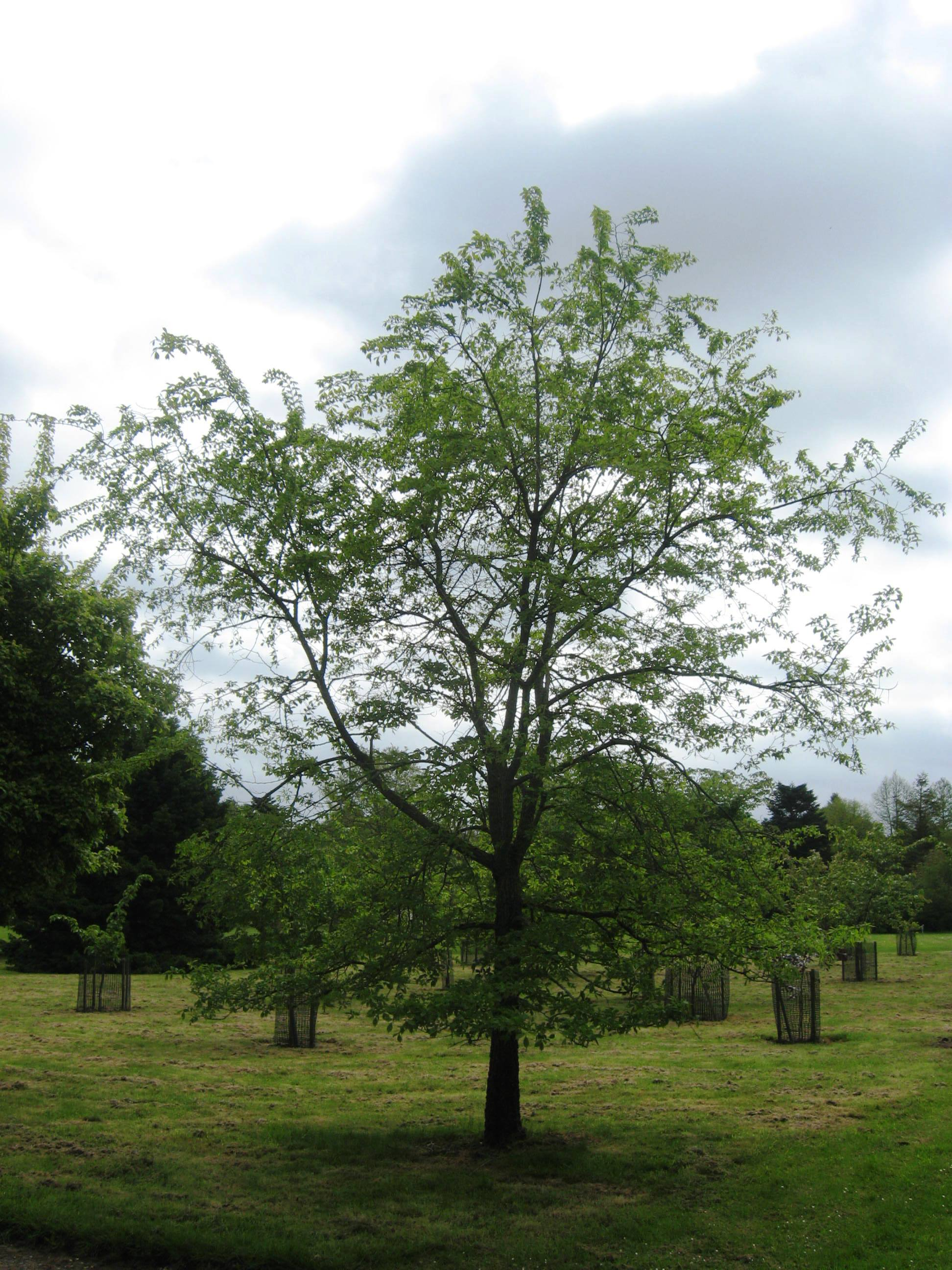
- Ulmus szechuanica, Sir Harold Hillier Gardens

Conservation status
- Least Concern (IUCN 3.1)

Scientific classification
- Kingdom: Plantae
- Clade: Tracheophytes
- Clade: Angiosperms
- Clade: Eudicots
- Clade: Rosids
- Order: Rosales
- Family: Ulmaceae
- Genus: Ulmus
- Species: U. szechuanica

Binomial name
- Ulmus szechuanica Fang

Synonyms
- Sichuan Elm Morton Arboretum; Ulmus erythrocarpa W. C. Cheng

= Ulmus szechuanica =

Species of tree

Ulmus szechuanica Fang, known as the Szechuan (Sichuan), or red-fruited, elm, is a small to medium deciduous Chinese tree found along the Yangtze river through the provinces of Sichuan, Jiangxi, Anhui, and Jiangsu.

== Description ==
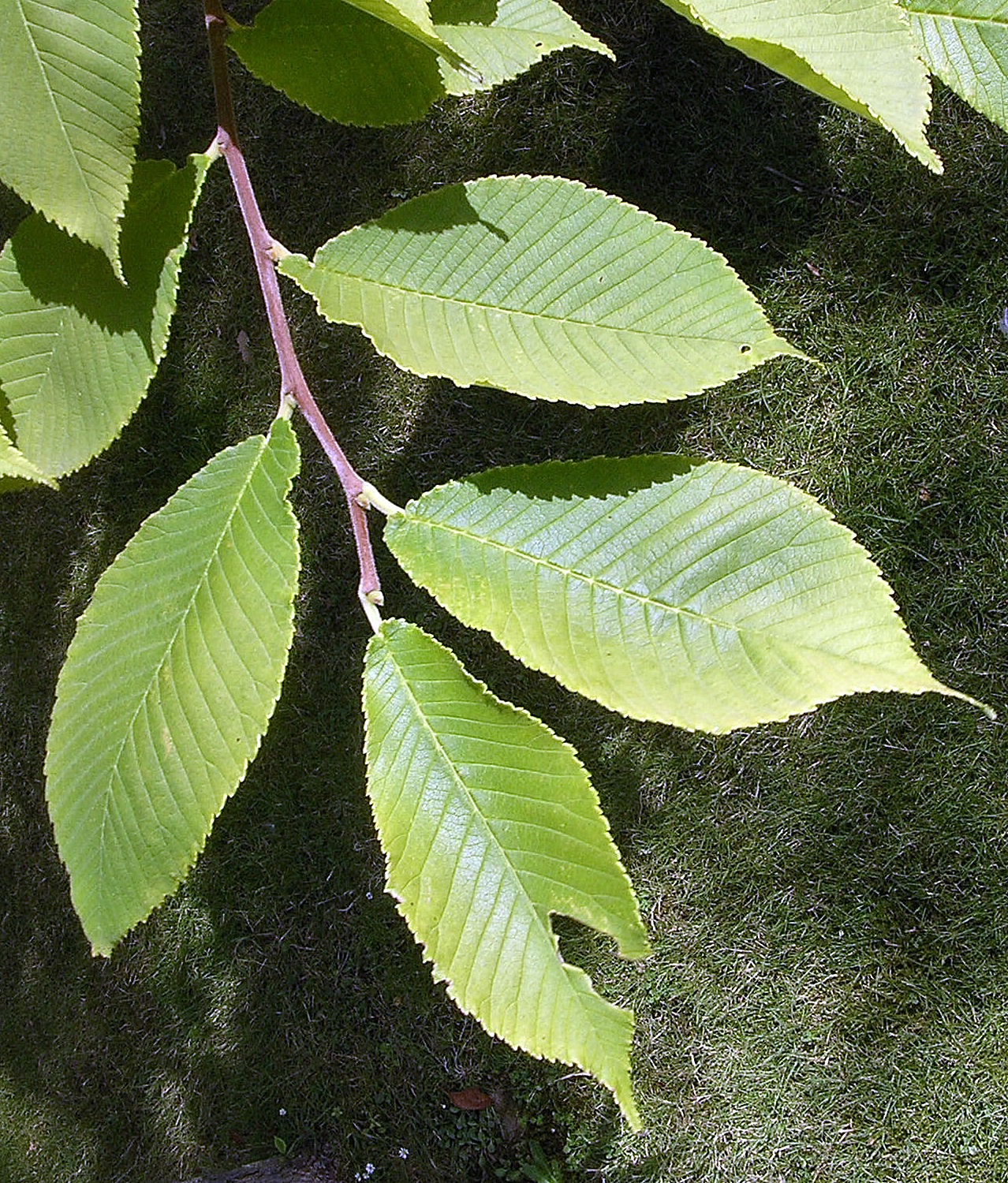

The tree can reach a height of 18 m, but is usually less than 10 m, with a spreading umbrella-like crown. The leaves, dark red on emergence, are generally obovate < 9 cm long by 5 cm broad, borne on branchlets with an irregular corky layer. The wind-pollinated apetalous flowers are produced on second-year shoots in February, followed in March by suborbicular samarae < 16 mm long by 13 mm wide.

== Pests and diseases ==
Ulmus szechuanica was evaluated with other Chinese elms at the Morton Arboretum, Illinois, where it exhibited a resistance to Dutch elm disease. The species is eschewed by the elm leaf beetle Xanthogaleruca luteola.

== Cultivation ==
Growing best on well-drained soils, U. szechuanica is cold hardy; in artificial freezing tests at the Morton Arboretum the LT50 (temp. at which 50% of tissues die) was found to be −30 °C. However, it was also found to be comparatively weak-wooded, making it susceptible to storm damage in winter. There are no known cultivars of this taxon, nor is it known to be in commerce beyond the United States.

== Hybrid cultivars ==
U. szechuanica is believed to have been used in post-2000 hybridization experiments at the Morton Arboretum.

== Accessions ==
North America

- Brenton Arboretum, Iowa, US. No accession details available.
- Chicago Botanic Garden, Illinois, US. 2 trees, no other details available.
- Dawes Arboretum, Newark, Ohio, US. 2 trees, accession numbers 2001-1137.002, 2001-1137.001.
- Denver Botanic Gardens, US. No details available
- Holden Arboretum, US. Acc. nos. 96-179 (unknown provenance), 97-30 wild collected in China.
- Morton Arboretum, US. Acc. nos. 429–84, 53–95.
- United States National Arboretum Washington, D.C., US. Acc. nos. 68987, 68991, 76235, 76236, 76250, 68992.

Europe

- Grange Farm Arboretum, Lincolnshire, UK. Acc. no. 523
- Sir Harold Hillier Gardens, Hampshire, UK. Acc. no. 1994.0329, one tree, 4.4 m tall in 2008, from seed from the Shanghai Botanical Garden

== Nurseries ==
North America

- Sun Valley Garden Centre, Eden Prairie, Minnesota, US.

Europe

- Pan-Global Plants , Frampton-on-Severn, Gloucestershire, UK.
- Pépinière AOBA , Saint Ouen la Rouerie, France.
