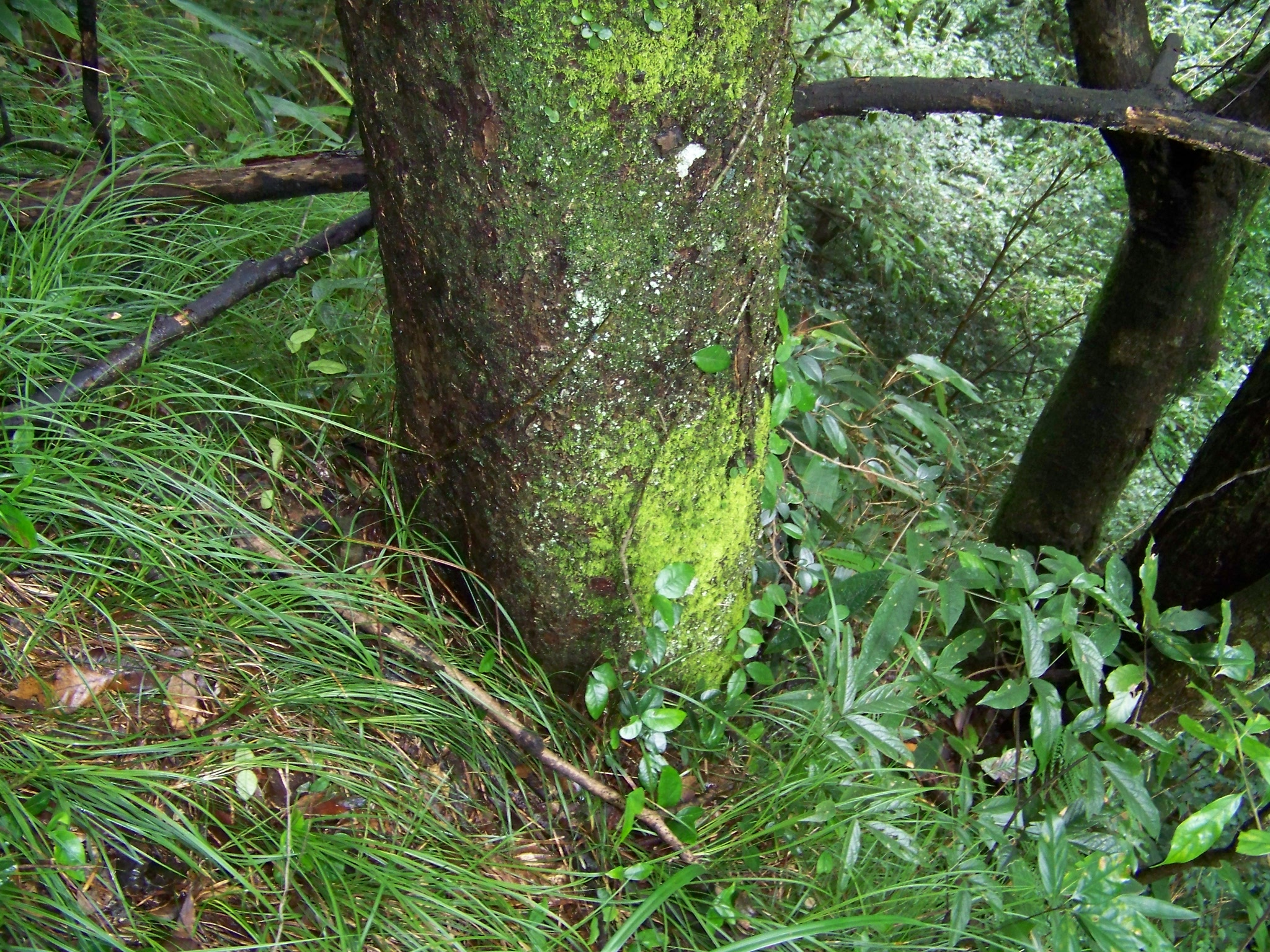

Conservation status
- Vulnerable (IUCN 2.3)

Scientific classification
- Kingdom: Plantae
- Clade: Tracheophytes
- Clade: Angiosperms
- Clade: Eudicots
- Clade: Rosids
- Order: Rosales
- Family: Ulmaceae
- Genus: Ulmus
- Subgenus: U. subg. Oreoptelea
- Section: U. sect. Chaetoptelea
- Species: U. elongata

Binomial name
- Ulmus elongata L. K. Fu & C. S. Ding

= Ulmus elongata =

Species of tree

Ulmus elongata, also known as the long raceme elm in the US, is a deciduous tree endemic to broadleaf forests in the eastern provinces of China.

== Description ==
The tree grows to a height of < 30 m and trunk < 0.8 m d.b.h. The bark is a brownish grey, and exfoliates in flakes. The coarse leaves are < 20 cm long, narrowly elliptic with an acuminate apex and borne on twigs that occasionally feature corky wings. The wind-pollinated apetalous flowers appear on the second-year twigs in February. The samarae are distinctively shuttle-shaped, < 25 mm in length, on stalks < 22 mm long, and appear in March.

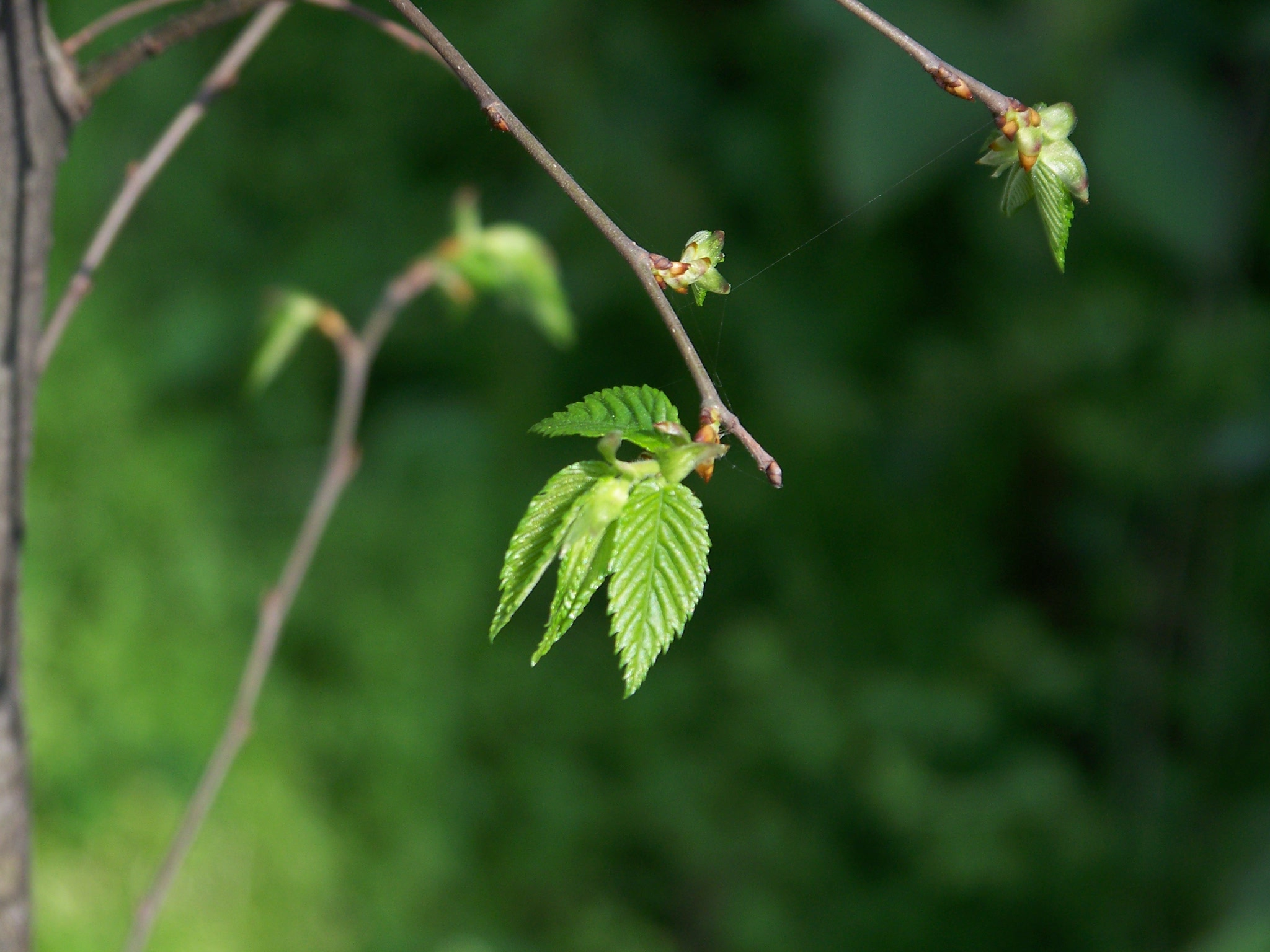
Emergent leaves of U. elongata

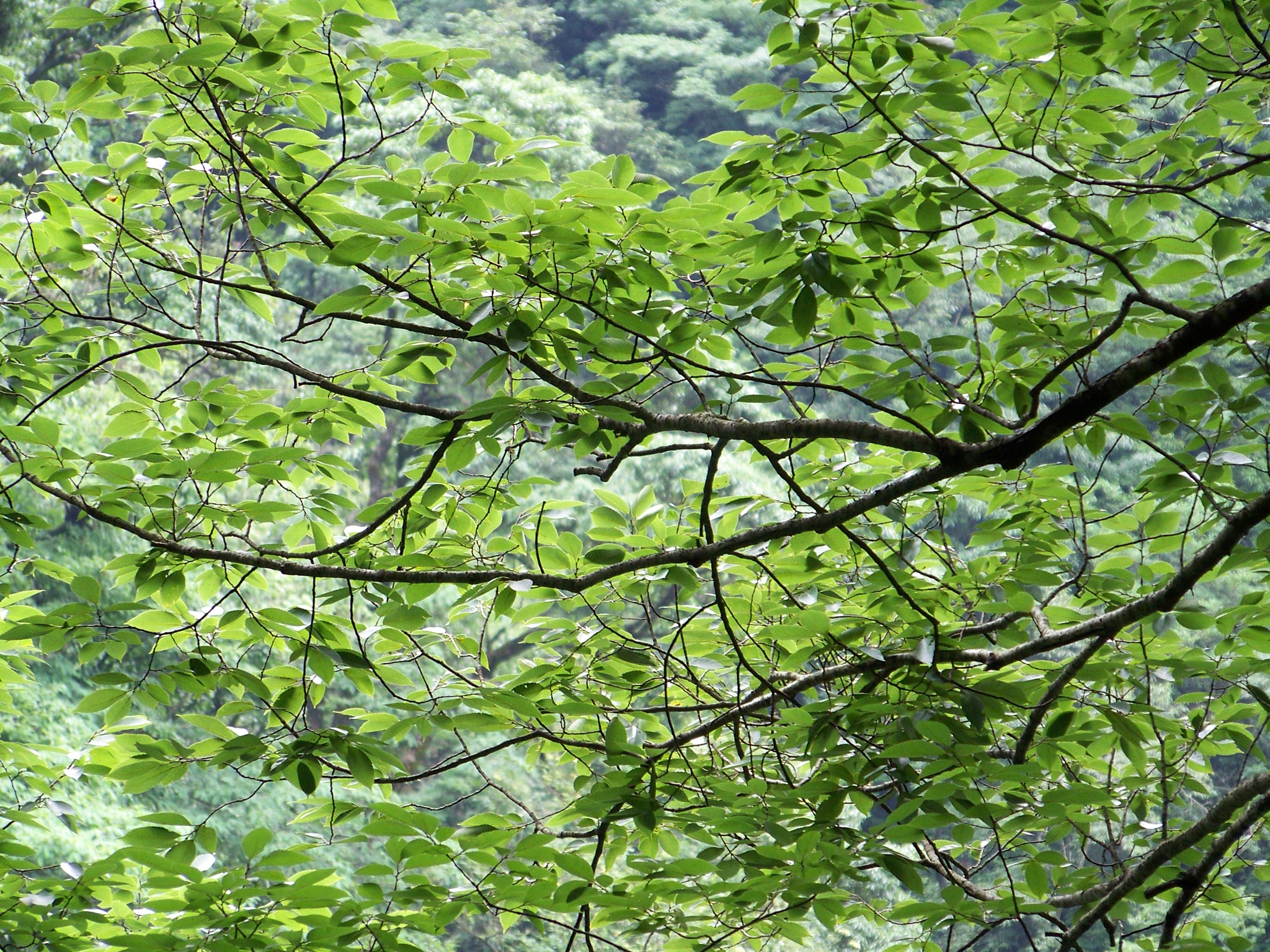
Branches of U. elongata at Gutianshan, China.

== Pests and diseases ==
No information available.

== Cultivation ==
The species was virtually unknown in the West until it was introduced to the Morton Arboretum, Illinois, in the 1990s as part of an evaluation of Chinese elms for landscape use. . Some of the seedlings raised at the Morton Arboretum were donated to the U S National Arboretum (USNA) in Washington, where two have prospered. The species is not known (2018) in Europe or Australasia. U. elongata is not known to be in commerce, and there are no known cultivars.

== Accessions ==
=== North America ===
- United States National Arboretum, Washington, D.C., US. Two trees, germinated at the Morton Arboretum from seed sent from China. Acc. nos. 68995, 55393.
- Morton Arboretum, US. Two clonally propagated trees. Acc. no. 196-2011
