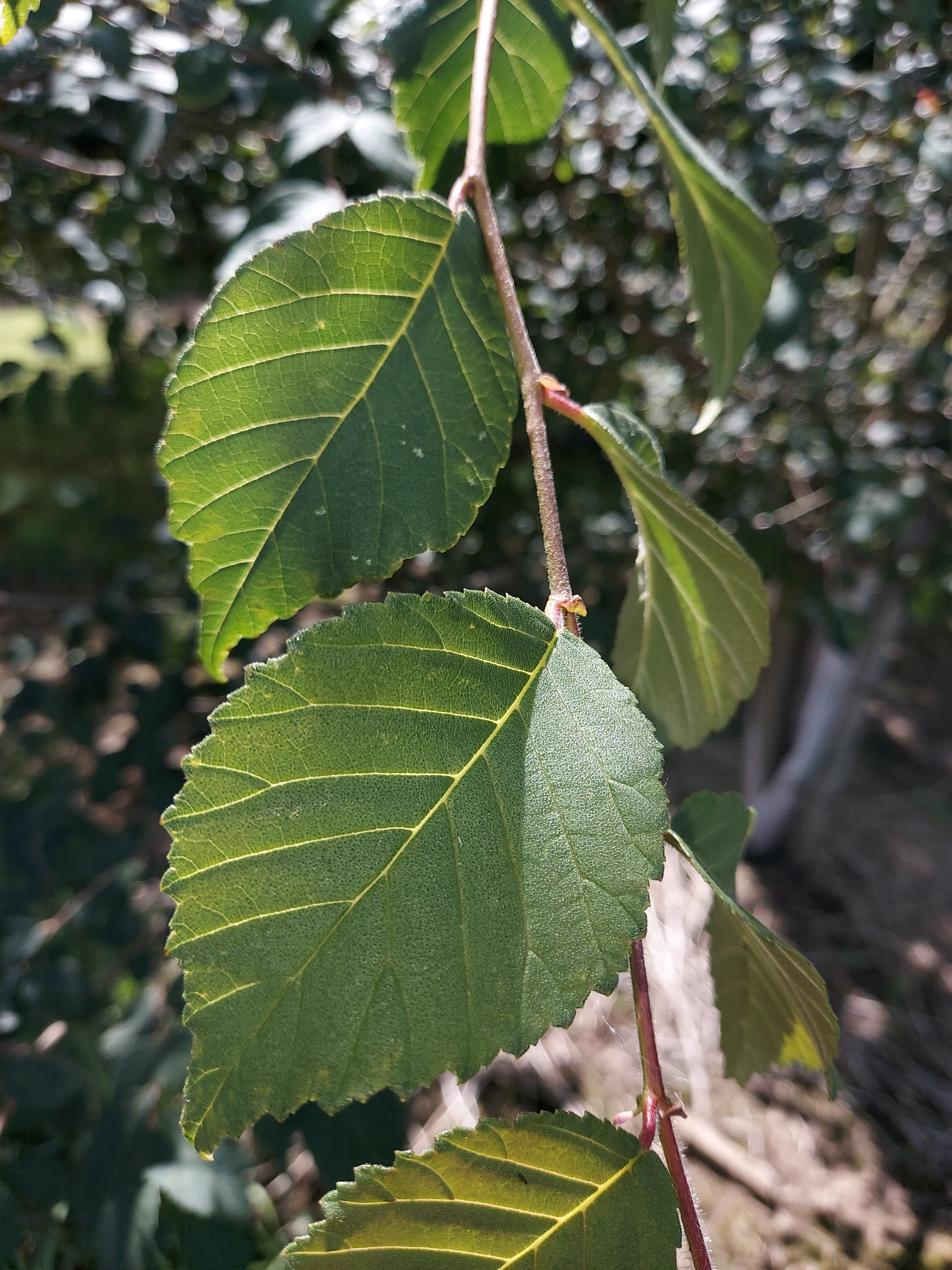
- Harbin elm leaves

Scientific classification
- Kingdom: Plantae
- Clade: Tracheophytes
- Clade: Angiosperms
- Clade: Eudicots
- Clade: Rosids
- Order: Rosales
- Family: Ulmaceae
- Genus: Ulmus
- Species: U. harbinensis

Binomial name
- Ulmus harbinensis Nie & Huang

= Ulmus harbinensis =

Species of tree

Ulmus harbinensis Nie & Huang, also known as the Harbin elm, is a small elm found only in the province of Heilongjiang in the northeastern extremity of China, where it occurs in mixed forest.

== Description ==
A robust, sturdy tree which can reach a height of < 15 m, with a slender trunk of 0.3 m d.b.h. The bark is irregularly but finely fissured. The wing-less glabrous branchlets bear small, obovate, coarsely pubescent leaves < 5.5 cm long by 3.5 cm broad. The wind-pollinated apetalous flowers appear in April; the generally orbicular samarae in June.

== Pests and diseases ==
No information available.

== Cultivation ==
The tree is very rare in cultivation.
