= Ulmus davidiana var. davidiana =

Scientific classification
- Kingdom: Plantae
- Clade: Tracheophytes
- Clade: Angiosperms
- Clade: Eudicots
- Clade: Rosids
- Order: Rosales
- Family: Ulmaceae
- Genus: Ulmus
- Species: U. davidiana Planch.
- Variety: U. d. var. davidiana

Trinomial name
- Ulmus davidiana var. davidiana

Synonyms
- Ulmus davidiana var. mandshurica Svortsov; Ulmus davidiana var. pubescens Svortsov

Variety of tree

Ulmus davidiana var. davidiana is variety of elm. The tree is restricted to the Chinese provinces of Hebei, Henan, Shaanxi and Shanxi.

== Description ==
The tree has "Bark pale grey to grey. Samara densely pubescent on seed. Fl. and fr. March - May." The pubescence over the seed distinguishes var. davidiana from var. japonica.

== Pests and diseases ==
No information available, but Ulmus davidiana has a moderate, 3 out of 5 resistance.

== Cultivation ==
The tree is very rare in cultivation beyond China.

== Accessions ==
=== North America ===
- U S National Arboretum , Washington, D.C., United States. (Listed under synonym U. davidiana var. mandshurica) Acc. nos. 76223, 68982.

== Nurseries ==
Europe

- Pan-global Plants , Frampton on Severn, Gloucestershire, UK
