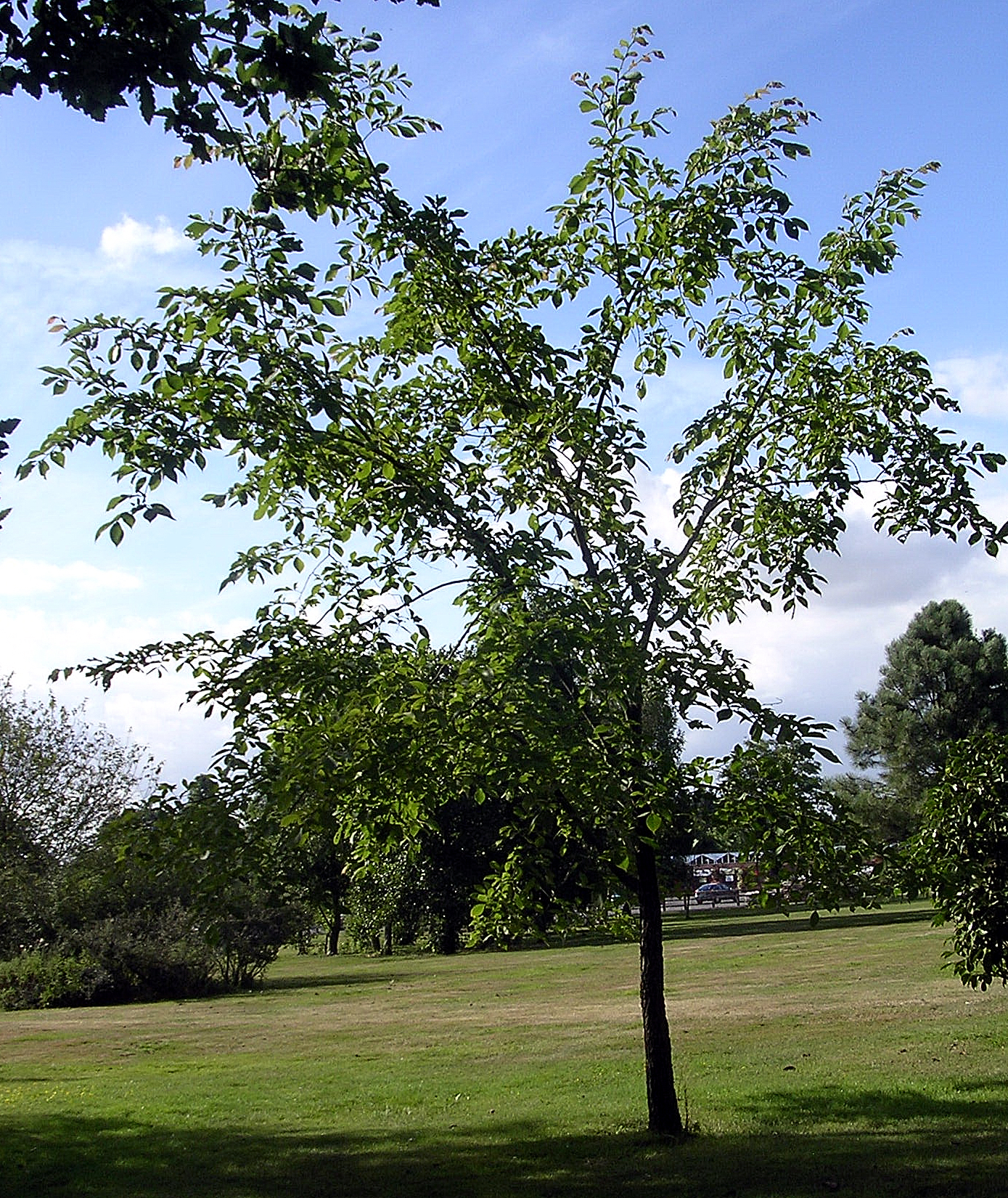
- Chestnut-leafed elm aged 15 years, Sir Harold Hillier Gardens, UK

Conservation status
- Least Concern (IUCN 3.1)

Scientific classification
- Kingdom: Plantae
- Clade: Tracheophytes
- Clade: Angiosperms
- Clade: Eudicots
- Clade: Rosids
- Order: Rosales
- Family: Ulmaceae
- Genus: Ulmus
- Species: U. castaneifolia

Binomial name
- Ulmus castaneifolia Hemsl.

Synonyms
- Ulmus ferruginea W. C. Cheng; Ulmus multinervis W. C. Cheng

= Ulmus castaneifolia =

Species of tree

Ulmus castaneifolia Hemsley, the chestnut-leafed elm or multinerved elm, is a small deciduous tree found across much of China in broadleaved forests at elevations of 500–1,600 metres (1,600–5,200 ft).

== Description ==
The tree can reach a height of 20 metres (66 ft) with a trunk of about 0.5 m d.b.h. The bark is thick with a pronounced corky layer, and is longitudinally fissured. The branchlets are devoid of the corky wings common to many elms. The leaves are generally narrow, ranging from obovate to elliptic, up to 15 cm long, and densely hirsute when young. Schneider's leaf-drawing (1907) shows a longish petiole. The perfect wind-pollinated apetalous flowers are produced on second-year shoots in February; the samarae are mostly obovate < 30 × 16 mm, with seed close to the apex.

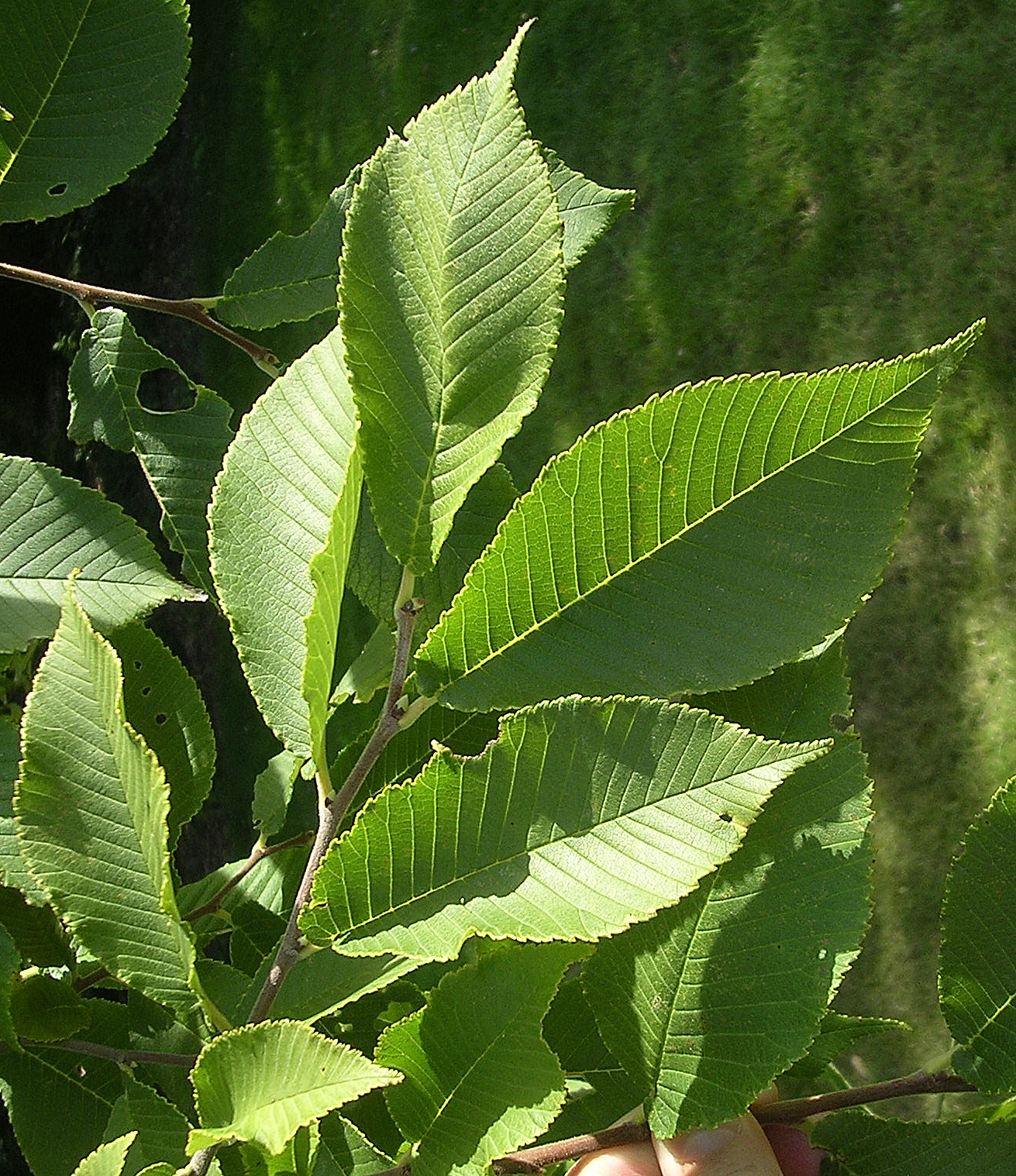
U. castaneifolia leaves, Sir Harold Hillier Gardens, UK

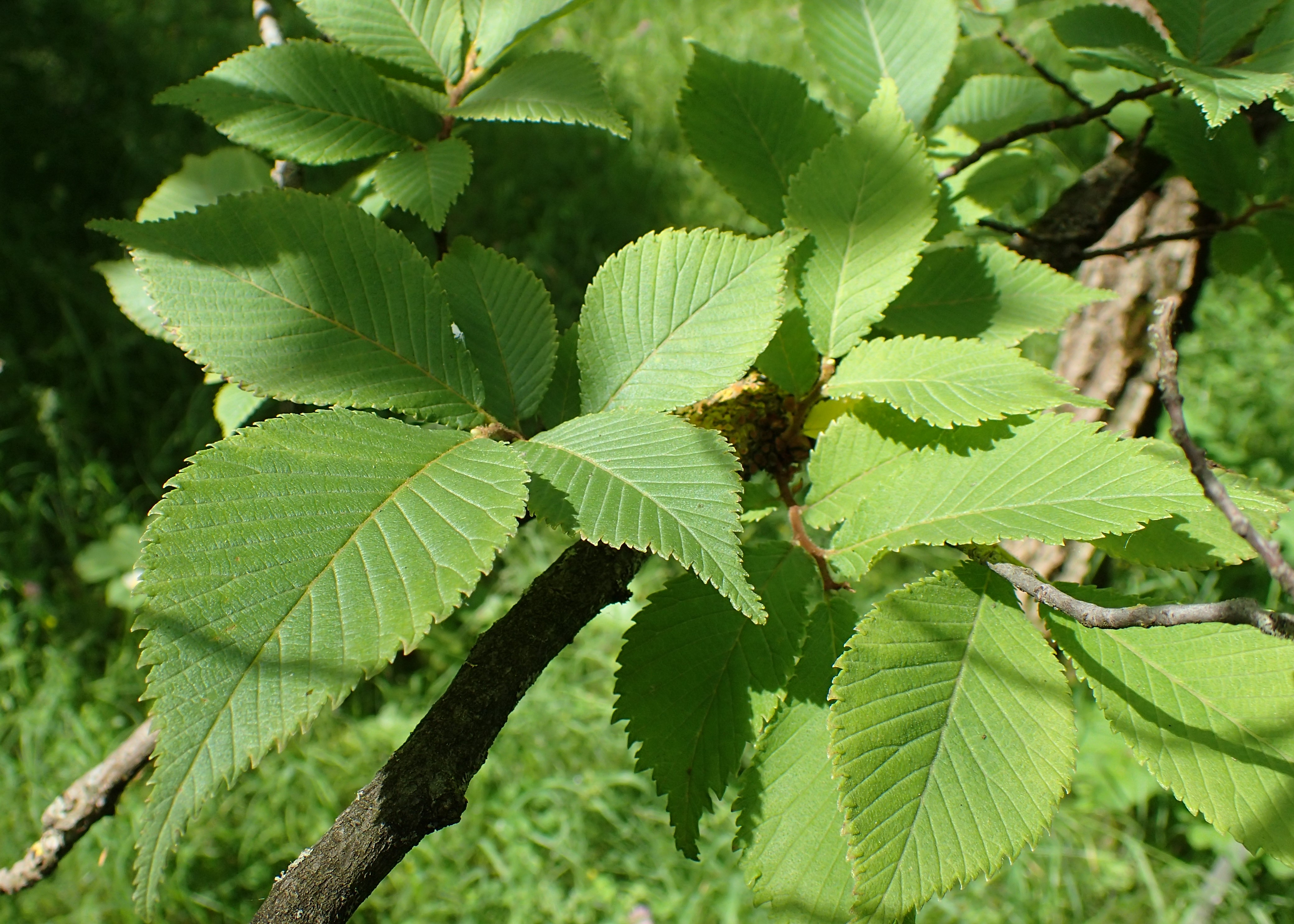
U. castaneifolia leaves in the Botanischer Garten, Berlin-Dahlem

== Pests and diseases ==
Ulmus castaneifolia is resistant to Dutch elm disease and to elm leaf beetle Xanthogaleruca luteola.

== Cultivation ==
The species is very rare in cultivation; it was one of 12 Chinese species under evaluation at the Morton Arboretum, Illinois, in 2009 by the late Dr George Ware. In artificial freezing tests at the arboretum, the LT50 (temperature at which 50% of tissues die) was found to be −26 °C. There are no known cultivars of this taxon, nor is it known to be in commerce.

== Notable trees ==
The UK TROBI champion grows at Calderstones Park, Merseyside. Another of similar dimensions grows at the Royal Botanic Gardens Kew, planted in 1973.

== Accessions ==
North America

- Chicago Botanic Garden, US. Planted in West Collections Area.
- Denver Botanic Gardens, US. Acc. details not available
- Morton Arboretum, US. Acc. no. 46–95. obtained from Yunnan Province, China.
- University of British Columbia Botanical Garden, Vancouver, British Columbia, Canada. Acc. no. 027099–0437–1989, (as U. multinervis).
- United States National Arboretum, Washington, D.C., US. Acc. nos. 76219, 68914.

Europe

- Calderstones Park, Merseyside, UK. TROBI Champion, 13 m high, 45 cm d.b.h. (2011).
- Grange Farm Arboretum, Lincolnshire, UK. Acc. no. 698.
- Hortus Botanicus Nationalis, Salaspils, Latvia. Acc. no. 18149 (as U. multinervis W. C. Cheng), from Beijing.
- Royal Botanic Gardens, Kew, UK. Acc. no. 1973–11726
- Sir Harold Hillier Gardens, UK. Acc. no. 1994.0327, area PC 700, origin not disclosed.
- Strona Arboretum, University of Life Sciences, Warsaw, Poland, (as Ulmus multinervis).
- Wijdemeren City Council, Netherlands. Elm Arboretum, 2 planted Overmeerseweg, Nederhorst den Berg in 2015.
