= Grange Farm Arboretum =

Arboretum in England

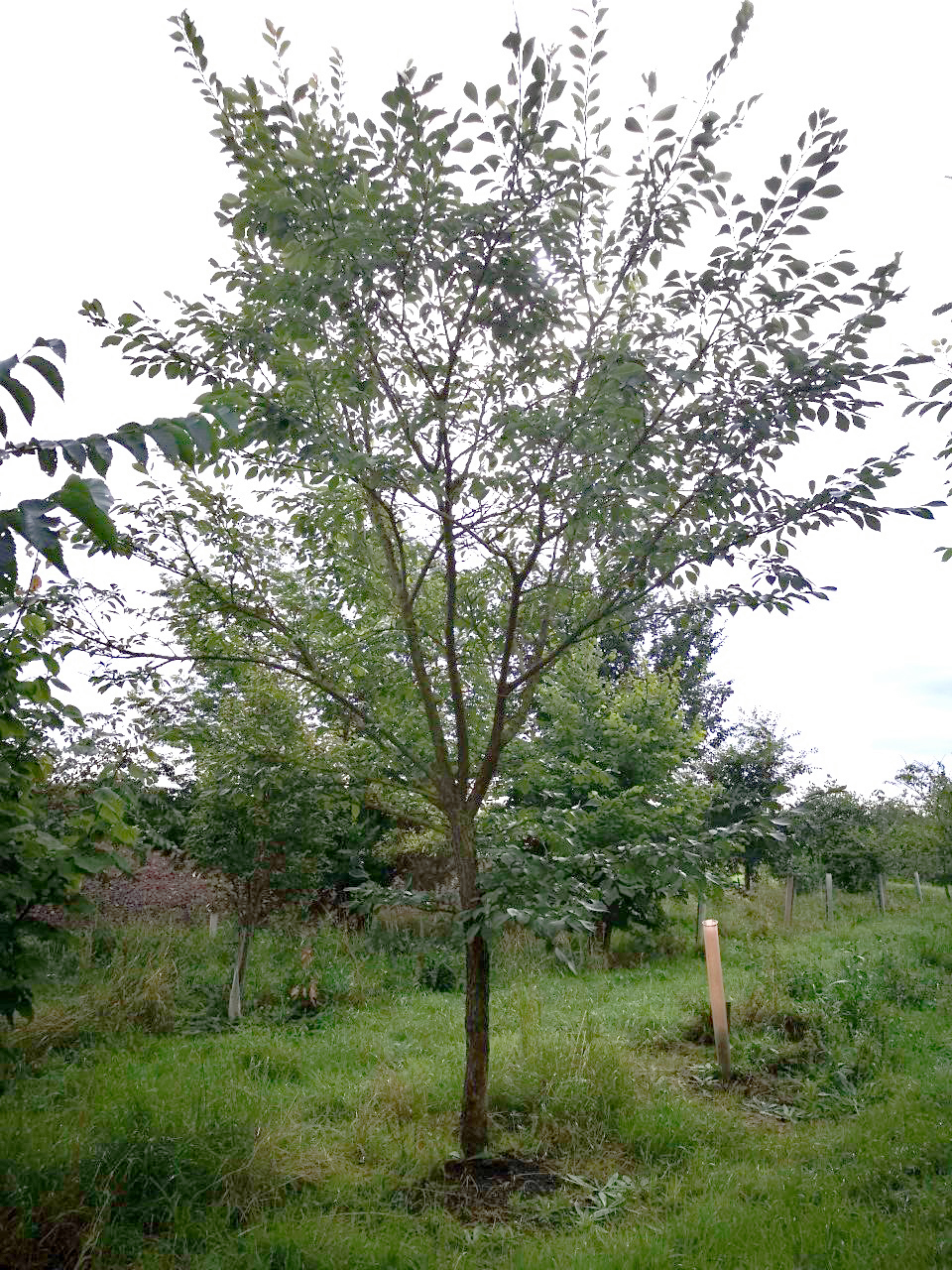
- Ulmus chenmoui at Grange Farm

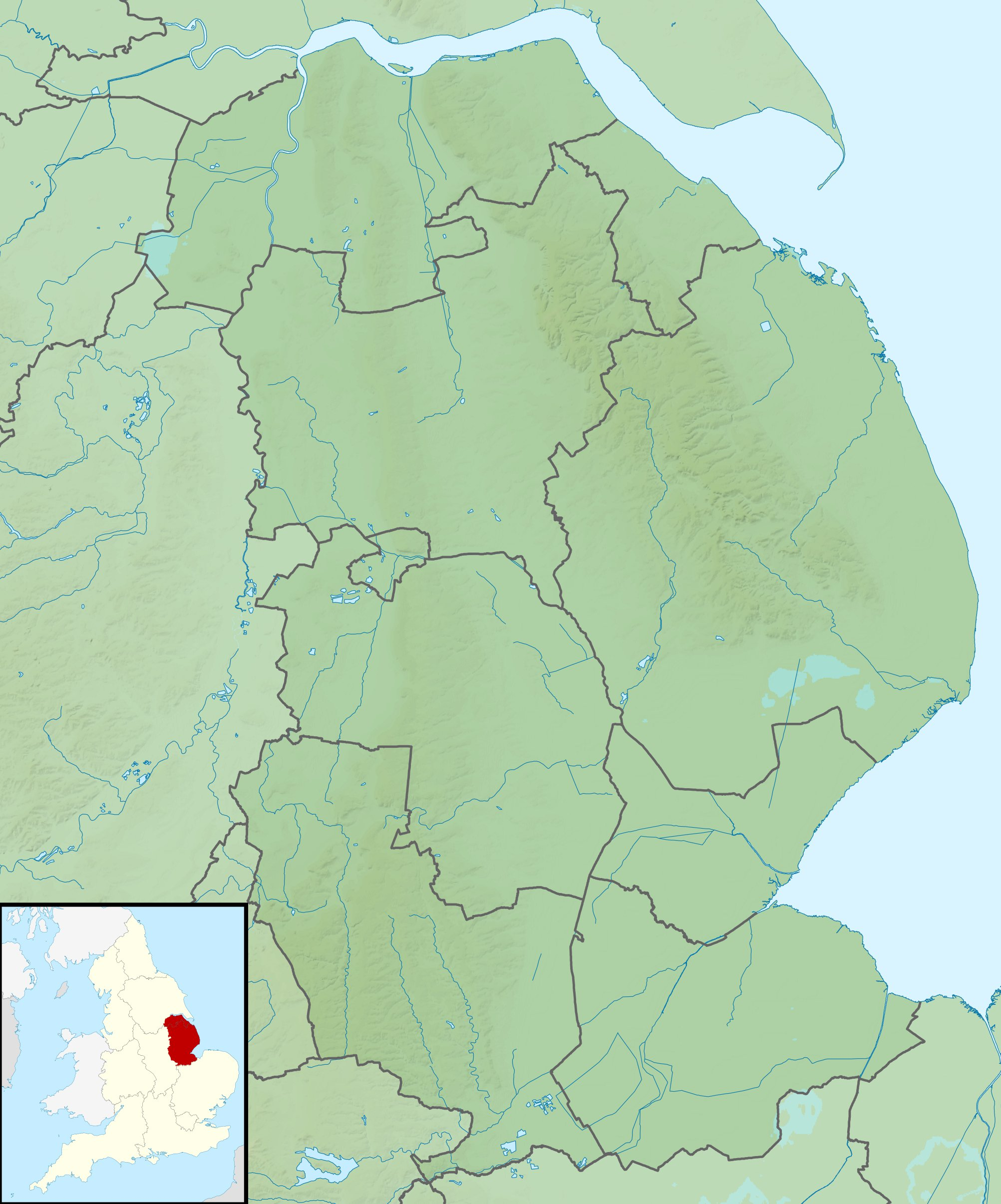
- Location within Lincolnshire
- Type: Arboretum
- Location: 1 mile (1.6 km) west of Sutton St James on the B1165
- Coordinates: 52°44′43″N 0°03′06″E
- Area: 3 hectares (0.030 km^{2})
- Created: 1987
- Operator: Matthew Ellis
- Open: By appointment
- Website: https://www.arboreta.nl/grangefarm.htm

The Grange Farm Arboretum is a small private arboretum comprising 3 hectares accommodating over 800 trees, mostly native and ornamental species or cultivars, notably oaks, ashes, walnuts and elms, growing on a calcareous loam.

The arboretum is located in the village of Sutton St James, Lincolnshire, England, and was founded by Matthew Ellis in 1987. The arboretum is open to visitors by appointment.
