= Ulmus davidiana var. japonica 'Thomson' =

Elm cultivar

- Variety: Ulmus davidiana var. japonica
- Cultivar: 'Thomson'
- Origin: PFRA Nursery, Saskatchewan, Canada

Ulmus davidiana var. japonica 'Thomson' is a hardy, cold-resistant cultivar of the Japanese Elm assessed by the Prairie Farm Rehabilitation Administration (PFRA) Nursery (now the AAFC-PFRA&E Shelterbelt Centre) at Indian Head, Saskatchewan, in the 1970s as part of its shelterbelt tree research..

The tree was one of a number of Japanese Elms planted in an experimental shelterbelt at Indian Head in 1953. These shelterbelt trees were derived from seed taken from two openly pollinated Japanese Elms obtained from Manchuria and planted at Indian Head in 1929. 'Thomson' attained a height of 8 m in 25 years, a rather modest performance compared with Siberian Elm Ulmus pumila and American elm Ulmus americana grown at the same site. Nevertheless, the tree has proved exceptionally hardy.

== Description ==
'Thomson' is distinguished by a single trunk bearing a vase-shaped crown, the branches forming strong wide-angled crotches; the bark is dark grey and deeply fissured. The twigs have diamond-shaped fissures that become more apparent on second-year wood, and occasionally sport corky wings. The leaves are borne on 1 cm petioles, and average 7.5 cm in length, obovate to elliptic, with the typical acuminate apex and oblique base; dark green and glabrous, they turn bright yellow in autumn. The samarae are obovate and deeply notched at the apex.

The species does not sucker from roots.

== Pests and diseases ==
'Thomson' displayed a resistance to Dutch elm disease when inoculated by Dr E. S. Kondo of the Canadian Forest Service (CFS) in Sault Ste. Marie; the original tree still survives (2008) and has also proven resistant to elm leaf beetle Xanthogaleruca luteola. Moreover, the tree's foliage was adjudged "resistant" to black spot by the Plant Diagnostic Clinic of the University of Missouri.

== Cultivation ==
The tree was usually propagated by grafting on Siberian Elm seedlings. Released for sale in Saskatchewan in 1980, 'Thomson' is no longer in commerce owing to restrictions imposed by the Canadian government on the movement of elms across the country, which severely limited its potential market. 'Thomson' was introduced to the UK in 1980, one of three Canadian cultivars (the others 'Jacan' and 'Mitsui Centennial') imported by the London office of Mitsui & Co. to commemorate the company's centenary. The trees were distributed to Brighton & Hove City Council and the Sir Harold Hillier Gardens (SHHG). However, no record of the planting of 'Thomson' survives; one tree at SHHG was incorrectly labelled simply as 'Mitsui' for 30 years, and could possibly be 'Thomson'.

== Synonymy ==
- 'Thompson': In error for 'Thomson'.

== Etymology ==
The tree was named for Mr W. B. Thomson, appointed director of PFRA in 1973.

== Accessions ==
North America

- Royal Botanical Gardens, Burlington, Ontario; one tree, planted c.1980.
