= Ulmus davidiana var. japonica 'Mitsui Centennial' =

Elm cultivar

- Variety: Ulmus davidiana var. japonica
- Cultivar: 'Mitsui Centennial'
- Origin: Canada

The Japanese Elm cultivar Ulmus davidiana var. japonica 'Mitsui Centennial' is a cold-resistant selection raised at the Morden Experimental Station, Manitoba, Canada, in the 1970s, originally for use in the prairie regions. The tree was named to mark the centenary in 1980 of Mitsui & Co. and was one of three Japanese elm cultivars sourced from Canada (the others 'Jacan' and 'Thomson') donated to the UK in that year by the company's London office.

== Description ==
Similar in appearance to 'Jacan'. The species does not sucker from roots.

== Pests and diseases ==
The tree is more resistant to Dutch elm disease than 'Jacan', and is also resistant to elm leaf beetle Xanthogaleruca luteola .

== Cultivation ==
Largely restricted to Canada, 'Mitsui Centennial' is represented in Europe by two specimens at the Sir Harold Hillier Gardens in Hampshire, England, and a grove planted near the Parsee Fountain on Broadwalk, Regents Park, London. Another was later propagated from a cutting by the Grange Farm Arboretum in Lincolnshire.

== Accessions ==
North America

- Dominion Arboretum, Ottawa, Ontario, Canada. No acc. details.

Europe

- Grange Farm Arboretum, Sutton St James, Spalding, UK. Acc. no. not known.
- Sir Harold Hillier Gardens, Ampfield, UK. Acc. nos. 1981.0134, 1982.0113
