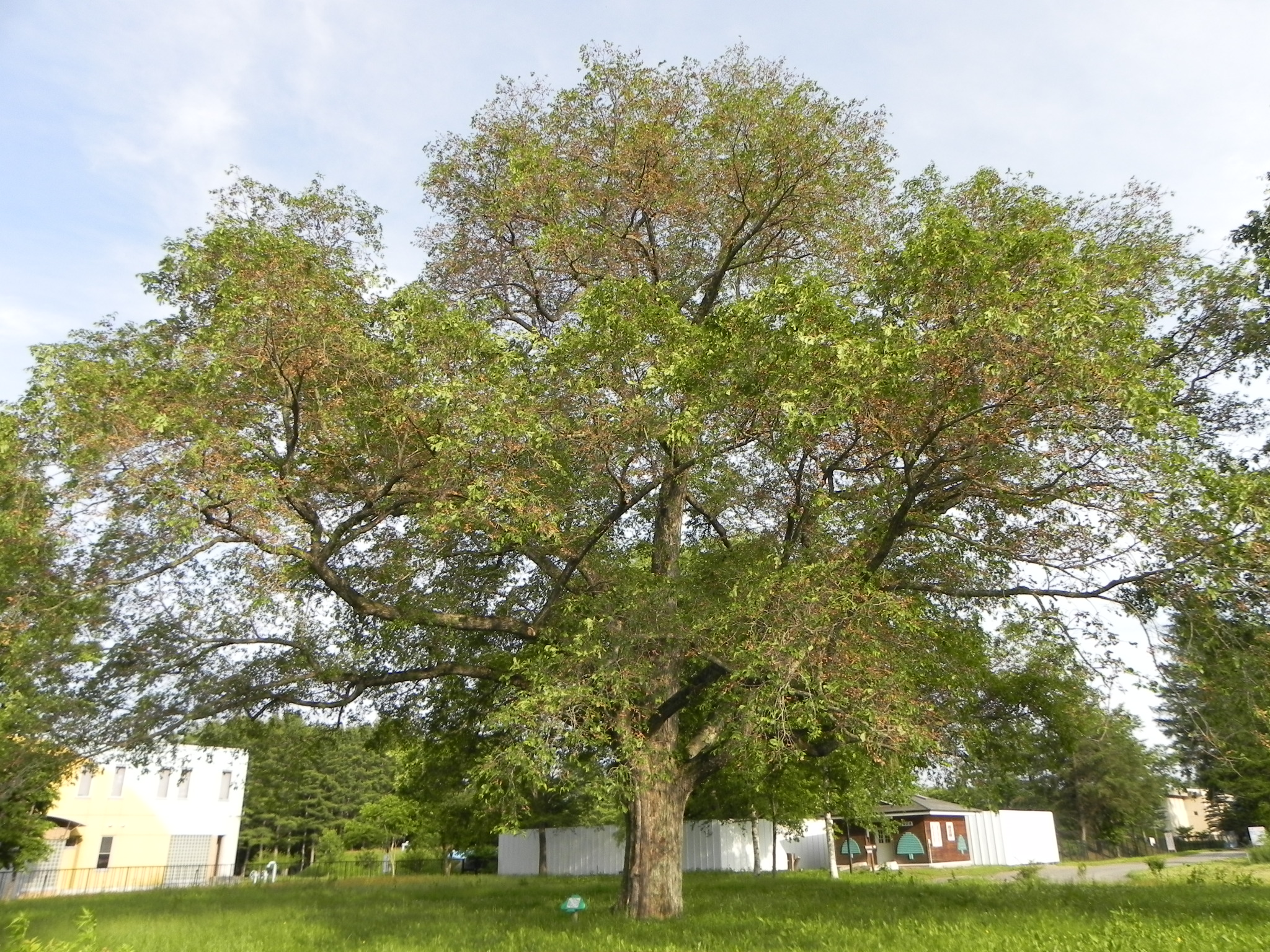
- Ulmus davidiana var. japonica, Obihiro, Hokkaido, Japan

Scientific classification
- Kingdom: Plantae
- Clade: Embryophytes
- Clade: Tracheophytes
- Clade: Spermatophytes
- Clade: Angiosperms
- Clade: Eudicots
- Clade: Rosids
- Order: Rosales
- Family: Ulmaceae
- Genus: Ulmus
- Species: U. davidiana
- Variety: U. d. var. japonica

Trinomial name
- Ulmus davidiana var. japonica Rehder

Synonyms
- Ulmus campestris Komarov; Ulmus campestris L. var. japonica Rehder; Ulmus campestris var. laevis Fr. Schmidt; Ulmus campestris var. vulgaris Shirasawa; Ulmus davidiana var. levigata (C. K. Schneid.), Nakai; Ulmus davidiana var. japonica f. suberosa Nakai; Ulmus japonica (Rehder), Sarg.; Ulmus japonica var. levigata C. K. Schneid.; Ulmus propinqua Koidz.; Ulmus wilsoniana C. K. Schneid.

= Ulmus davidiana var. japonica =

Variety of tree

Ulmus davidiana var. japonica, the Japanese elm, is one of the larger and more graceful Asiatic elms, endemic to much of continental northeast Asia and Japan, where it grows in swamp forest on young alluvial soils, although much of this habitat has now been lost to intensive rice cultivation.

== Classification ==
Some authorities do not consider japonica to be a variety of Ulmus davidiana, The Illustrated Flora of the Primorsky Territory, Russian Far East (2019), for example, maintaining U. japonica as a species.

== Description ==
The size and shape of the Japanese elm is extremely variable, ranging from short and bearing a densely branched broad crown similar to the Wych elm to tall, single-stemmed, with narrow crown similar to the English elm. Augustine Henry described one of the latter outside Iwamigawa, Hokkaido, railway station as being 34 m tall, with a clean stem to a height of approximately 15 m. Takenoshin Nakai distinguished a local cork-barked form, f. suberosa (Flora of Japan, 1965), while Morton Arboretum, Illinois, distinguishes a cork-barked form from China, U. propinqua var. suberosa. A smooth-leaved form, f. kijimae, was originally named U. kijimae. Japanese elm is distinguished by the fawn colour of shoots at the end of their first season, the shoots often being roughened by minute tubercles or 'warts'. The young shoots often bear corky wings, similar to those of the European field elm U. minor, to which it is closely related.

The leaves are generally obovate, < 11 cm long, with a petiole about 10mm long. Like many of the European field elms, var. japonica retains its green foliage well into the autumn, before a late display of deep yellow. Schneider (1907) and Bean noted that the variety from western China, formerly known as U. wilsoniana, has 16 to 22 pairs of leaf-veins, while the eastern type tree has not more than 16. The perfect, apetalous wind-pollinated flowers emerge in early spring, before the leaves. The samara, <15 mm long, is obovate to orbicular, occasionally hairy over its entire surface but more often glabrous, the seed touching the notch, the inner margins of which are ciliate, the stigmas being slightly incurved. Trees grown from seed at Great Fontley in southern England first flowered aged 13 years. The species does not sucker from roots.

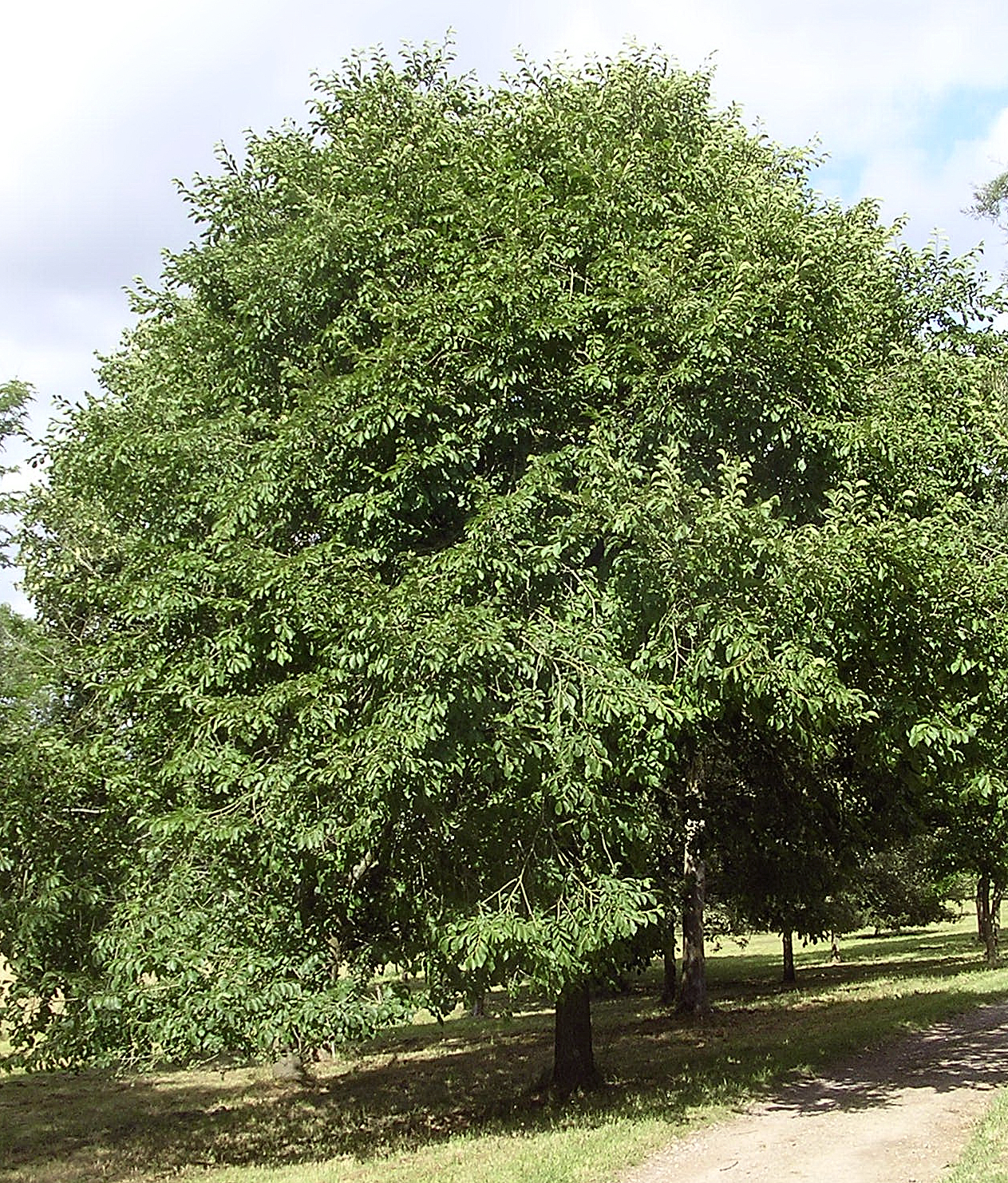
Japanese elm, showing pendulous habit of lower branchlets. SHHG, Romsey, UK

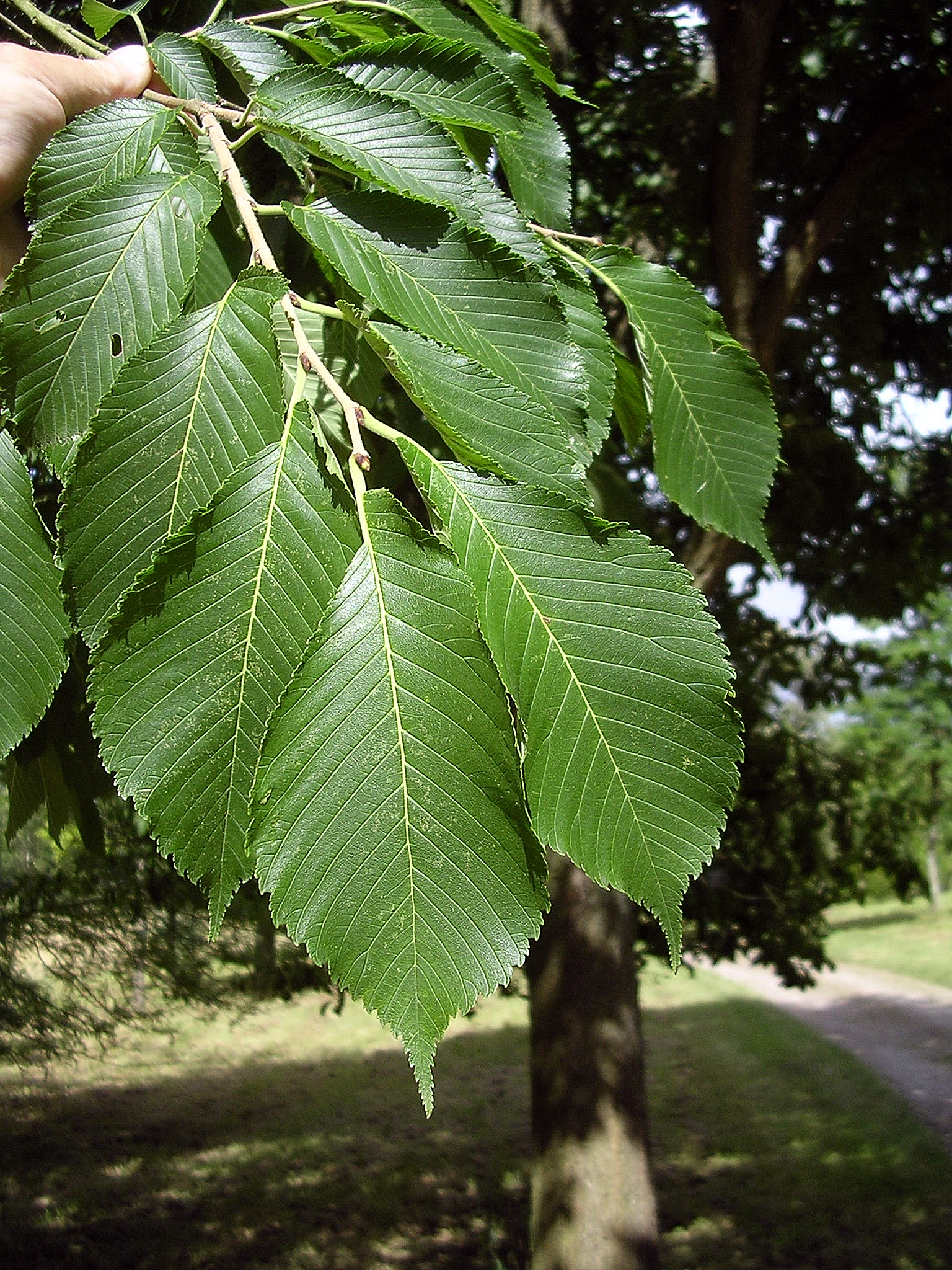
Japanese Elm leaves

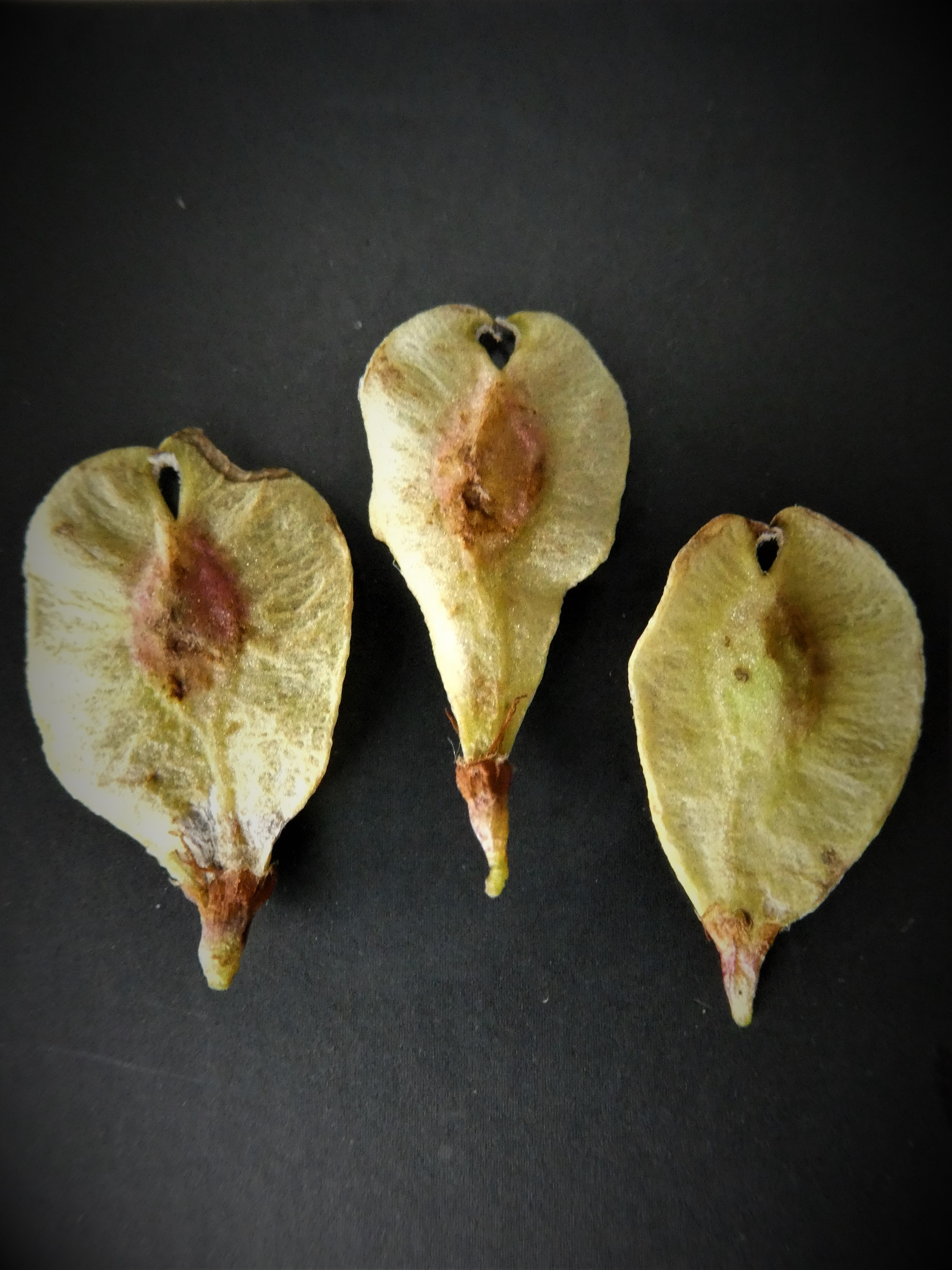
Samarae

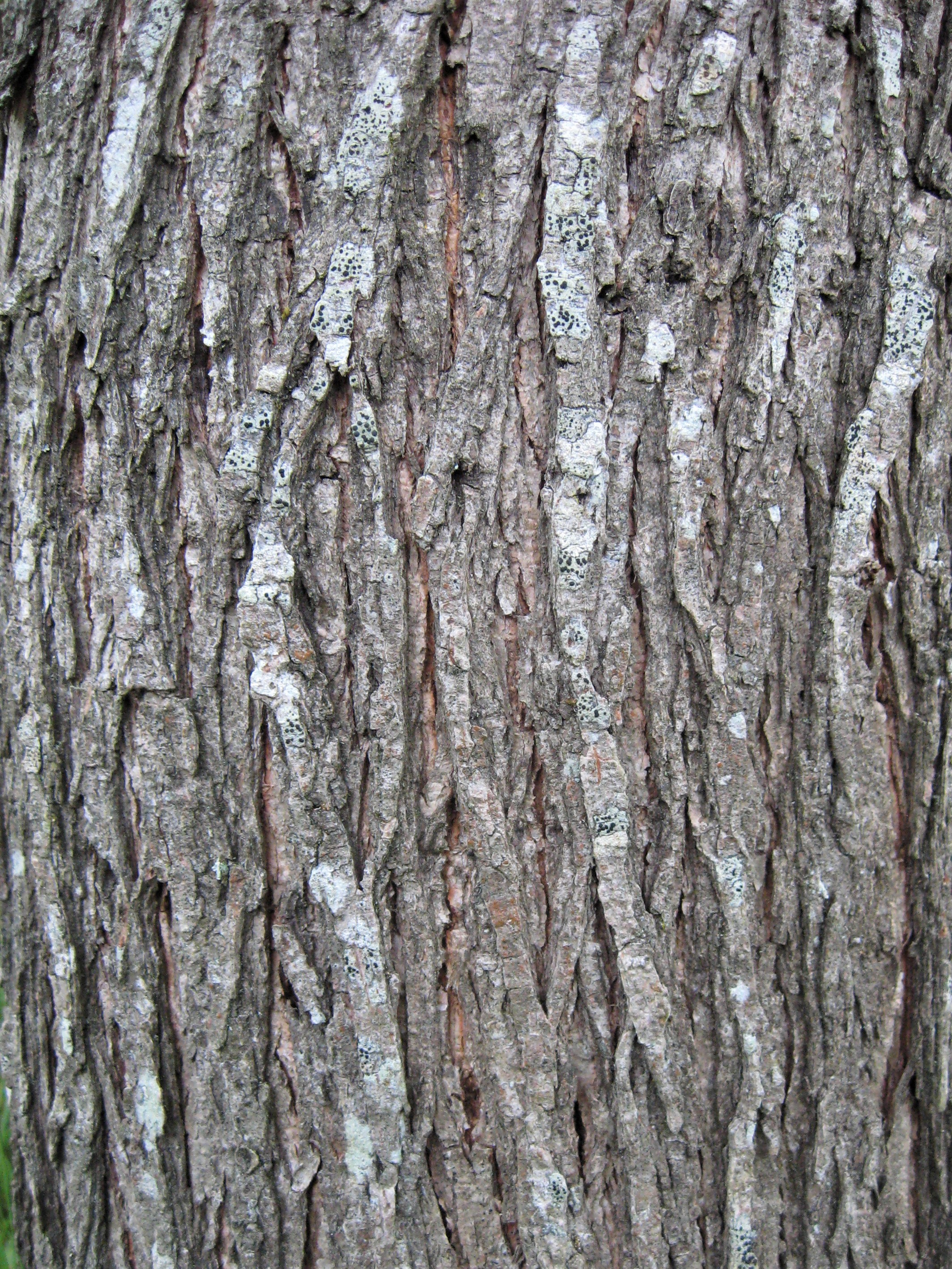
Bark of 30-year-old tree

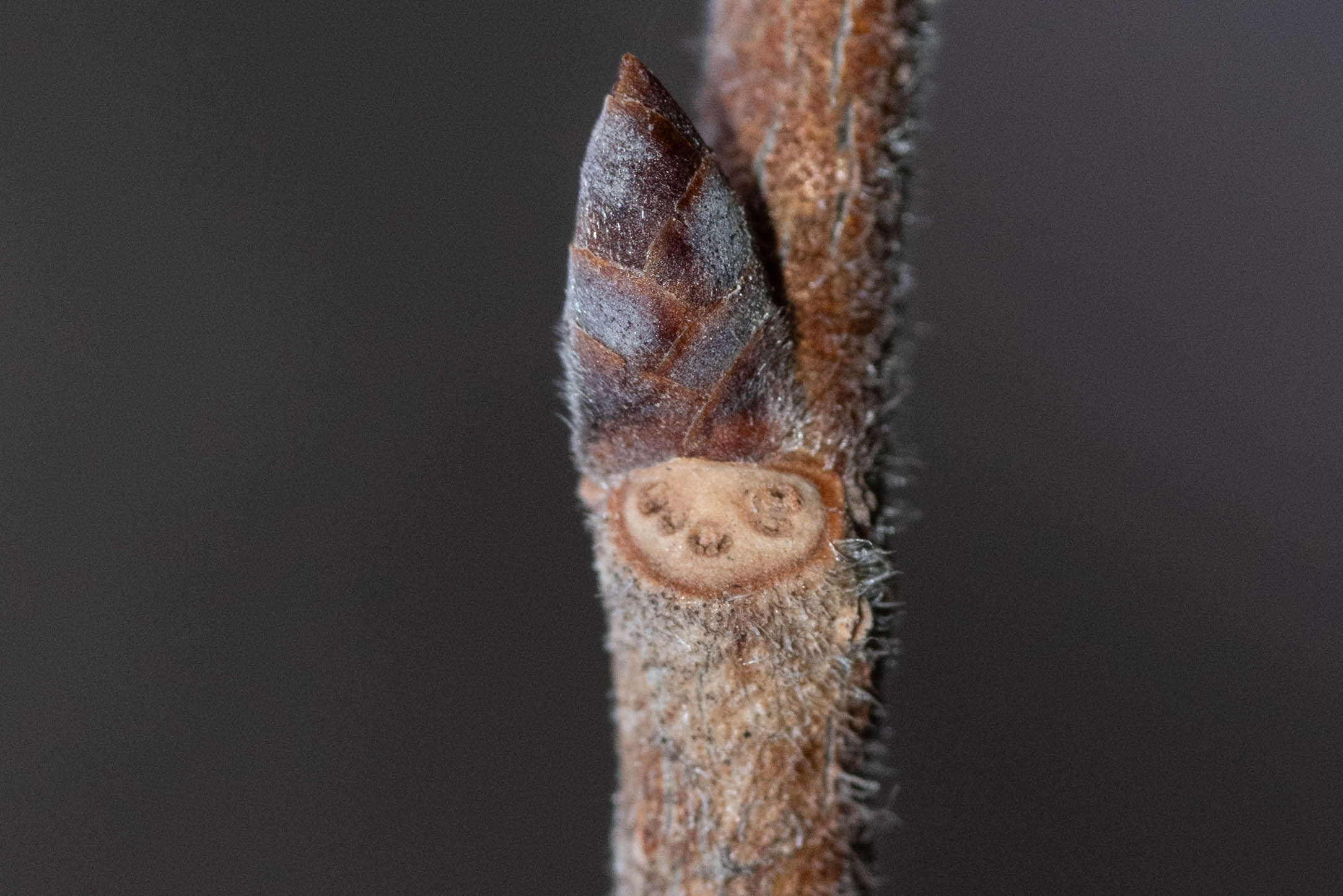
Winter bud with leaf scar

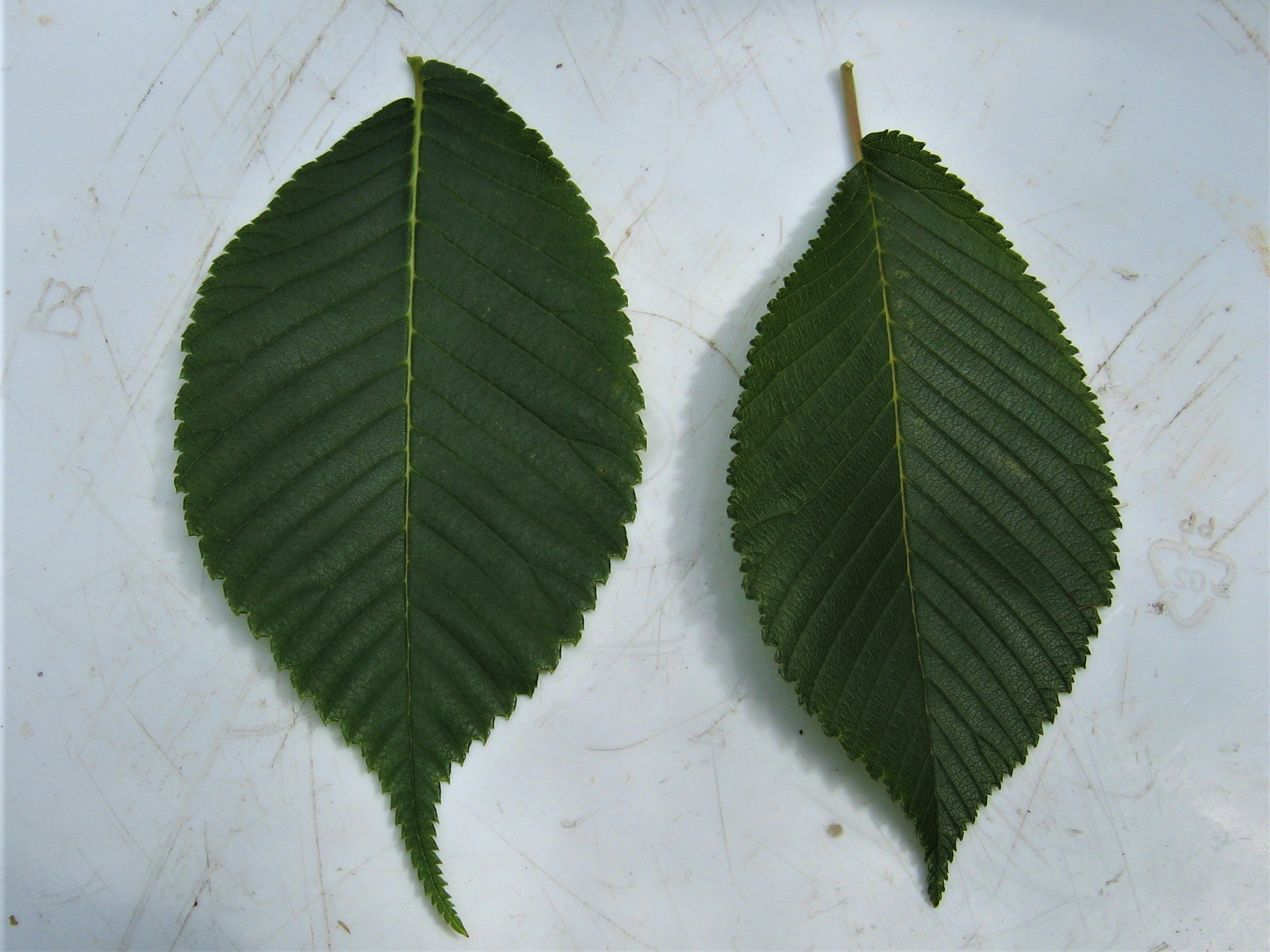
Ulmus uyematsui leaf (left, at Great Fontley) and Japanese Elm leaf (right)

== Pests and diseases ==
Natural populations of Japanese elm have a low to moderate resistance to Dutch elm disease. In trials in the Netherlands, susceptibility to disease was found to be commensurate with rate of growth, the more vigorous specimens exhibiting far more foliar damage after inoculation with the causal fungus. Careful selection in North America has produced a number of cultivars highly resistant to disease (see Hybrids, hybrid cultivars and cultivars below). The tree is resistant to the elm leaf beetle Xanthogaleruca luteola but is moderately susceptible to elm yellows.

== Cultivation ==
Japanese elm has been widely planted in northern Japan as a street tree. It was introduced to Arnold Arboretum, Massachusetts, in 1895 as seed sent from Sapporo by Professor Kingo Miyabe, whence two seedlings were donated to Kew Gardens, London, in 1897. The Späth nursery, Berlin, marketed Japanese elm in Europe from 1900, Kew obtaining a third specimen from them in that year. Specimens were supplied by Späth to the Royal Botanic Garden Edinburgh in 1903 as U. campestris japonica and may survive in Edinburgh, as it was the practice of the Garden to distribute trees about the city. A specimen of U. campestris japonica obtained from Späth stood in the Ryston Hall arboretum, Norfolk, in the early 20th century. The Arnold Arboretum specimens grew rapidly, and first flowered aged 12 years. A form from western China, for many years distinguished as U. wilsoniana Schneider, was introduced to the Arnold Arboretum in 1910. The Morton Arboretum, Illinois, has intermediate forms labelled U. japonica × U. wilsoniana. Unlike many Asiatic species, Japanese elm is tolerant of a mild, maritime climate with heavy winter rainfall and was consequently considered of potential use in the Dutch elm breeding programme led by H. M. Heybroek at the Dorschkamp Research Institute at Wageningen. In 1977, Heybroek collected the tree in Japan, with the result that there is now a small forest of Japanese elm in southern Flevoland, the largest plantation of the species beyond its native land.

The tree was briefly propagated and marketed in the UK by the Hillier & Sons nursery, Winchester, Hampshire from 1971 to 1977. Specimens planted at the Sir Harold Hillier Gardens have grown very well on heavy clay in an open location, where they support colonies of the White-letter Hairstreak Satyrium w-album. In trials elsewhere in Hampshire conducted by Butterfly Conservation, the tree also proved tolerant of dry soils on chalk and soils waterlogged in winter, although growth has been comparatively slow and leaves are late to flush, rarely before mid-May.

Leaves from the tree were eaten during the Great Chinese Famine, but found to cause facial swelling.

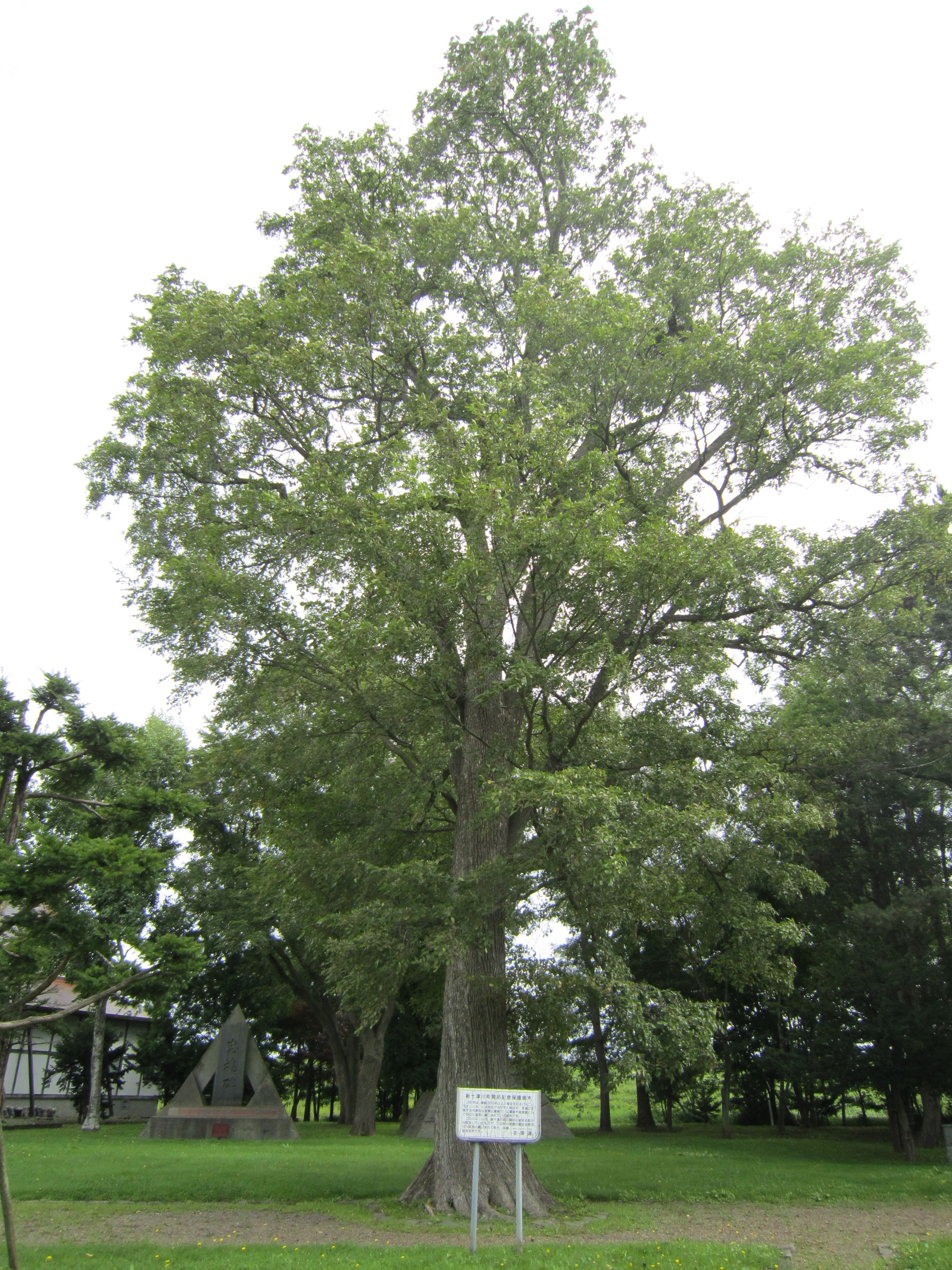
Japanese elm, Kikusui Park, Shintotsukawa (2019)

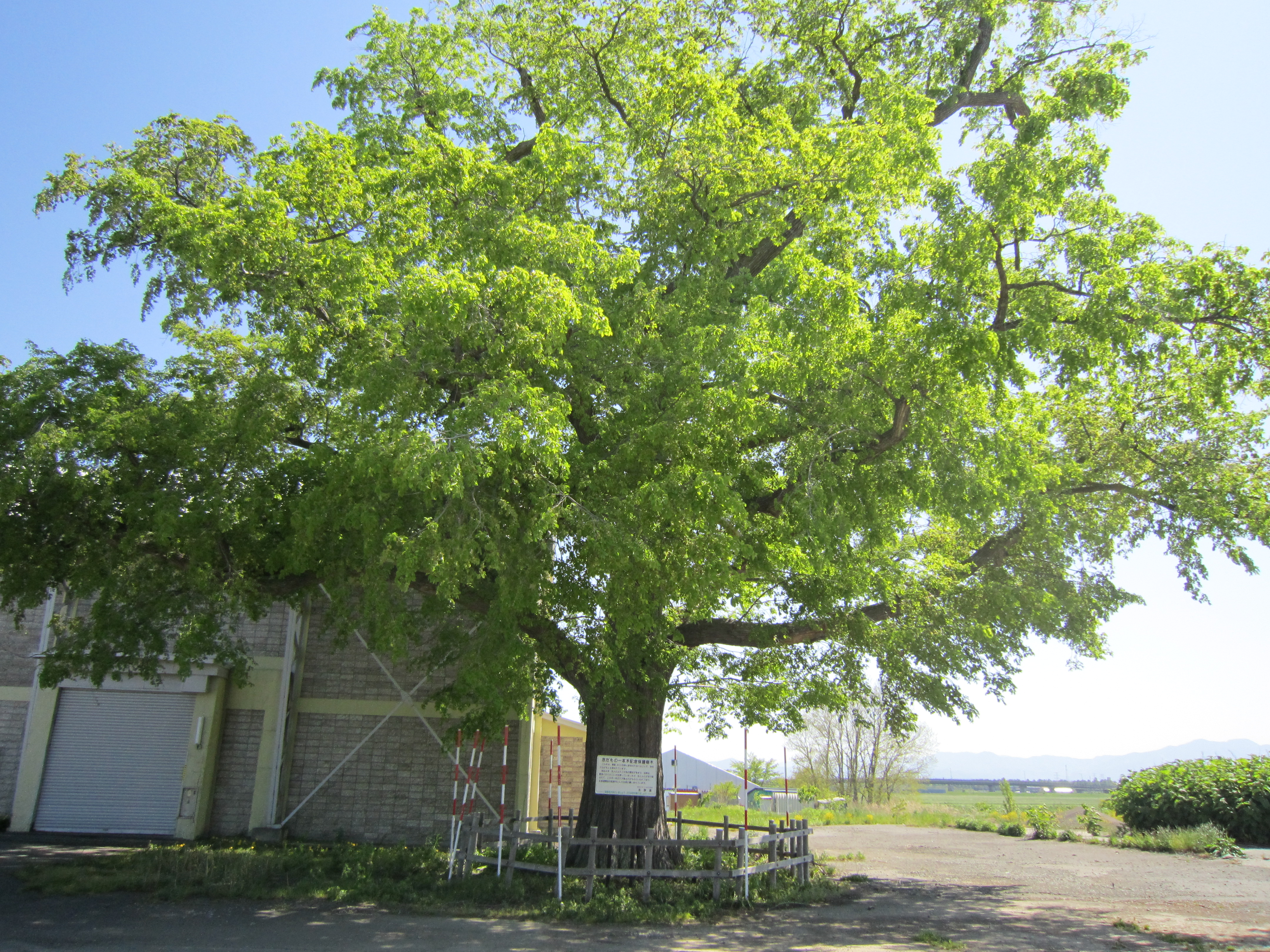
Japanese Elm at Oyafuru, Ishikari, Hokkaido (2020)

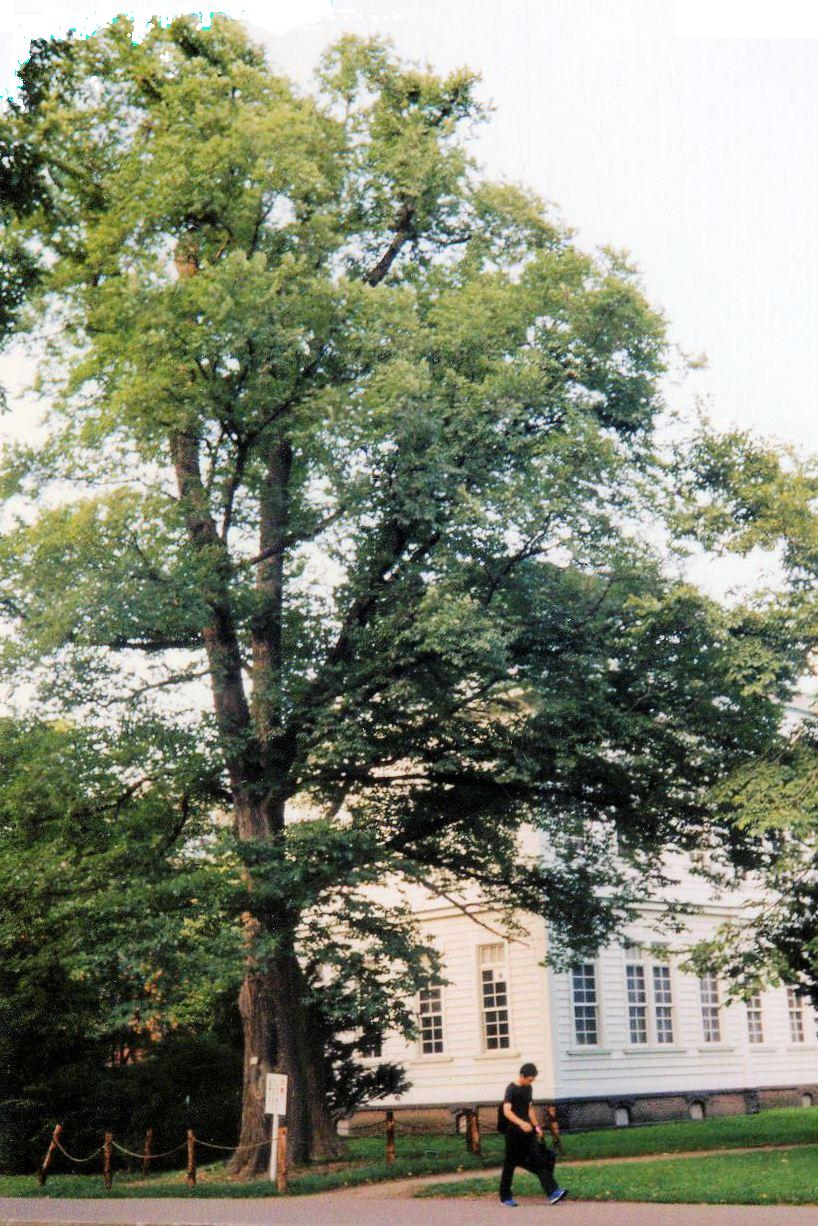
Japanese elm, Sapporo (2010)

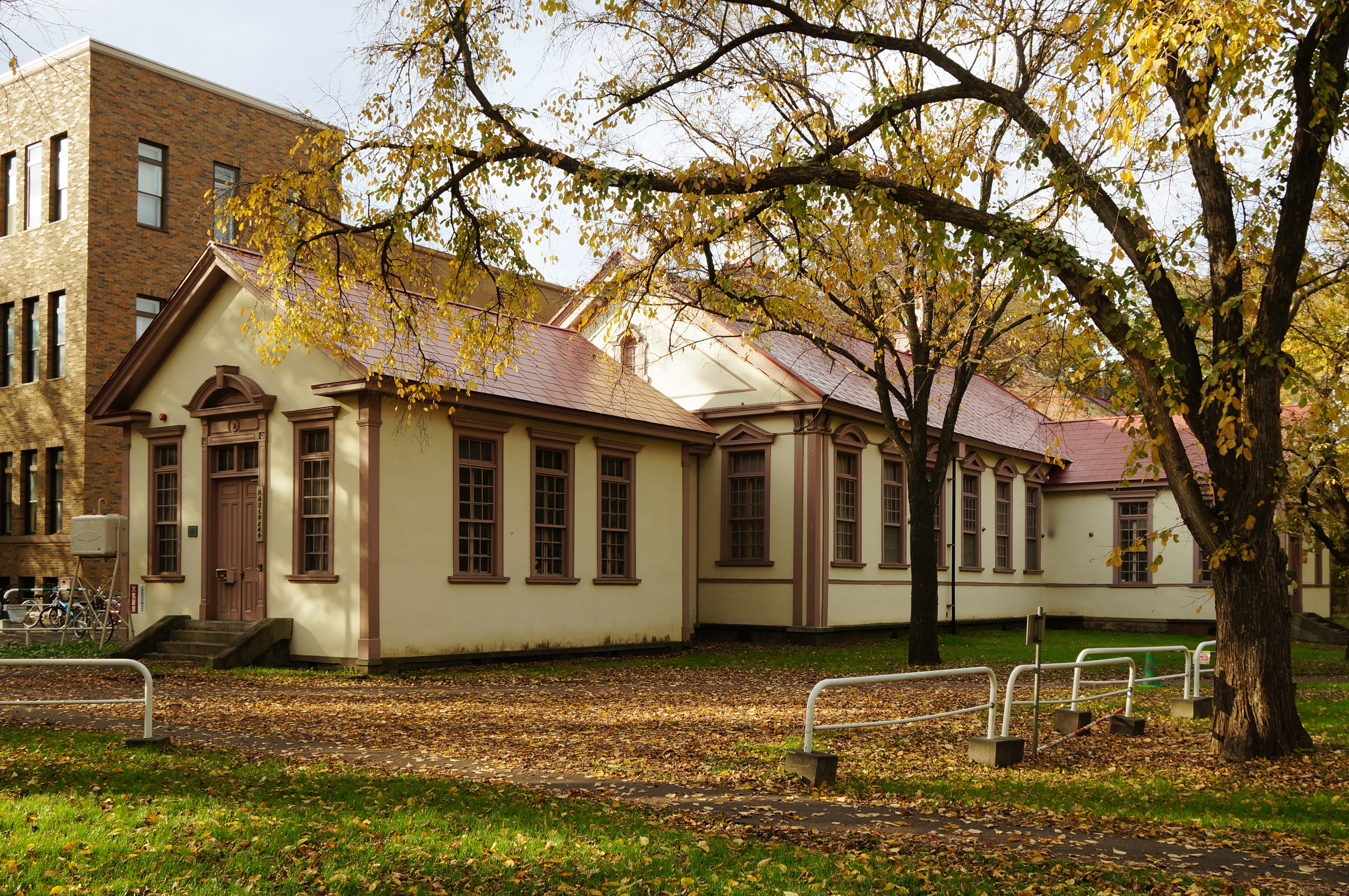
Autumn colouring Hokkaido University Botanical Gardens, Sapporo

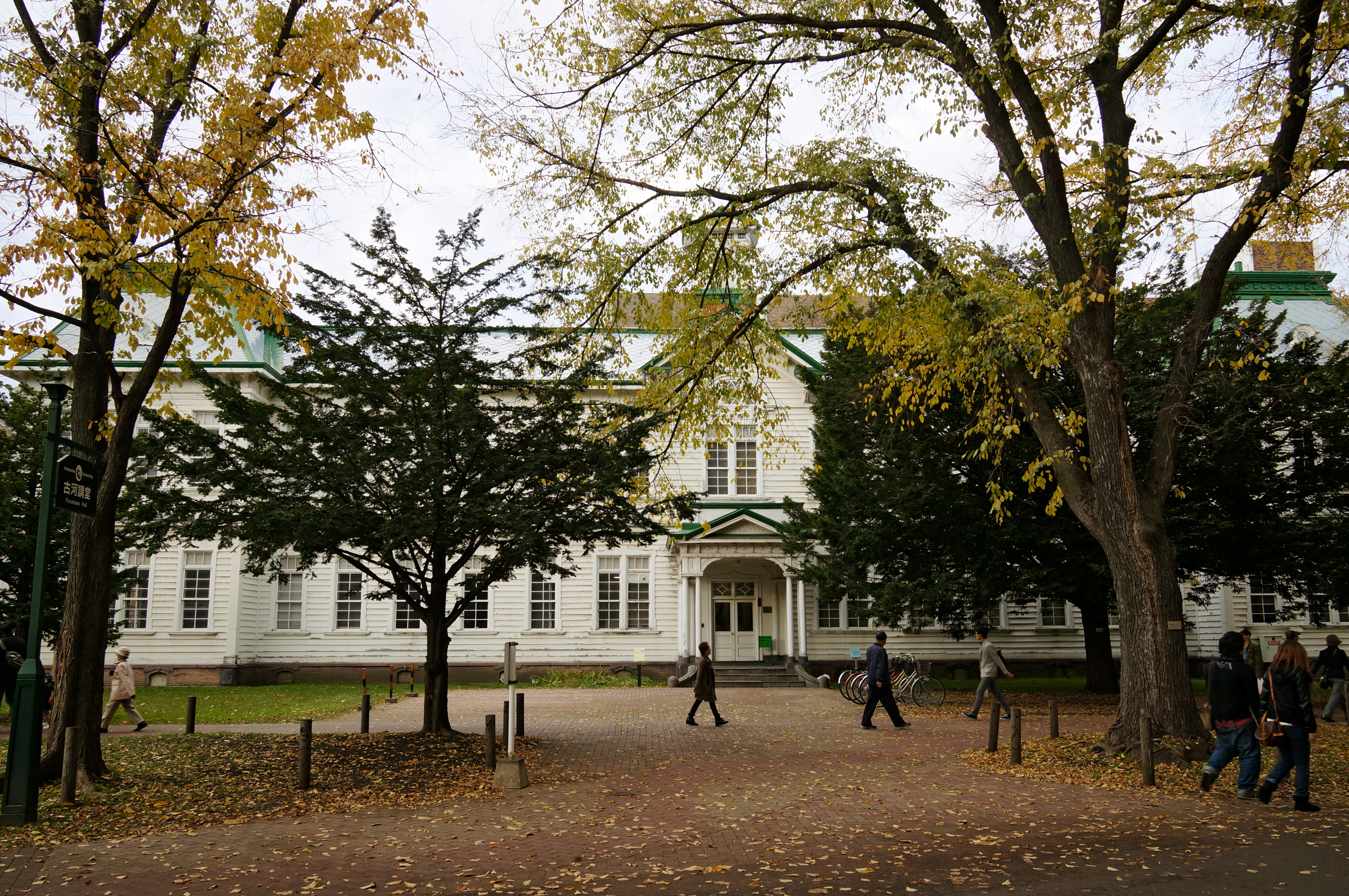
Japanese elms, Hokkaido University Botanical Gardens

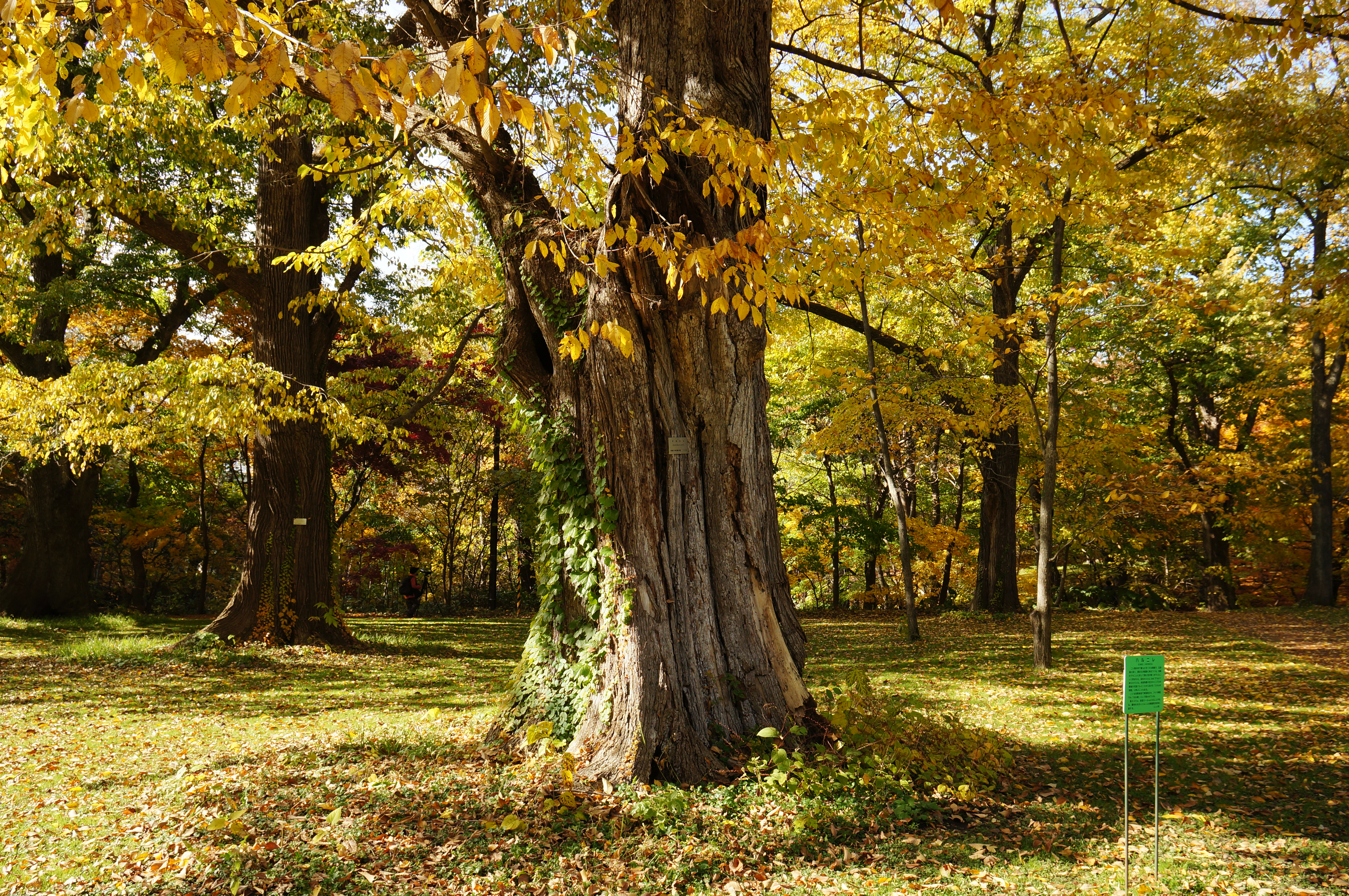
Old tree in Hokkaido University Botanical Gardens, Sapporo

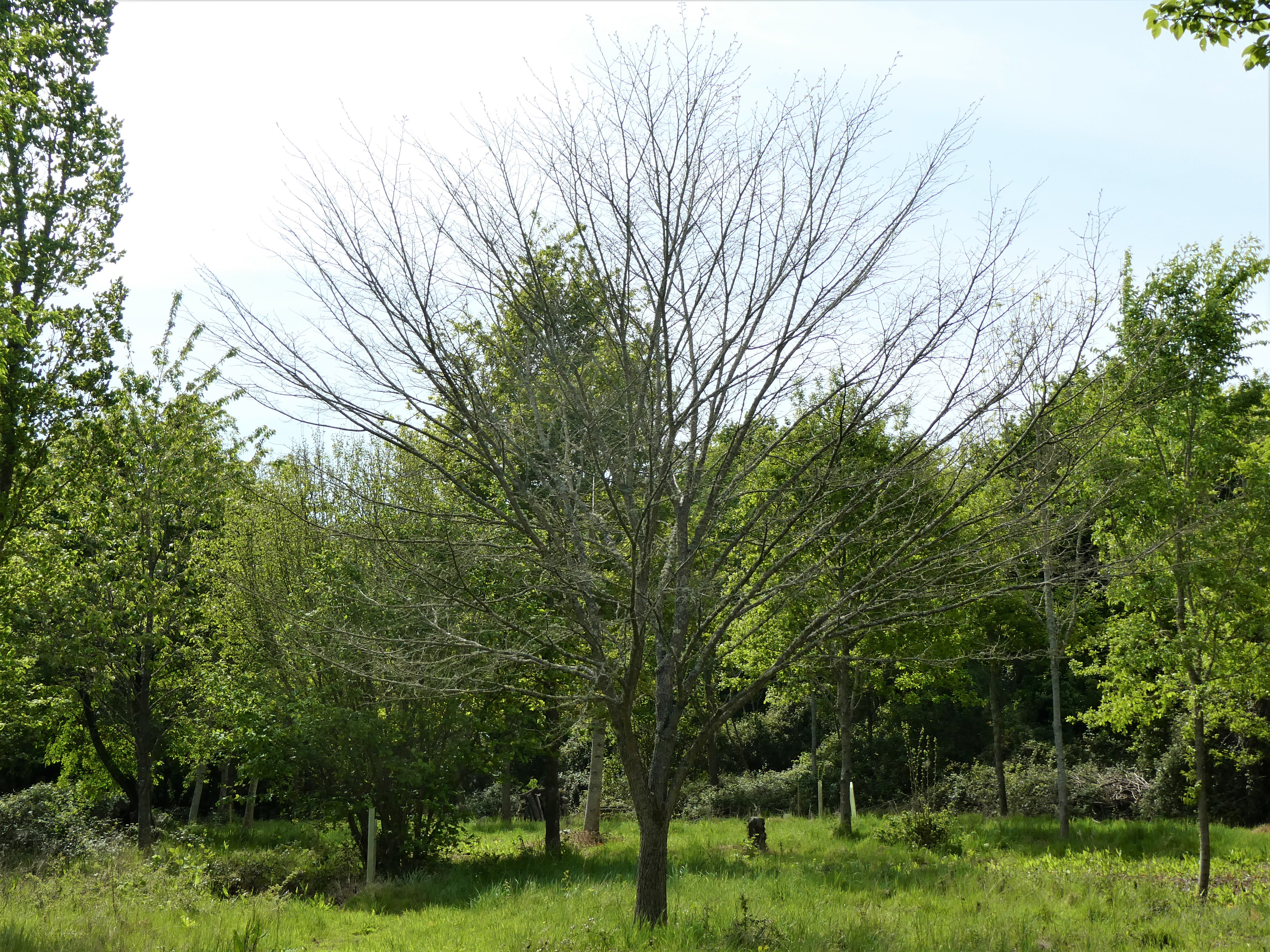
Japanese elm in early May before leaf flushing, Great Fontley, UK

== Notable trees ==
In the UK, the TROBI Champion grows at the Royal Horticultural Society's Rosemoor garden in Devon, measuring 16 m tall in 2017. Another large tree grows at the Sir Harold Hillier Gardens, Romsey, measuring 13 m tall by 42 cm d.b.h. in 2003. A large specimen grows at Sussex University, Falmer, Brighton, but may be the cultivar 'Jacan'. The oldest putative specimen in Edinburgh, possibly one of those supplied as U. campestris japonica by Späth in 1903, had a bole-girth of about 3.5 m (felled 2018).

== Cultivars ==
Japanese elm was assessed in Canada as a substitute for native elms which had succumbed to Dutch elm disease. Six particularly hardy cultivars were released there in the 1980s; five were also raised in the United States .

- Burgundy Glow = Northern Empress
- Discovery
- JFS-Bieberich = Emerald Sunshine (formerly treated under U. propinqua Koidz.)
- JFS-KW2UD = Greenstone
- Jacan
- Jeffree = Freedom
- Mitsui Centennial
- Prospector (formerly treated under Wilson's elm U. wilsoniana C.K. Schneid.)
- Reseda
- Thomson
- Validation.

However, most of the Canadian clones have now been withdrawn from commerce owing to the Canadian government's restrictions on the movement of elm within the country, adopted to prevent the spread of Dutch elm disease. The London office of Mitsui & Co. imported and distributed a number of the Canadian cultivars ('Thomson', 'Jacan' and 'Mitsui Centennial'), to commemorate its centenary in 1980; the majority went to Brighton & Hove City Council, while several were obtained by the Sir Harold Hillier Gardens, whence one was removed and planted outside the Elm Tree Inn at Swanwick to commemorate the centenary of Hampshire County Council in 1989. The USDA cultivar 'Prospector' was imported into the UK in 2009 by the Hampshire & Isle of Wight Branch, Butterfly Conservation.

== Hybrids and hybrid cultivars ==
- Ulmus × mesocarpa, a natural hybrid of U. davidiana var. japonica and Ulmus macrocarpa was discovered in South Korea in the 1980s.
- The hybrid Ulmus davidiana var. japonica × U. minor was raised at the Arnold Arboretum before 1924.
- The Japanese elm was widely used in the US in hybridization experiments at the Morton Arboretum and University of Wisconsin, resulting in the release of the following cultivars:
  - Cathedral
  - Morton = Accolade
  - Morton Glossy = Triumph
  - Morton Plainsman = Vanguard
  - Morton Red Tip = Danada Charm
  - Morton Stalwart = Commendation
  - New Horizon
  - Patriot
  - Rebona
  - Repura
  - Revera
  - Sapporo Autumn Gold.
- In Canada Japanese elm was the male parent of the hybrid cultivar 'Night Rider' with 'Sapporo Autumn Gold', the female.
- The species has also been crossed with Dutch hybrids by the Istituto per la Protezione delle Piante (IPP) in Florence, Italy.
- Two clones, 'FL 610' and 'FL 626' were evaluated in England, by Butterfly Conservation.

== Accessions ==
North America

- Arnold Arboretum, US. Acc. nos. 4119 (from cult. material), 917-78, wild collected in Korea.
- Brenton Arboretum, US. Listed as U. wilsoniana; no details available.
- Brooklyn Botanic Garden, New York, US. Acc. no. 780251 (listed as U. japonica).
- Chicago Botanic Garden, US. 1 tree in the West Collections Area, listed as U. propinqua var. suberosa.
- Dawes Arboretum , US. 1 tree, no acc. details available.
- Holden Arboretum, US. Acc. nos. 80-664 (unrecorded provenance), 97-126, wild collected in Korea.
- Morton Arboretum, US. Acc. nos. 514-39, 679-62, 680-62, 354-U, 23-2008, 73-2011, also two others under the synonyms of U. propinqua Koidz. or cork bark elm (acc. no. 53-96), and U. propinqua Koidz. var. suberosa, collected from the Nei Mongol Zizhiqu Autonomous Region, China, (acc. no. 52-95).
- U S National Arboretum, Washington, D.C., US. Acc. no. 68998. Also (listed under synonym U. japonica): 76253, 76254, 76227, and (listed under syn. U. propinqua): 76249, 68985, and (listed under U. propinqua var. suberosa): 76234, 76244, 76241.

Europe

- Batsford Arboretum, Moreton-in-Marsh, UK. Acc. no. 1997/139/G05 Japan, planted 1999; south of the Japanese Deer statues
- Brighton & Hove City Council, UK. NCCPG Elm Collection.
- Grange Farm Arboretum, Lincolnshire, UK. Listed as Ulmus japonica; acc. no. 514
- Great Fontley, Fareham, UK, Butterfly Conservation Elm Trials plantation, planted 2002, grown from seed collected from the Great Elm, Hokkaido University, Sapporo, Japan.
- Hortus Botanicus Nationalis, Salaspils, Latvia. Acc. nos. 18128,29,30,31.
- Linnaean Gardens of Uppsala, Sweden, (as U. japonica). Acc. no. 1998-1284, obtained from the Russian Federation, and 2001-1659, wild collected in South Korea.
- Royal Botanic Garden Benmore, UK. Listed as U. davidiana var. japonica, acc. no. 19031053.
- Royal Botanic Gardens, Kew, UK. Acc. nos. 1995-581, 1995-1305
- Royal Horticultural Society Garden Rosemoor, Great Torrington, Devon; planted 1988
- Royal Horticultural Society Gardens, Wisley, UK. Listed as U. japonica, no details available.
- Sir Harold Hillier Gardens, UK. Listed as U. japonica, acc. nos. 1977.5234, 1977.5972, 1977.6373, 1982.4019.
- Tallinn Botanic Garden, Estonia. . Listed as U. japonica, no accession details available.
- Thenford House arboretum, Oxfordshire, UK, no details available.
- Wijdemeren City Council, Netherlands. Elm Arboretum, Brilhoek, Nederhorst den Berg, 2 planted in 2019 as U. propinqua.

== Nurseries ==
North America

- Patmore Nursery, Brandon, Manitoba, Canada
- Sun Valley Garden Centre, Eden Prairie, Minnesota, US

Europe

- Arboretum Waasland , Nieuwkerken-Waas, Belgium
