= Ulmus davidiana var. japonica 'Validation' =

Elm cultivar

- Variety: Ulmus davidiana var. japonica
- Cultivar: 'Validation'
- Origin: Morton Arboretum, Illinois, US

The Japanese Elm cultivar Ulmus davidiana var. japonica 'Validation' is a selection made by Kunso Kim and Bethany Brown of the Morton Arboretum released in 2011; propagation is by grafting onto Siberian Elm Ulmus pumila rootstocks.

== Description ==
'Validation' is a vase-shaped tree, the trunk bark smooth and gray. The current year's twigs are light green, contrasting with the previous year's, which are greenish brown.

== Pests and diseases ==
Not known.

== Cultivation ==
The tree is very rare in cultivation beyond the Morton Arboretum.

== Accessions ==
North America

- Morton Arboretum, Illinois, US. Acc. No. 22-2008, one plant.

Europe

- Grange Farm Arboretum, Lincolnshire, UK. Acc. no. 1126.
