= Ulmus 'Cathedral' =

Elm cultivar

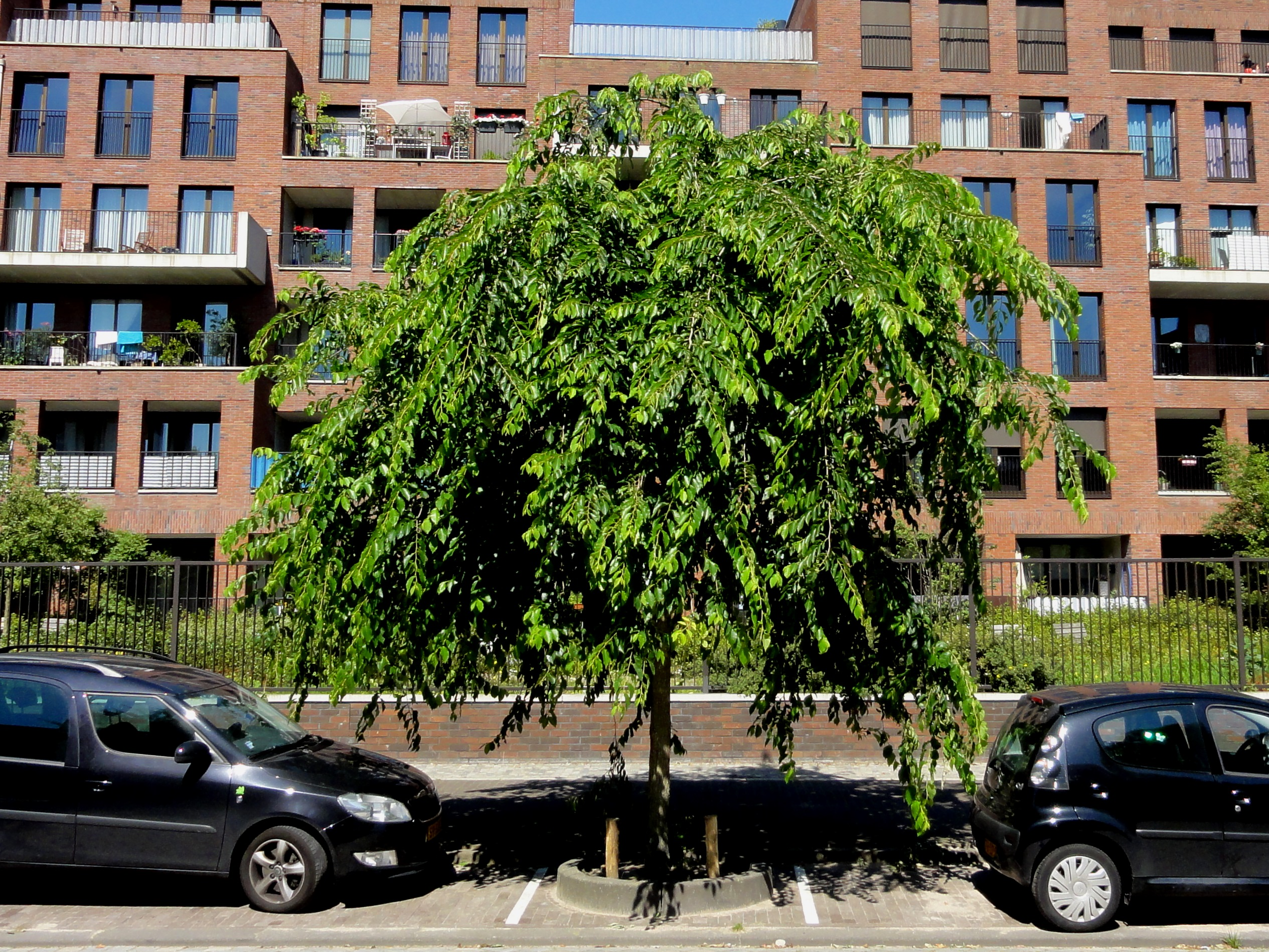
- 'Cathedral' in Jean Desmetstraat, Amsterdam
- Genus: Ulmus
- Hybrid parentage: U. davidiana var. japonica × U. pumila
- Cultivar: 'Cathedral'
- Origin: WARF, Wisconsin, US

Ulmus 'Cathedral' is a hybrid cultivar raised at University of Wisconsin–Madison (no. W44-25) patented in 1994. Arising from a chance crossing of the Japanese elm (female parent) and Siberian elm, seed was sent in 1958 by Prof. Nobuku Takahashi and his colleagues at the Sapporo Botanical Garden of Hokkaido University, Sapporo, to Eugene Smalley at Wisconsin–Madison; 'Cathedral' is thus a sibling of 'Sapporo Autumn Gold'.

== Description ==
The tree is distinguished by its weeping form and large elliptic leaves, < 14 cm long by < 8 cm broad, almost the same size and shape of those of its female parent, the Japanese Elm, spinach green when mature, turning yellow and orange in autumn.

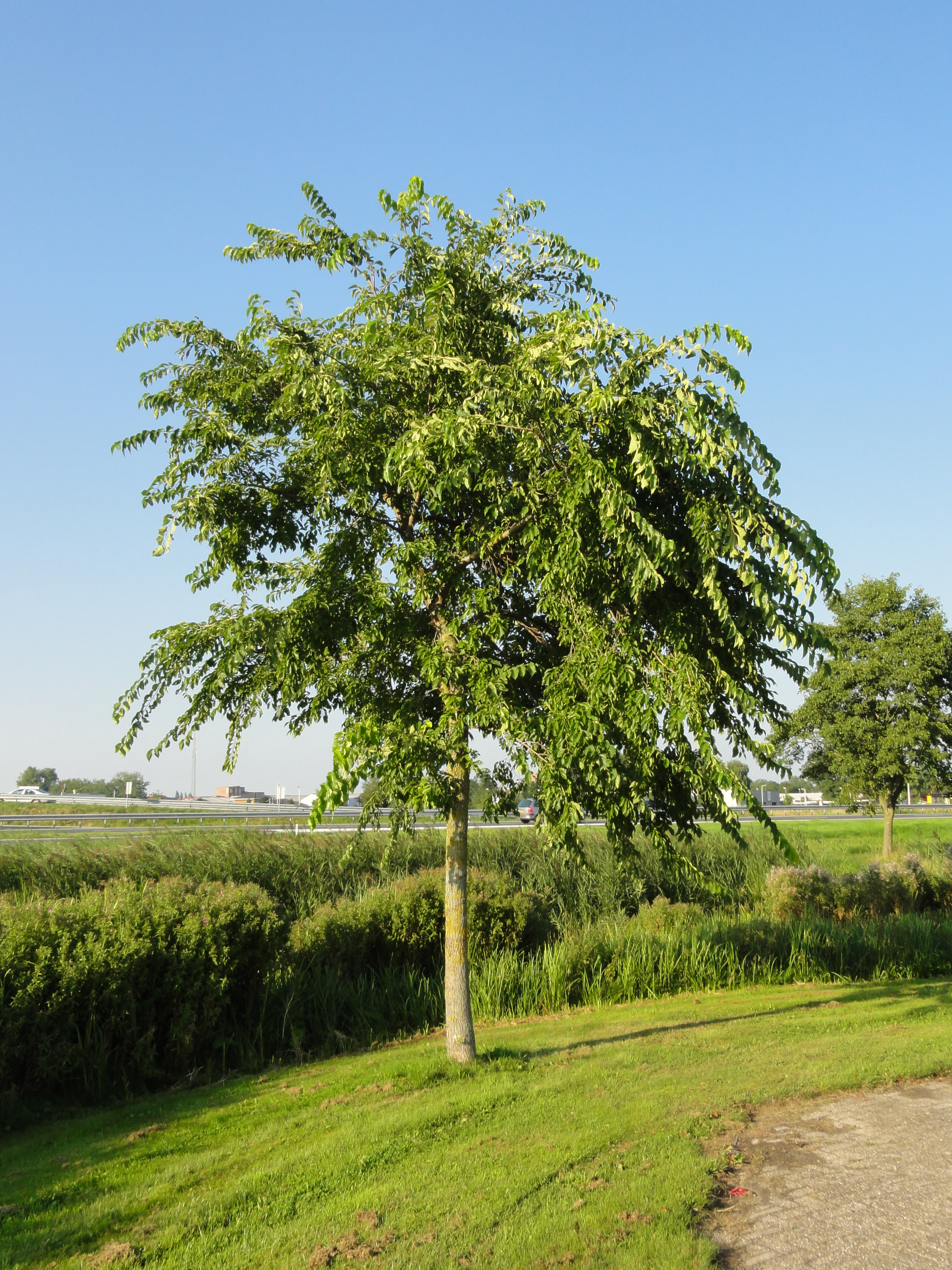
'Cathedral', Akkerwinde, Sneek , the Netherlands

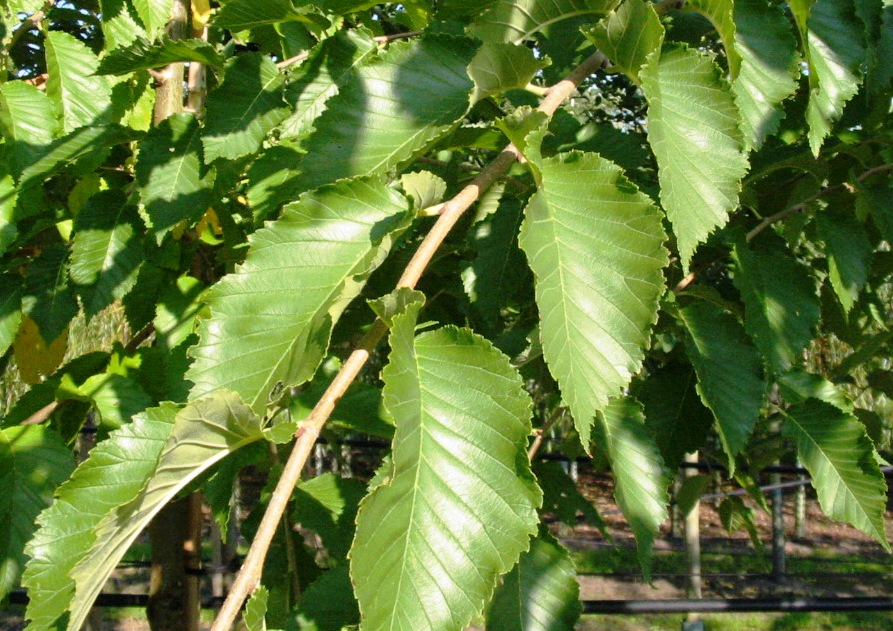
Foliage

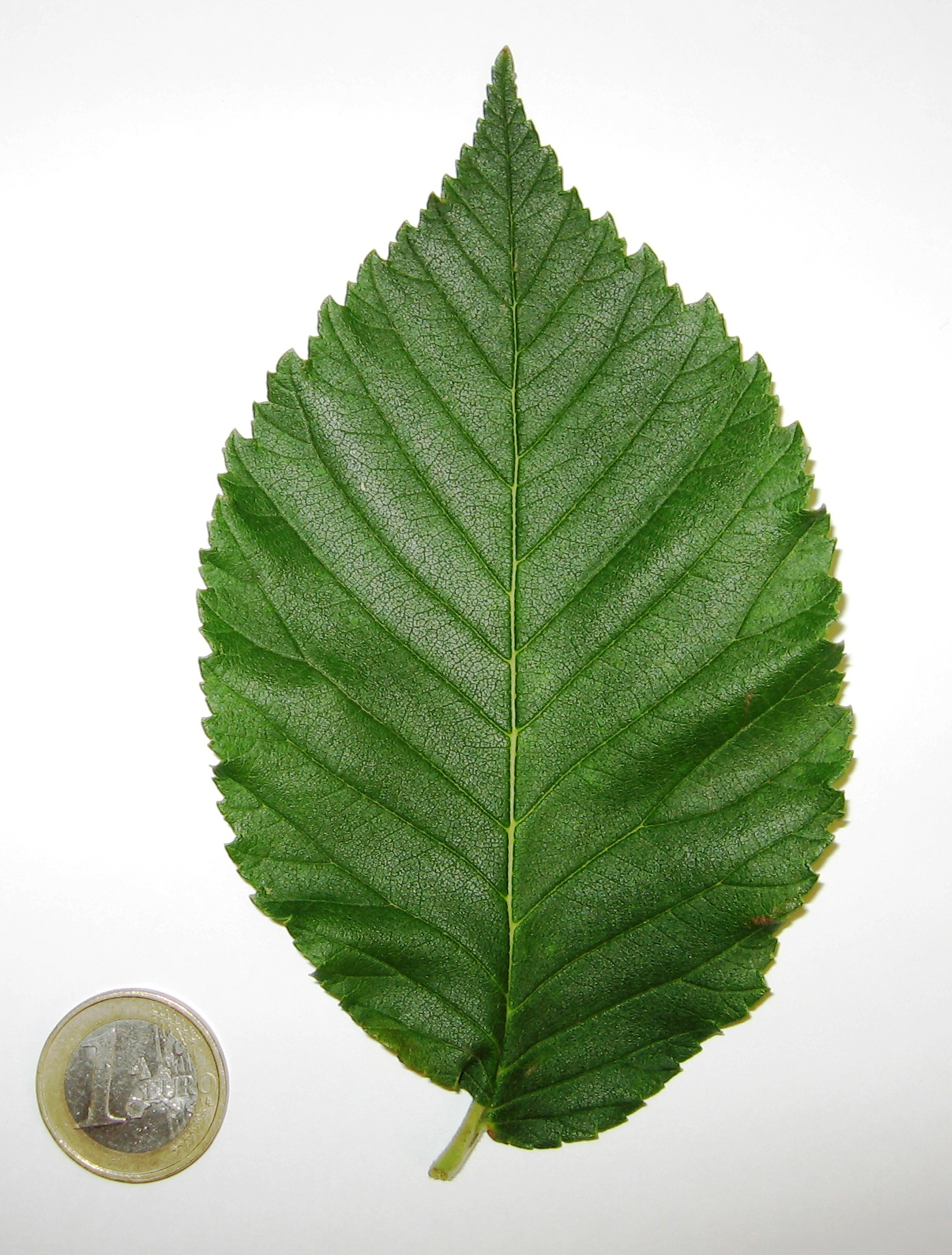
Leaf and 1 Euro coin

== Pests and diseases ==
Tests in the United States have found 'Cathedral' to be less resistant to Dutch elm disease than its WARF stablemates such as 'New Horizon', although damage is usually confined to the branch tips. Studies in France by the Institut National de la Recherche Agronomique (INRA) confirmed the tree as only 'moderately resistant'. The leaves are also favoured by leaf hoppers and other insects that feed by piercing and sucking.

== Cultivation ==
The tree requires relatively high levels of maintenance owing to its predilection for breaks occasioned by branch inclusions. 'Cathedral' is widely available across the United States, and has also been commercially released in Europe.

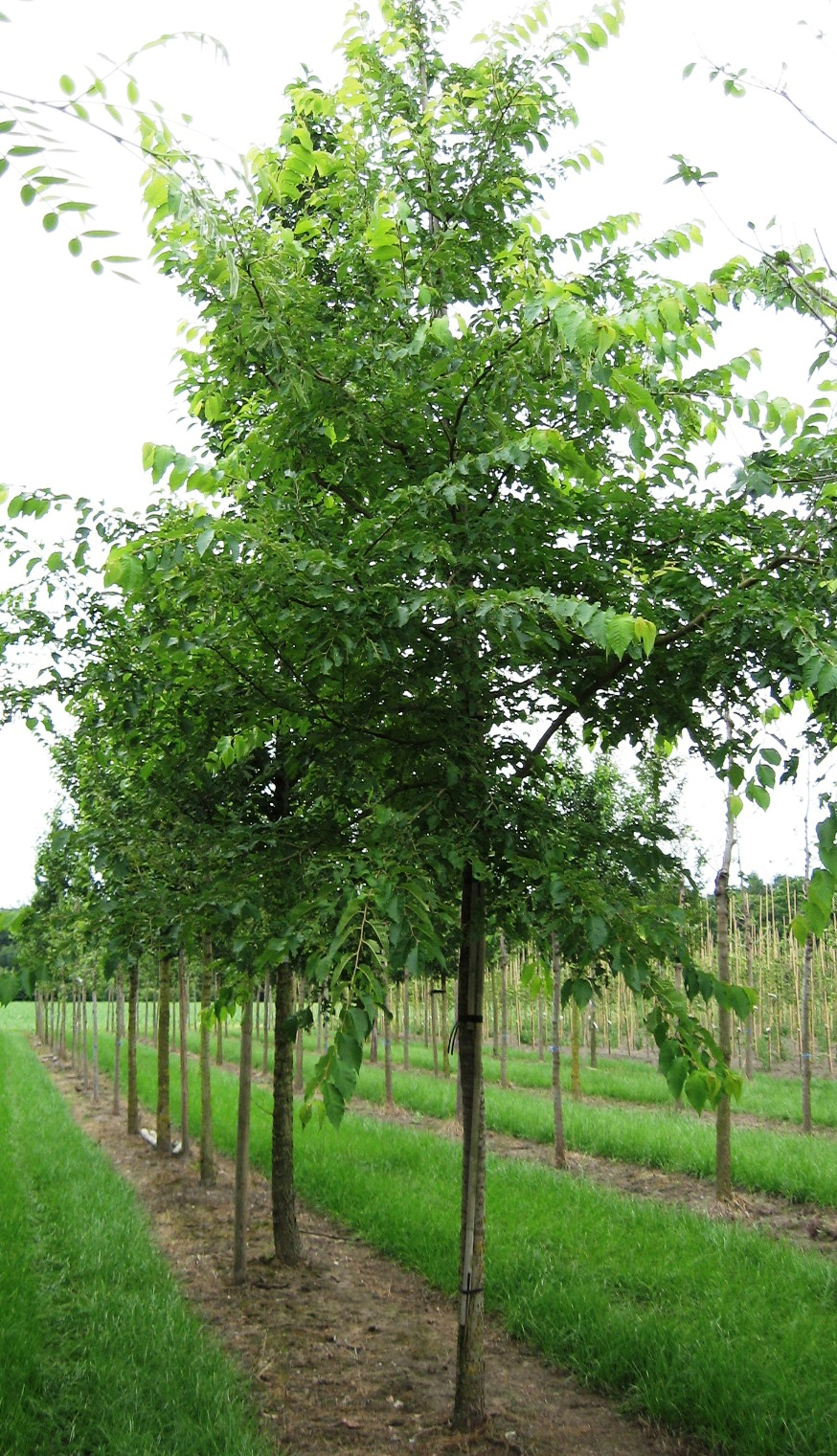
Young 'Cathedral', Glimmen, the Netherlands

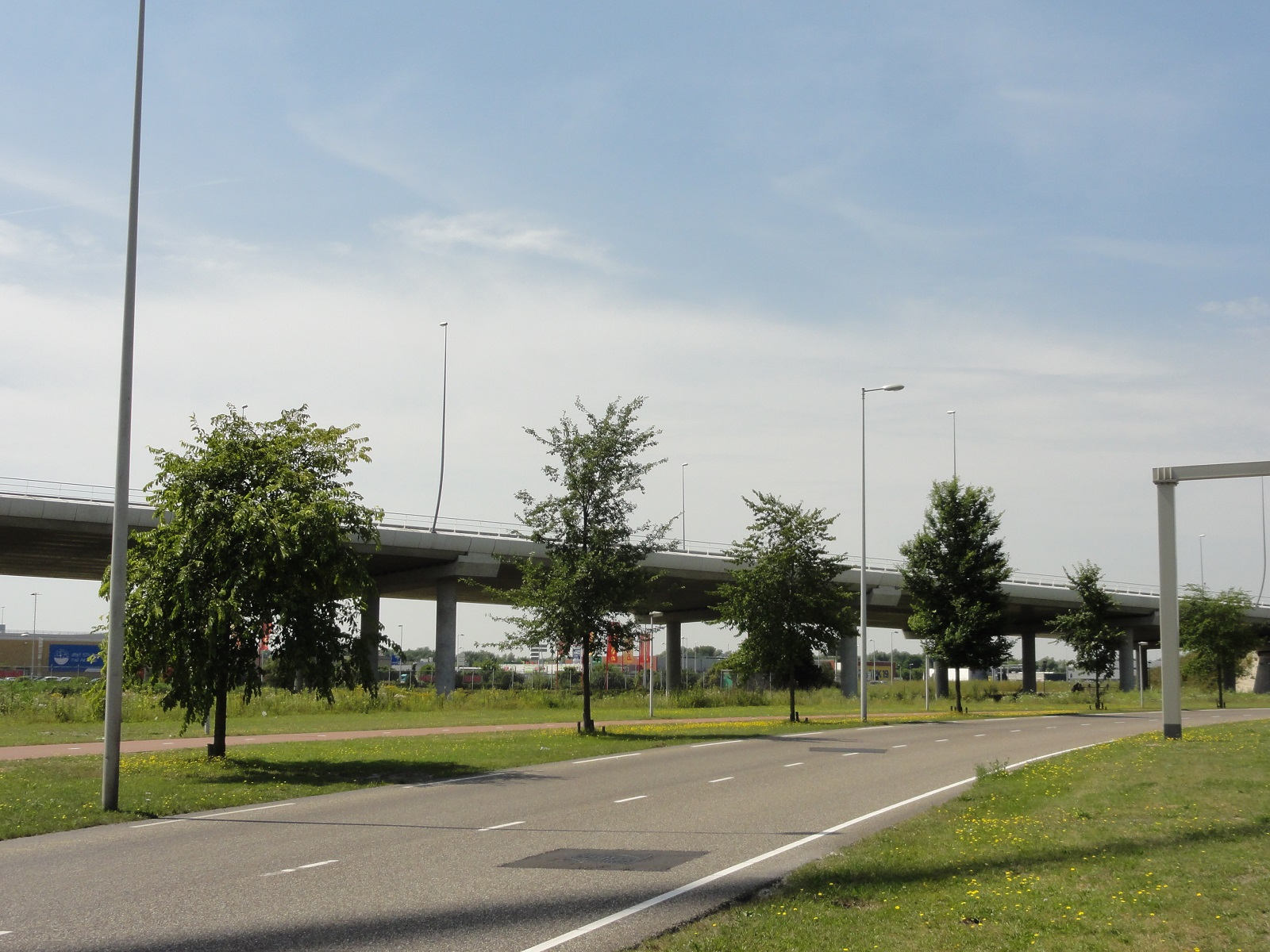
Elm cultivars in the Netherlands; 'Cathedral' at far left

== Etymology ==
The tree was named by Mr Donald Willeke of Minneapolis, who observed that where planted in tight rows, a series of gothic cathedral-like arches was ultimately created between the trees.

== Accessions ==
=== North America ===
- Brenton Arboretum, US. 5 trees, acquired 2009. Acc. no. not known.
- Holden Arboretum, US. Acc. no. 91–202
- Morton Arboretum, US. Acc. no. 205–2008, 30–2009

=== Europe ===
- Grange Farm Arboretum , Sutton St James, Spalding, Lincs., UK. Acc. no. 1058.

== Nurseries ==
=== North America ===
- Bailey Nurseries , St Paul, Minnesota, US.
- Johnson's Nursery , Menomonee Falls, Wisconsin, US.
- Lee Nursery Inc. , Fertile, Minnesota, US.
- Linder's Garden Center, St. Paul, Minnesota, US.
- Sherman Nurseries, Charles City, Iowa, US.
- Sun Valley Garden Centre, Eden Prairie, Minnesota, US.

=== Europe ===
- Future Forests , Kealkill, Bantry, County Cork, Ireland.
- Noordplant kwekerijen , Glimmen, Netherlands.
