= Ulmus davidiana var. japonica 'Discovery' =

Elm cultivar

- Variety: Ulmus davidiana var. japonica
- Cultivar: 'Discovery'
- Origin: Canada

The Japanese Elm cultivar Ulmus davidiana var. japonica 'Discovery' is a cold-resistant selection from Canada, raised along with 'Freedom' in the 1980s by Dr Wilbert Ronald, of Jeffries Nurseries Ltd. and Rick Durand of Shade Consulting Services, Portage la Prairie, Manitoba.

== Description ==
Unlike other Japanese Elms, the growth habit of 'Discovery' is symmetrical, upright, and vase-shaped. The leaves are obovate to oval, and slightly smaller than is typical of the species, their colour dark green turning yellow in autumn. The tree grows to over 15 m (50ft) in height, with a spread of much the same dimension.

== Pests and diseases ==
The tree is resistant to Dutch elm disease and elm leaf beetle Xanthogaleruca luteola.

== Cultivation ==
'Discovery' performed very poorly in government trials in Alberta, Canada, failing completely at five out of six sites. Moreover, the survivors developed a very poor branching pattern requiring pruning to strengthen crotches. 'Discovery' fared better in trials conducted by the University of Minnesota, which considered it "quite hardy", but the tree was criticized for its comparatively slow growth and need for continued crown thinning when young, the latter factor largely disqualifying it as a street tree. Nonetheless, a number of trees have been established in the Minneapolis Parks system. The species does not sucker from roots.

'Discovery' is not known to have been introduced to Europe or Australasia.

== Accessions ==
=== North America ===
- Brenton Arboretum, Dallas Center, Iowa, US. No details available.
- Smith College, US. Acc. no. 4703.

== Nurseries ==
=== North America ===
- Bailey Nurseries , St. Paul, Minnesota, US.
- Jeffries Nurseries, Portage la Prairie, Manitoba, Canada.
- Johnson's Nursery , Menomonee Falls, Wisconsin, US.
- Lee Nursery Inc. , Fertile, Minnesota, US.
- Linder's Garden Center, St. Paul, Minnesota|St. Paul, Minnesota, US.
- Minnesota Valley Nurseries, Shakopee, Minnesota, US.
- Patmore Nursery, Brandon, Manitoba, US.
- Robinson Nursery Amity, Oregon, US.
- Sun Valley Garden Centre, Eden Prairie, Minnesota, US.
