= Ulmus × mesocarpa =

Scientific classification
- Kingdom: Plantae
- Clade: Tracheophytes
- Clade: Angiosperms
- Clade: Eudicots
- Clade: Rosids
- Order: Rosales
- Family: Ulmaceae
- Genus: Ulmus
- Species: U. × mesocarpa

Binomial name
- Ulmus × mesocarpa M.Kim & S.Lee

Hybrid plant

Ulmus × mesocarpa is a natural hybrid elm which is a cross of Ulmus macrocarpa with Japanese elm Ulmus davidiana var. japonica discovered on Seoraksan (Mount Sorak) near the city of Sokcho on the eastern coast of South Korea. The tree is endemic to the provinces of Gangwon-do, Injegun, Bukmyeon, Yongdaeri, and Baekdamsa.

== Description ==
A small tree < 5 m high, typically intermediate between its parents, the generally obovate leaves 7–8 cm long, asymmetric at the base, with apices acuminate to caudate and an average of 31 teeth. The petioles are 6–8 mm long. The obovate samarae are < 20 mm long by 16 mm wide.

== Pests and diseases ==
Not known.

== Cultivation ==
Now in cultivation in the US and UK.

== Synonymy ==
- Ulmus davidiana var. japonica f. suberosa Nakai

== Accessions ==
North America

- Morton Arboretum, Lisle, Illinois, US. Acc. details not known.

Europe

- Grange Farm Arboretum, Sutton St James, Lincolnshire, UK. Juvenile trees (2015) from cuttings ex. Morton Arboretum on U. glabra rootstocks. Acc. no. 1101.

== Nurseries ==
Europe

- Pan-global Plants , Frampton on Severn, Gloucestershire, UK.
