= Ulmus macrocarpa var. glabra =

Scientific classification
- Kingdom: Plantae
- Clade: Tracheophytes
- Clade: Angiosperms
- Clade: Eudicots
- Clade: Rosids
- Order: Rosales
- Family: Ulmaceae
- Genus: Ulmus
- Species: U. macrocarpa
- Variety: U. m. var. glabra

Trinomial name
- Ulmus macrocarpa var. glabra Nie & Huang

Variety of tree

Ulmus macrocarpa var. glabra Nie & Huang is restricted to mixed forests in the Chinese province of Heilongjiang.

== Description ==
The tree is distinguished by a "leaf blade subelliptic, smooth, with tufted hairs in vein axil, base oblique, apex acuminate to narrowly acuminate. Samara smooth, glabrous, wings thin. Fl. Apr.–May, fr. May.–Jun".

== Pests and diseases ==
No information available.

== Cultivation ==
The tree is not known to be in cultivation beyond China.
