= Ulmus davidiana var. japonica 'Jacan' =

Elm cultivar

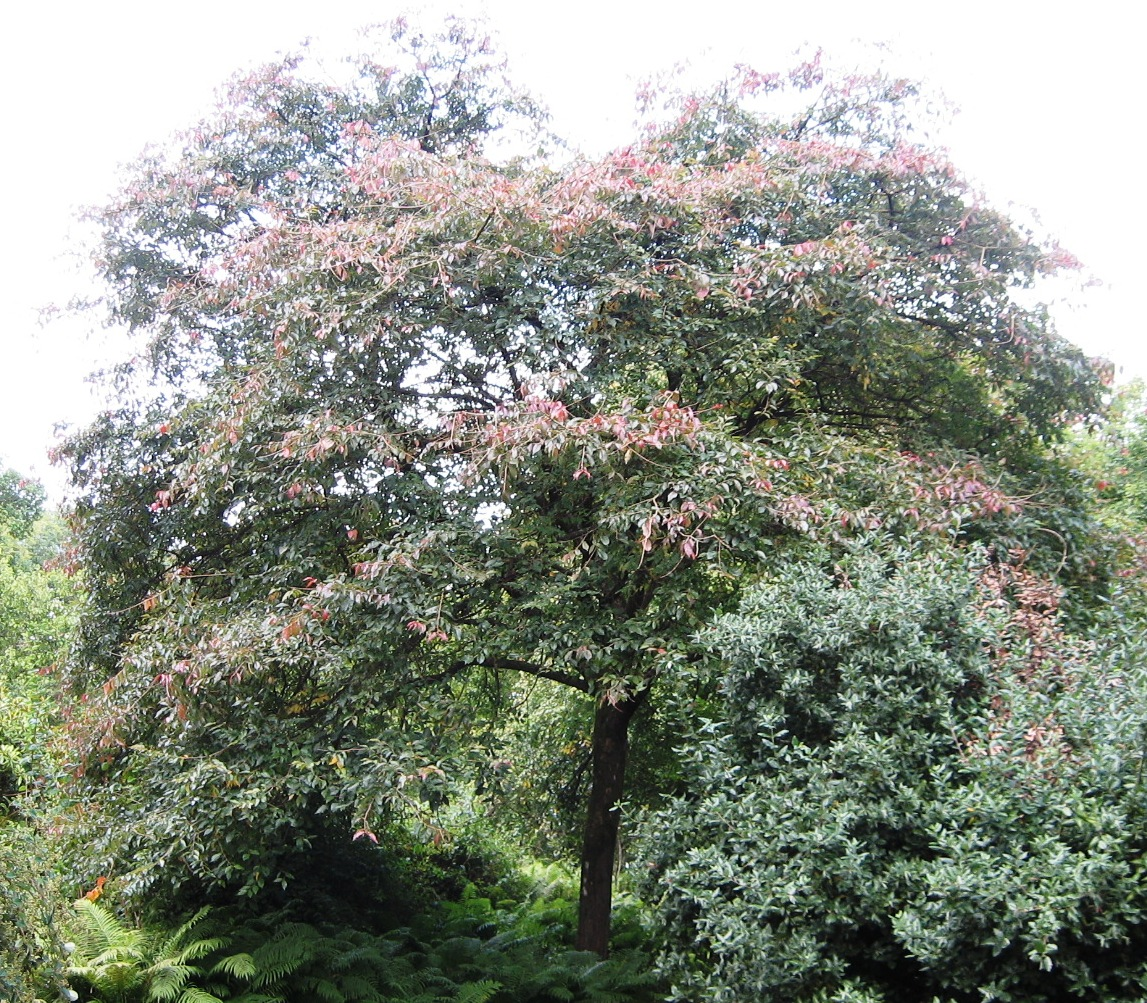
- 'Jacan', Sir Harold Hillier Gardens, UK
- Variety: Ulmus davidiana var. japonica
- Cultivar: 'Jacan'
- Origin: Canada

The Japanese Elm cultivar Ulmus davidiana var. japonica 'Jacan' is a cold-resistant selection from Canada. The tree was one of a group of second-generation japonica seedlings raised in the 1970s, originally for use in the prairie regions, by the Morden Research Station, Morden, Manitoba. It was first distributed in 1977, and was later among the four Asiatic elm cultivars, three sourced in Canada, donated to the UK in 1980 by the London branch of Mitsui & Co. to commemorate the company's centenary.

== Description ==
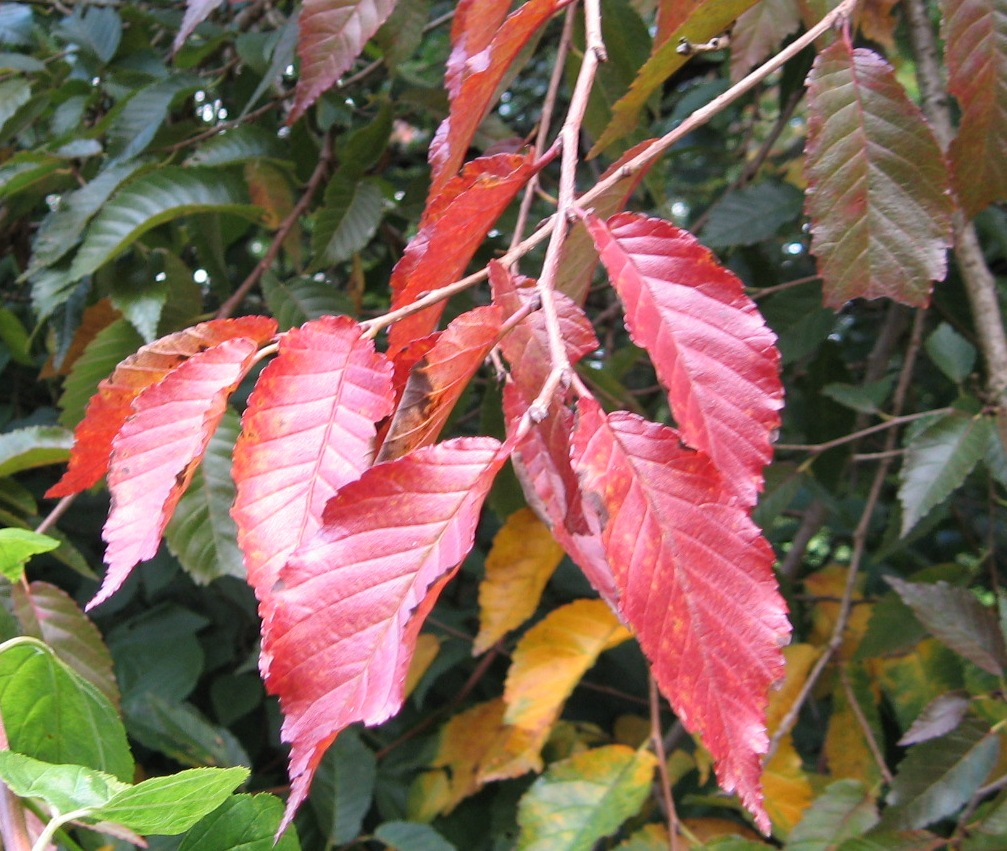
Autumn colour

'Jacan' develops a rounded crown form typical of the species; the foliage turns a deep red in autumn. The species does not sucker from roots.

== Pests and diseases ==
The tree is moderately resistant to Dutch elm disease, and elm leaf beetle Xanthogaleruca luteola . The tree's foliage was adjudged "resistant" to black spot by the Plant Diagnostic Clinic of the University of Missouri.

== Cultivation ==
'Jacan' has not been widely planted in Canada owing to restrictions imposed by the Canadian government on the movement of elms across the country, which severely limited its potential market. The tree was introduced to the UK (see Accessions) and Italy from Canada in the early 1980s, but was never in commerce in either and thus remains very rare. It is not known to have been introduced to Australasia. It was originally propagated by base-grafting on Siberian elm stock.

== Hybrids ==
'Jacan' was crossed with 'Sapporo Autumn Gold' by the Istituto per la Protezione delle Piante, Florence; the selection was identified as 'FL441'. Although it performed well in trials, being noted for its abundant foliage, 'FL441' was never patented or released to commerce.

== Accessions ==
North America

None known.

Europe

- Brighton & Hove City Council, UK, NCCPG National Elm Collection, UK champion: Sussex University campus, 15 m high, 31 cm d.b.h. in 2002, (listed as U. japonica 'Jacan').
- Grange Farm Arboretum, Sutton St James, Spalding, Lincolnshire, UK. Acc. no. not known.
- Sir Harold Hillier Gardens, UK. Acc. nos. 1981.0133, 1982.4002

== Nurseries ==
North America

- Patmore Nursery, Brandon, Manitoba, Canada.
- Sun Valley Garden Centre, Eden Prairie, Minnesota, US.

Europe

None known.
