= Sir Harold Hillier Gardens =

Arboretum in England

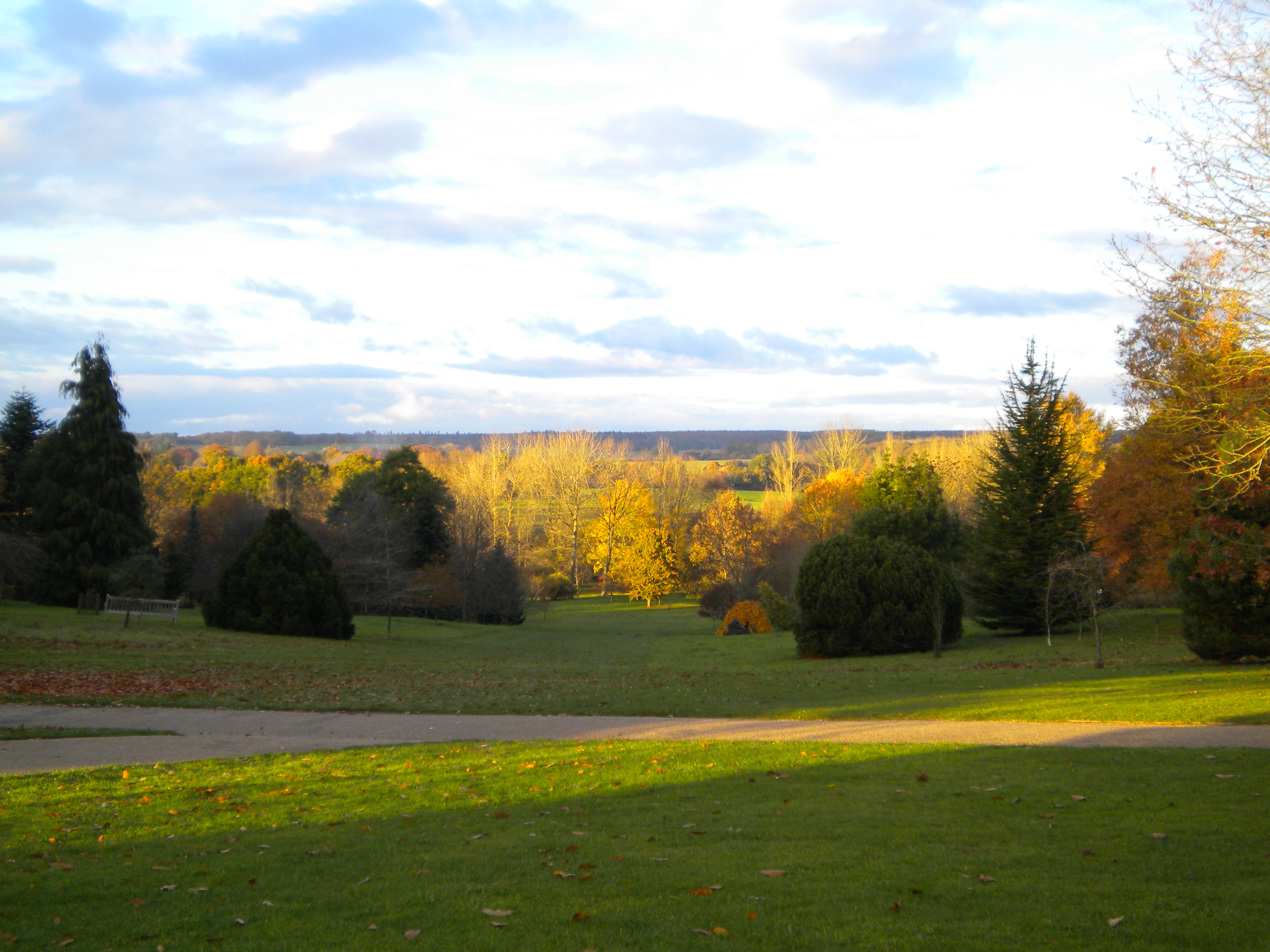
- An autumn view from the visitor centre

- Location within Hampshire
- Type: Arboretum
- Nearest city: Southampton
- Coordinates: 51°00′40″N 1°28′00″W
- Area: 180 acres (73 ha)
- Created: 1953
- Operator: Hampshire County Council
- Open: Yes
- Designation: Grade II

The Sir Harold Hillier Gardens is an arboretum comprising 72 hectares (180 acres) accommodating over 42,000 trees and shrubs in about 12,000 taxa, notably a collection of oaks, camellia, magnolia and rhododendron.

The Gardens are located 5 km (3 mi) northeast of the town of Romsey in Hampshire, England, and were formerly known simply as the Hillier Arboretum, founded by nurseryman Harold Hillier in June 1953 when he acquired Jermyn's House and its grounds.

The arboretum was given to Hampshire County Council in 1977 to be managed as a charitable trust. Sir Harold Hillier was knighted in 1983, just two years before his death at age 80 in 1985.

The Gardens were listed as Grade II on the National Register of Historic Parks and Gardens in 1997.

== Organisation ==
Run as a registered charity, the Gardens are continually developed to further Sir Harold’s philosophy of horticulture, conservation, education and recreation. The patron is Roy Lancaster, who was the first curator. A team of 18 experienced horticulturalists and arborists look after the collection alongside students and a team of 200 volunteers.

== Collections ==
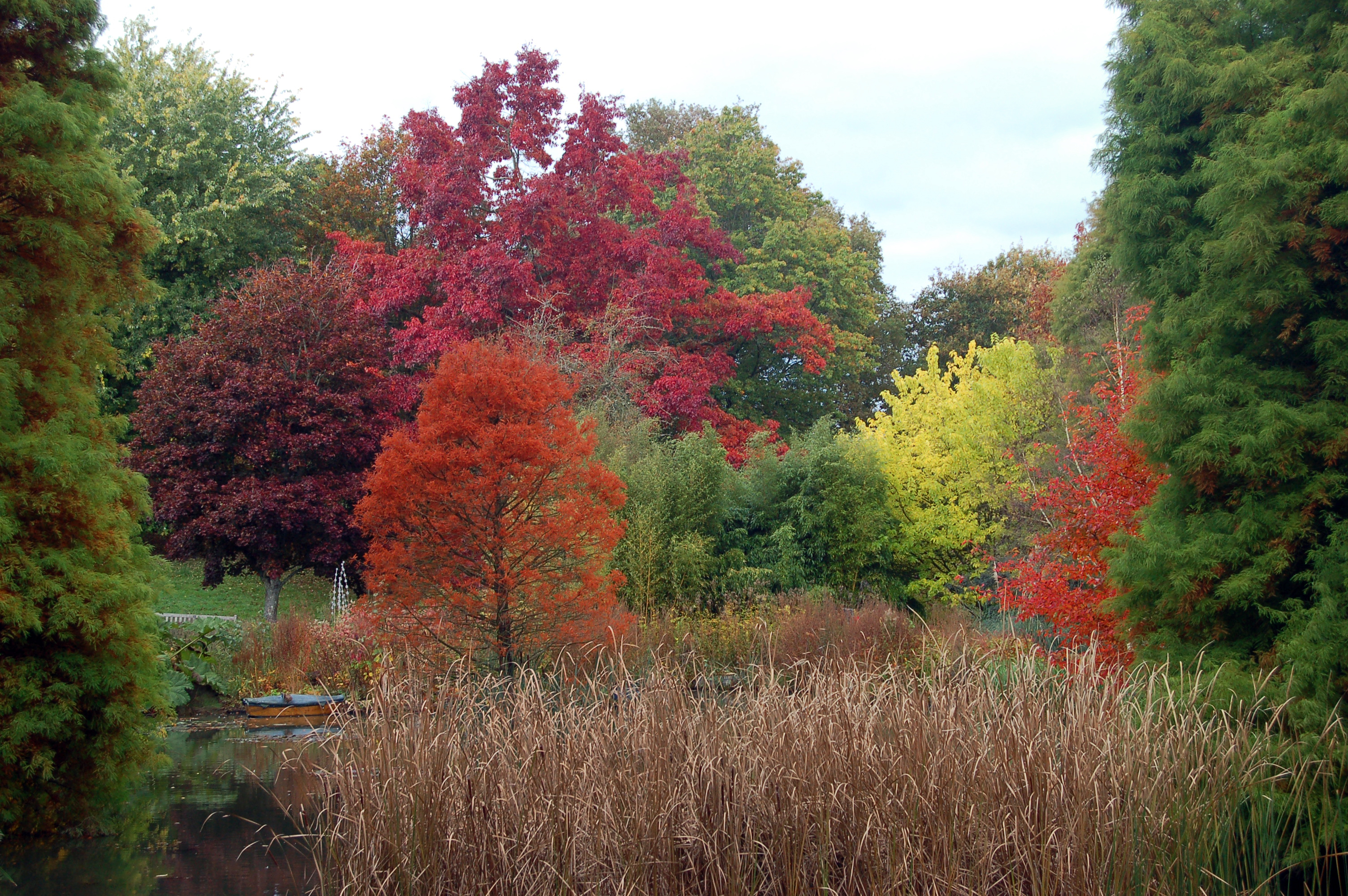
Autumn Colours

Sir Harold Hillier Gardens has one of the largest collections of hardy trees and shrubs in the world and is famous for its collection of rare plants.

=== National Plant Collection ===
It is home to 14 National Plant Collections including:

- Carpinus (hornbeam)
- Cercidiphyllum (katsura trees)
- Cornus (dogwoods)
- Corylus (hazels)
- Cotoneaster
- Hamamelis (witch hazels)
- Hillier Plants
- Hypericum
- Ligustrum (privets)
- Lithocarpus (stone/tanbark oak)
- Metasequoia (dawn redwoods)
- Photinia (christmas berry)
- Pinus (pines)
- Quercus (oaks)

=== Champion Trees ===
Sir Harold Hillier Gardens has the most comprehensive collection of Champion Trees in Britain and Ireland with 611 trees that are considered to be the largest, finest, or most rare of their species, as recorded by the Tree Register of the British Isles in 2020. The collection includes Metasequoia glyptostroboides, from the original batch of seed received by the Arnold Arboretum from China and distributed in 1948, its first introduction to the West. The young shoot is the emblem of the Gardens.

=== Rare plants ===
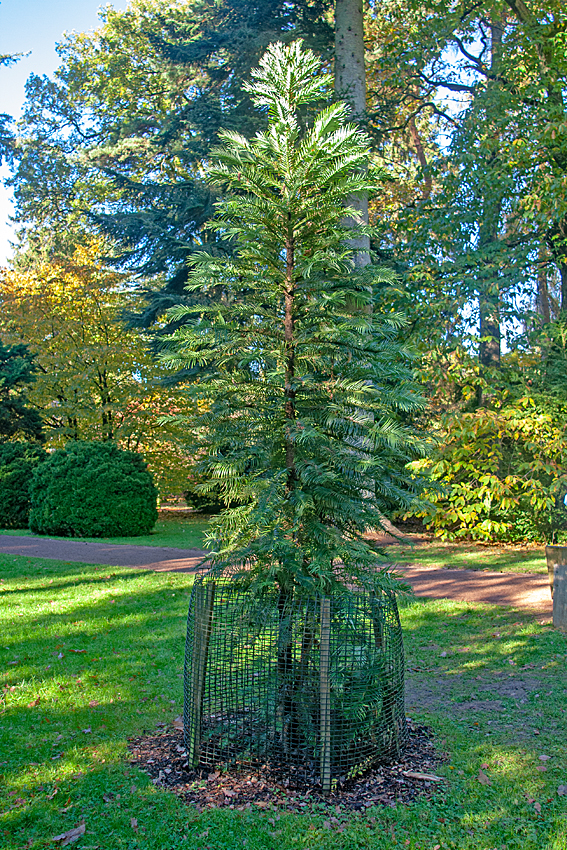
Wollemia nobilis

Sir Harold Hillier Gardens is renowned for its collections of rare plants, including:

- Magnolia macrophylla subsp. dealbata, with leaves up to 3 ft long and large, fragrant, white flowers.
- Calycanthus x raulstonii 'Hartlage Wine' is a magnolia relative, a spice bush hybrid with large red flowers
- Puya alpestris, flowering on the alpine screes
- Citrus ichangensis, a hardy species of lemon tree
- Illicium mexicanum, the large, red flowers of this Mexican native are a rare sight in the UK
- Paulownia kawakamii tree is known as the Sapphire dragon tree. The violet flowers open in May and are enormous. It is classified as critically endangered.
- Wollemia nobilis: three specimens of the fossil tree, one having flowered in 2010/11 for the first time.
- Quercus monimotricha, a dwarf oak from China

=== Plant trials ===
Sir Harold Hillier Gardens started a hypericum trial in 2014. This three year trial was in association with the Royal Horticultural Society and led by curator David Jewell. The aim of the trial was to establish garden worthiness, resolve any naming problems and assess their medicinal properties. The trial included approximately 65 different types of plants. The hypericum lancasteri, grown at the Gardens, is named in honour of patron Roy Lancaster. These trial grounds can be visited in the Gardens and are located behind Jermyn's House.

== Conservation ==
Besides growing many plants rare in cultivation, the Gardens grow over 200 threatened plant species and participates in a variety of conservation programmes, including collaboration on biodiversity projects on a local, national and international level.

At a press day in 1964, a journalist asked Sir Harold what he thought of the fledgling garden plant conservation movement. “I shall tell you what I think,” he replied. “Whilst other people are talking about it I am doing it, I am planting, planting, planting and I would urge others to do the same.”

== Gardens ==
Magnolia Avenue

A variety of landscapes have been designed for seasonal interest all year round.

- Acer Valley - A valley of Japanese and other maples and shaded by mature oaks.
- Bog Garden - Here bamboos are mixed with bold herbaceous perennials such as the enormous gunnera manicata
- Centenary Border - originally planted in 1964 by Sir Harold Hillier to celebrate the 100th anniversary of the founding of the Winchester nursery by his grandfather. It was planted with alternating 22 yard bays, to reflect Sir Harold's interest in cricket. It was decided in 2010 to develop a more suitable border and infrastructure to open up the border all year round. The Centenary Border is now the longest double mixed border in the country and was officially opened by the Duchess of Cornwall in 2013.
- Children's Education Garden - created for the education programmes provided by the Gardens it includes the Mediterranean, oak and the ‘musical’ bamboo "classrooms" with exotic plants and herbs. There are also six dipping ponds filled with aquatic life and dragonflies. An allotment is kept for growing vegetables. It was opened in July 2006 by David Attenborough.
- Gurkha Memorial Garden - the Gurkha Memorial Garden was created in 1997 with generous funding from the Kadoorie Foundation of Hong Kong in memory of Horace Kadoorie. It is planted with a selection of Nepal's unique flora and plants originally collected as seed in Nepal. A chautara stands here, this is a stone feature that marks a traditional resting place for porters on the mountain trails of Nepal carrying goods on their backs in the typical conical wicker baskets, known as dokos. This chautara displays the badges of the 12 Ghurka regiments.
- The Heather Garden - contains a range of heathers, delightful trees and shrubs. This gives all year interest of both flower and foliage.
- Himalayan Valley - is lined with azaleas, rhododendrons, hydrangeas, pieris, and many other plants
- Hydrangea Walk - is planted with a selection of the mophead and lacecap forms of hydrangea macrophylla. There are also some hydrangea paniculata mixed with a variety of viburnums.
- Magnolia Avenue - forms an avenue running from the front of Jermyn's House. Established by Sir Harold, these magnolias are now fully mature.
- Meadows - contain common spotted orchid, dactylorhiza fuchsia, yellow rattle, rhinanthus minor.
- Peony Border - has around 70 different varieties of peony
- Pinetum- affectionately known in its early days as ‘Little Switzerland’ was planted in the 70's.
- The Pond - on the banks of the pond are several trees of swamp cypress (taxodium distichum). In the moist soil around the Pond, and in the Bog Garden, the lush foliage of numerous bamboos predominates, and herbaceous perennials.
- Rhododendron Woodland - with approximately 1,307 different types of rhododendron. Here is planted a champion specimen of quercus rysophylla, which was grown from seed collected by Sir Harold while in Mexico.
- Valley of Fire - lined with North American maples, sweet gum (liquidambar) and cherry trees. Shrub beds are planted with sumac and lindera
- Winter Garden - was opened by Michael Heseltine in 1998. It was extended in 2014 and now covers over 4 acres (1.6 ha), one of the largest winter gardens in Europe. The Winter Garden was intended to demonstrate sustainability principles and was formed using reclaimed soil blended with an organic compost (Pro-Grow) made from the composting of botanical garden waste from thousands of Hampshire gardens. Many recycled and reclaimed products were used in its construction, even the irrigation pipe incorporates recycled materials, in this case reconstituted baler twine. The Winter Garden has more than 800 plants grown for their winter beauty, planted to look their best between November and March. Planting features a palette of bark, bold coloured stems, scent and foliage. It features the National Collection of witch-hazel. Highlights to see in the spring including euphorbia, helleborus, lonicera and daphne.
- Wisteria Border - has 20 different wisteria

== Buildings ==
=== Visitor Pavilion ===
The pavilion was opened in 2003. The elegant single storey complex was designed by Hampshire County Council Architects, and has won the SCALA award for the best local authority designed building in the UK. The building is a complementary mix of modern and traditional materials. Dedicated to the memory of Queen Elizabeth The Queen Mother and visited in 2003 by the Queen. The Visitor Pavilion hosts a gallery space, ticket desk, membership desk, restaurant, gift shop and purpose-built education facility.

=== Jermyn’s House ===
The original house here could have been built in the early 18th century. The land in 1724 was owned by Farmer Jarman. After being used as a smallpox hospital and inoculation centre in the 18th century. It passed through a number of different owners until acquired at auction by the Hillier family in 1951. The family took up residence in June 1953. The building now houses the administrative offices for the Gardens, restaurant and tea rooms.

==== Herbarium ====
The Herbarium is located within Jermyn’s House and was founded in 1995 to accommodate specimens collected by Sir Harold Hillier. It was officially opened by Dr Nigel Taylor, Curator of the Royal Botanic Gardens, Kew. The Herbarium houses a particularly large collection of Quercus and it is the official repository for the International Oak Society. It holds around 8,000 specimens including specimens that are wild collected seeds or cuttings, from America, Australia, China, Japan, Malaysia, Mexico, New Zealand, South Korea and Taiwan. It is open for research purposes by appointment.
