= Ulmus minor 'Dehesa de la Villa' =

Elm cultivar

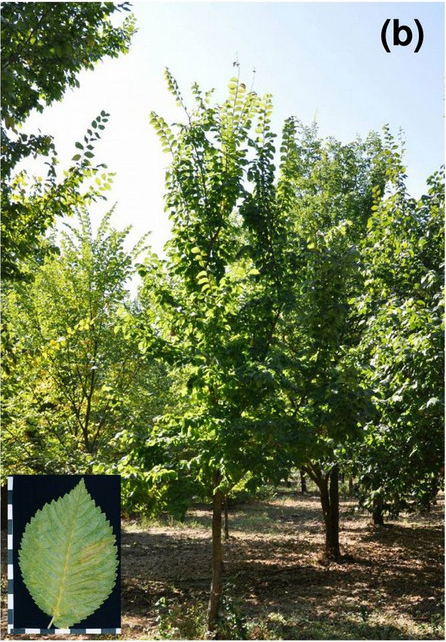
- 'Dehesa de la Villa'
- Species: Ulmus minor
- Cultivar: 'Dehesa de la Villa'
- Origin: Spain

The Field Elm cultivar Ulmus minor 'Dehesa de la Villa' was cloned by root cuttings from a tree growing in the eponymous park within the Moncloa-Aravaca district of north-west Madrid (40°27′29″N 3°44′0″W), by researchers at the Escuela Técnica Superior de Ingenieros de Montes, Universidad Politėcnica de Madrid in 1990.

'Dehesa de la Villa' was introduced to the UK in 2017, by Hampshire & Isle of Wight Branch, Butterfly Conservation, as part of an assessment of DED-resistant cultivars as potential hosts of the endangered White-letter Hairstreak.

== Description ==
In the trials at Puerta de Hierro, Madrid, "Dehesa de la Villa" grew monopodially at a relatively slow rate of 63 cm per year. Corky tissue is present on branches. The leaves, on 6 mm petioles, are elliptic, typically acuminate at the apex, the average length and width 55 × 36 mm, the margins doubly serrate. Foliar density relative to 'Sapporo Autumn Gold' is described as 'high'. In the Madrid study, the appearance of the tree was rated 4.3 / 5. The tree was the first of the Madrid clones to leaf in southern England, flushing in the first week of April. Where grown on fertile loam at the Grange Farm Arboretum in Lincolnshire, the tree attained sexual maturity aged six years, and also commenced suckering from roots.

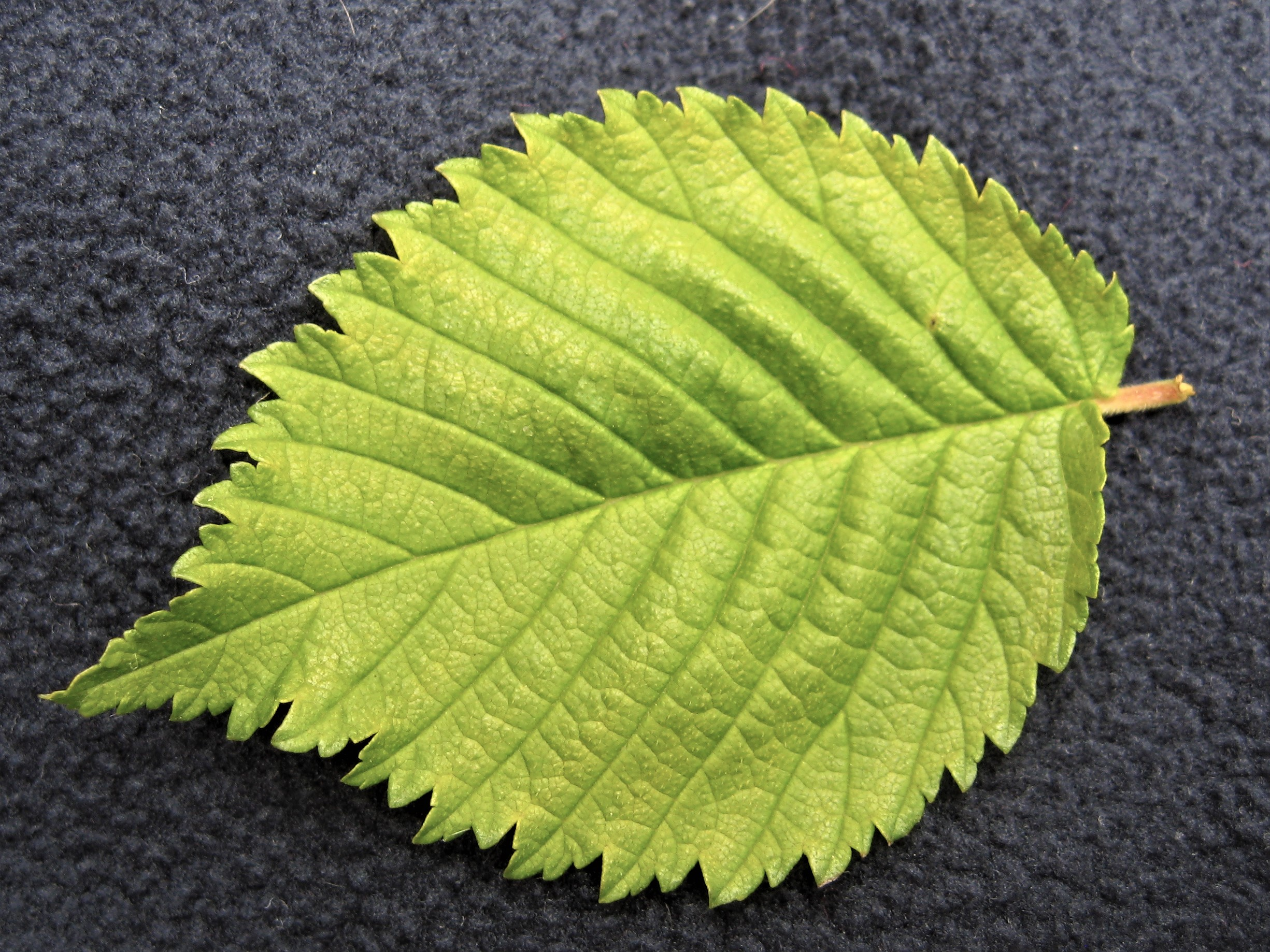
Leaf

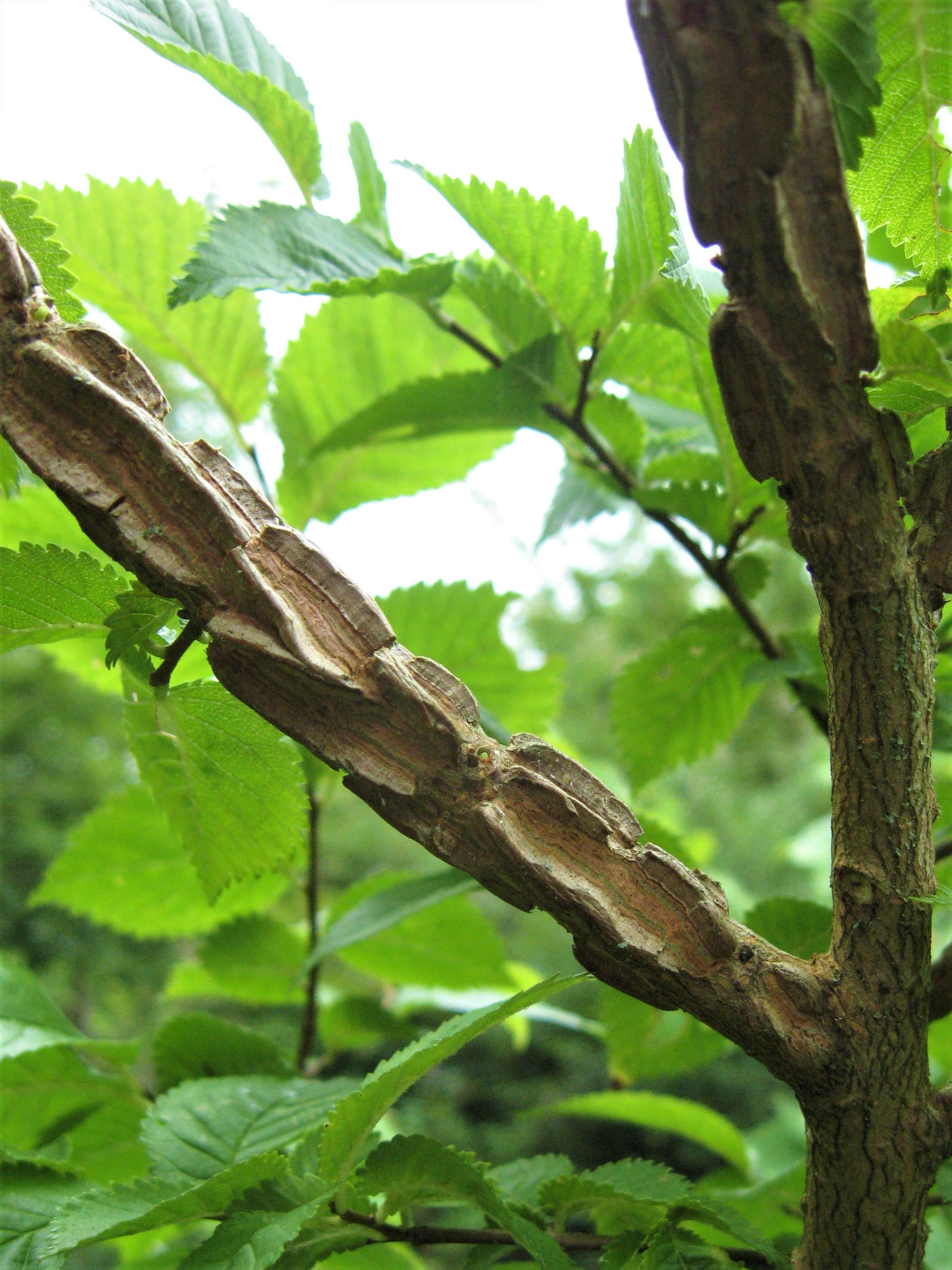
Corky-winged bark

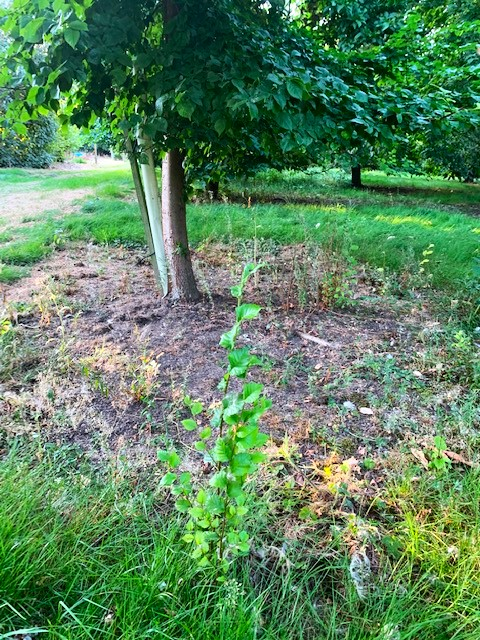
'Dehesa de la Villa' suckering from roots

== Pests and diseases ==
'Dehesa de la Villa' is one of the two Madrid U. minor cultivars found to have a very high resistance to Dutch Elm Disease, on a par with, if not greater than, the hybrid cultivar 'Sapporo Autumn Gold'. However, the tree is known to be particularly attractive to scolytidae, causing serious defoliation.

== Cultivation ==
The cultivar is (2025) undergoing further trials in different environments in Spain, where it was first tested for disease resistance by inoculation in 2009. If resistance remains satisfactory, the tree will be released to commerce under licence.

== Accessions ==
=== Europe ===
- Grange Farm Arboretum, Lincolnshire, UK. Acc. no. 1265. One small whip planted 2017.
- Great Fontley Farm, Hampshire, UK. Butterfly Conservation elm trial plantation. One small whip planted 2017.
- Sir Harold Hillier Gardens, Hampshire, UK. Acc. no. 2018.0021
