= Ulmus 'Night Rider' =

Elm cultivar

- Genus: Ulmus
- Hybrid parentage: (U. davidiana var. japonica × U. pumila) × U. davidiana var. japonica
- Cultivar: 'Night Rider'
- Origin: Canada

Ulmus 'Night Rider' is a hybrid elm cultivar raised from a crossing of 'Sapporo Autumn Gold' (female parent, a cross between Japanese elm and Siberian elm) and Japanese elm (male parent), by Rick Durand of the Prairie Shade Nursery in Portage la Prairie, Manitoba, c.2013. Notable for its high resistance to Dutch elm disease and for its purple fall leaves, it was released by Durand in 2020 at Bylands Nurseries, West Kelowna, British Columbia, as one of Bylands' research program elms. Durand was one of the partners who raised the Japanese elm cultivars 'Discovery' and 'Freedom'.

Purple fall leaves are rare in elms, where yellow is the norm. Cultivars with burgundy fall leaves include 'Frontier' and 'Burgundy Glow' = Northern Empress.

== Description ==
A fast growing elm, adding 2 to 3 ft. a year, attaining about 35 ft. tall and wide, and developing a rounded vase shape. The seed is central in a narrow-winged samara smaller than that of Siberian elm. Leaves are glossy dark green and rough-toothed, intermediate between the parent species, about 4 to 5 in. long by 1.5 to 2 in. wide, with 10 to 12 vein-pairs; fall colour is orange-red to predominantly purple, with occasional yellow. North Dakota State University wrote (November 2023): "Early evaluations indicate good cold hardiness and excellent burgundy fall colour. However, caution should be exercised as this cultivar appears to have heavy seed production". Seed-production on individual elms, however, varies from year to year, with heavy seeding often followed by lean years, owing to natural cycles and to environmental factors. Durand describes the seed production of 'Night Rider' as "sparse" compared with that of Siberian elm.

== Pests and diseases ==
'Night Rider', being 75 per cent Japanese elm and 25 per cent Siberian, is highly resistant to Dutch elm disease, showing less than 15 per cent damage from DED after inoculation. "The damage on 'Night Rider' is typical for Asian elms," noted Durand. "When the Asian elms get the disease, their response is not always immediate, but they quickly 'wall off' the infection" (i.e. the affected portion dies but the rest of the tree survives). By comparison, 'Burgundy Glow' = Northern Empress Japanese elm, which was developed at North Dakota State University, lost approximately 50 to 60 per cent of its branches before it 'walled off' the DED infection.

== Cultivation ==
'Night Rider' is one of the Bylands research elms planted at the DED project site at Futura Farms, Saint Andrews, Selkirk, Manitoba. These are also being assessed in five trials across different regions of the prairies: three in Alberta (Strathmore, Red Deer and Edmonton), one in Saskatoon and one at Jeffries Nursery in Portage la Prairie. The trees are being planted in urban areas and evaluated for their disease resistance and cold hardiness to the prairie climate.

'Night Rider' is not known to be in cultivation beyond Canada and North Dakota.

== Nurseries ==
North America

- Morden Nurseries, Morden, Manitoba
- Falk Nurseries, New Bothwell, Manitoba
