= Ulmus × hollandica 'Dehesa de Amaniel' =

Elm cultivar

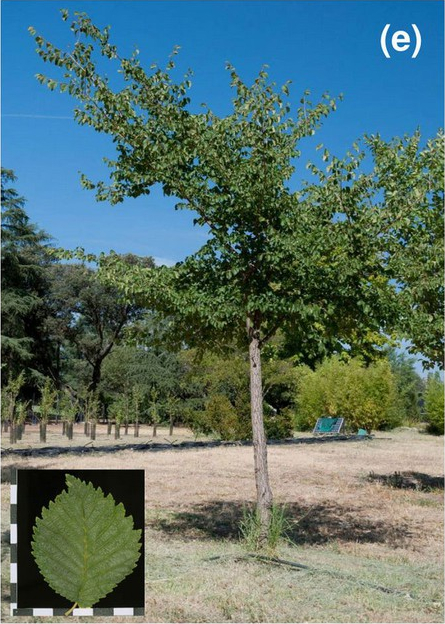
- 'Dehesa de Amaniel'
- Genus: Ulmus
- Species: Ulmus × hollandica
- Cultivar: 'Dehesa de Amaniel'
- Origin: Spain

The hybrid elm cultivar Ulmus × hollandica 'Dehesa de Amaniel' was raised from seed collected in 1999 from a tree growing in the Dehesa de la Villa park (40°27′37″N 3°43′17″W), within the Moncloa-Aravaca district of north-west Madrid by researchers at the Escuela Técnica Superior de Ingenieros de Montes, Universidad Politėcnica de Madrid. 'Dehesa de Amaniel' is one of a number of Spanish elms found to have a high resistance to Dutch Elm Disease, on a par with, if not greater than, the hybrid cultivar 'Sapporo Autumn Gold'.

'Dehesa de Amaniel' was introduced to the UK in 2015 by Hampshire & Isle of Wight Branch, Butterfly Conservation, as part of an assessment of DED-resistant cultivars as potential hosts of the endangered White-letter Hairstreak.

== Description ==
'Dehesa de Amaniel' grew at a comparatively fast rate of 90 cm per annum at the Puerta de Hierro nursery in Madrid. The spreading branches, which have corky tissue, form an irregular crown. The leaves, on 2.5 mm petioles, are round, typically acuminate at the apex, the average length and width 39 × 30 mm, the margins triple-serrate. The leaves are relatively sparsely distributed along the branchlets, and suffused dark-red on emergence, distinguishing them from the other selected Madrid clones. Foliar density relative to 'Sapporo Autumn Gold' is described as 'high'. However, in the Madrid study, the appearance of the tree was rated 3 / 5, the lowest score of all the trialled cultivars. The tree is weak-wooded, and where planted in exposed locations has suffered extensive branch breakage.

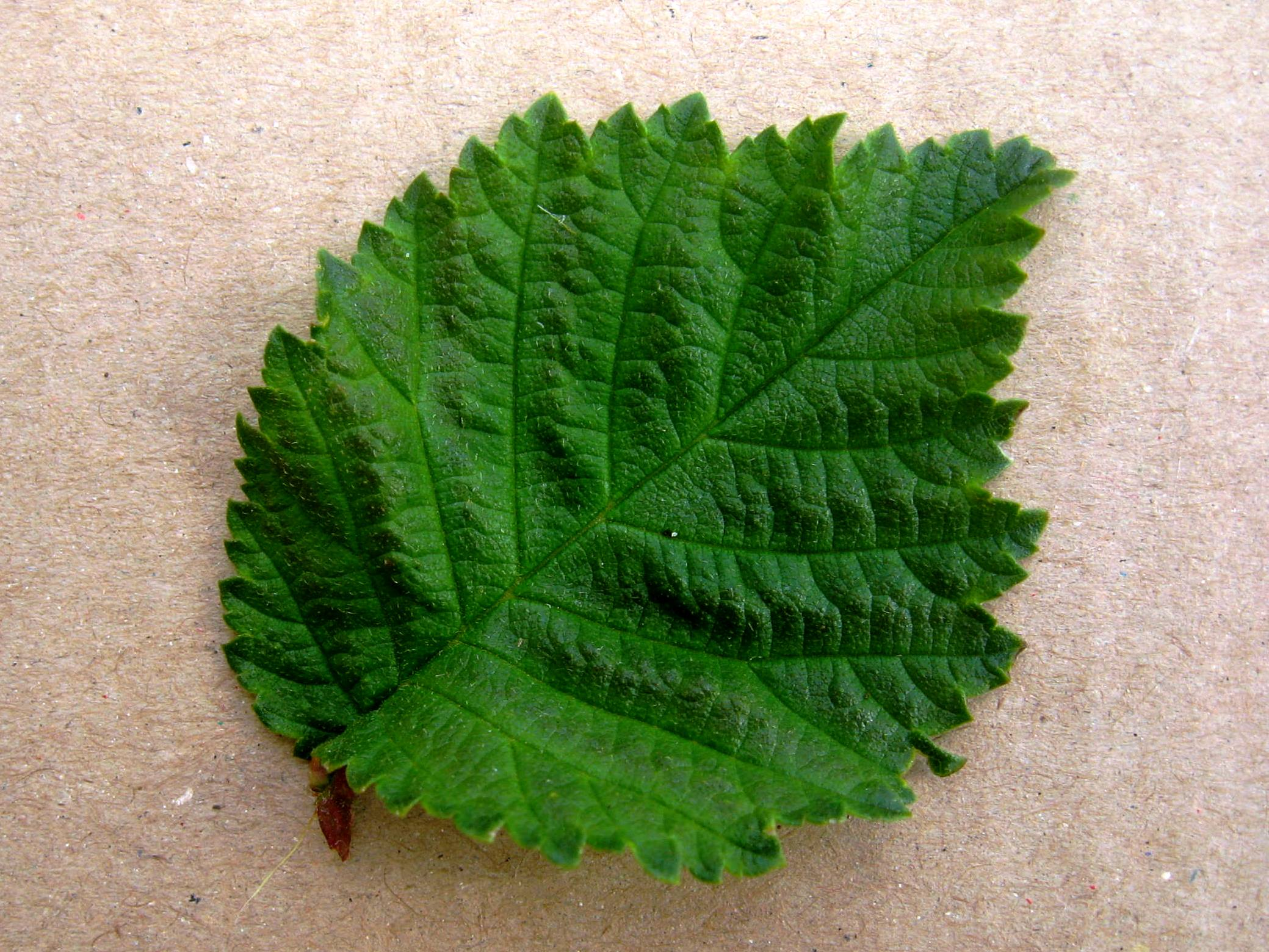
'Dehesa de Amaniel' leaf

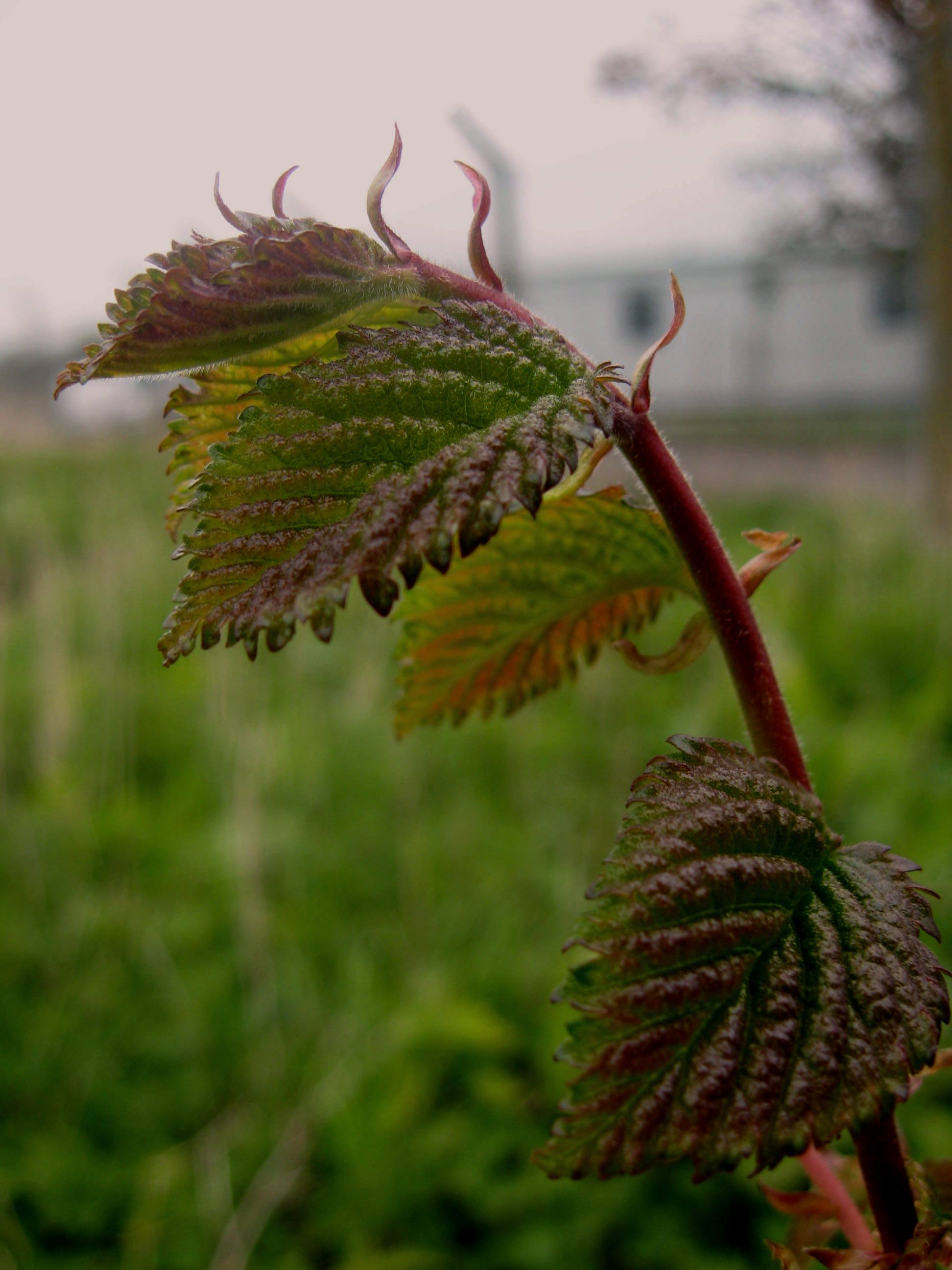
Emergent foliage colour

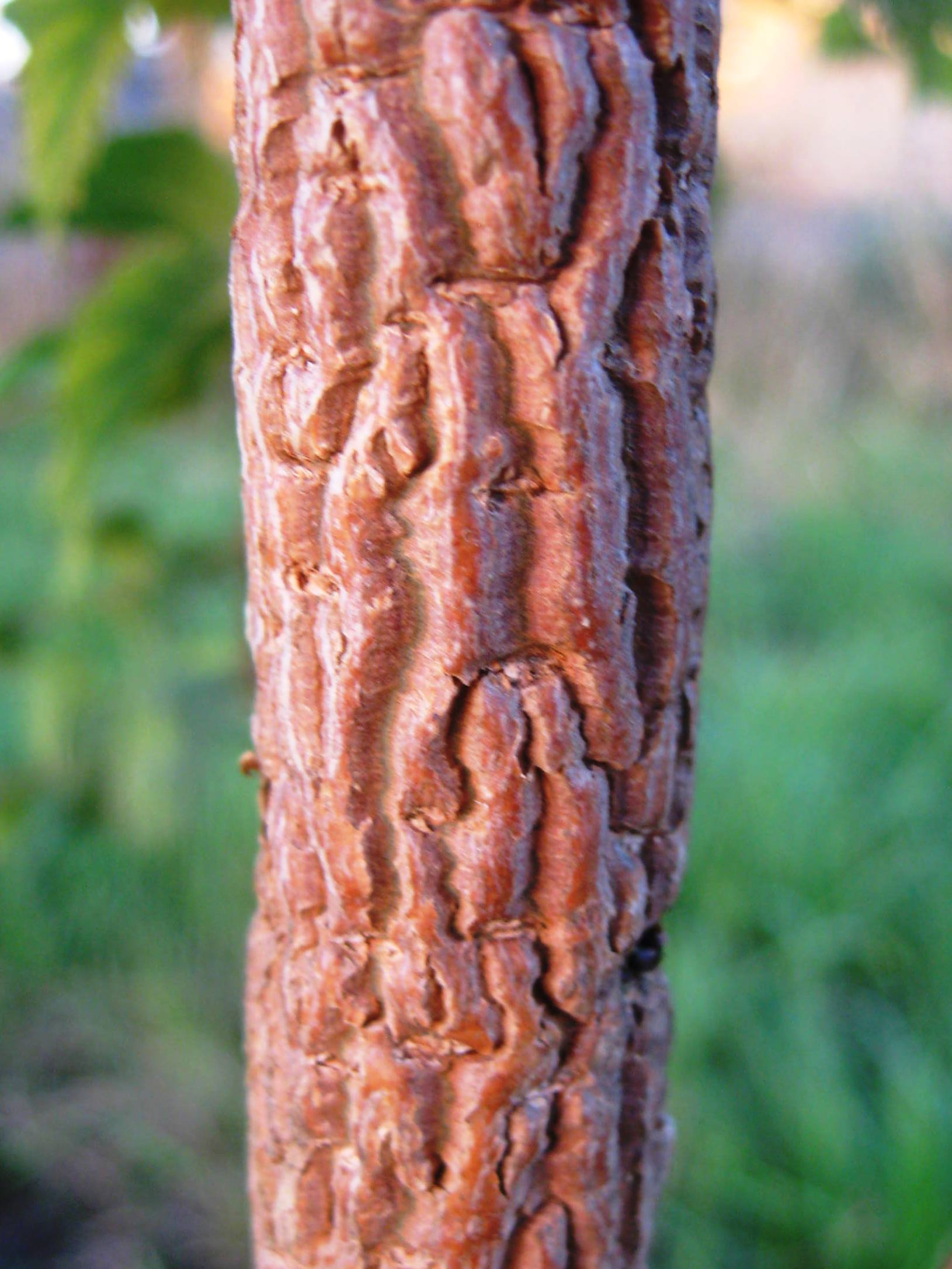
Corky bark

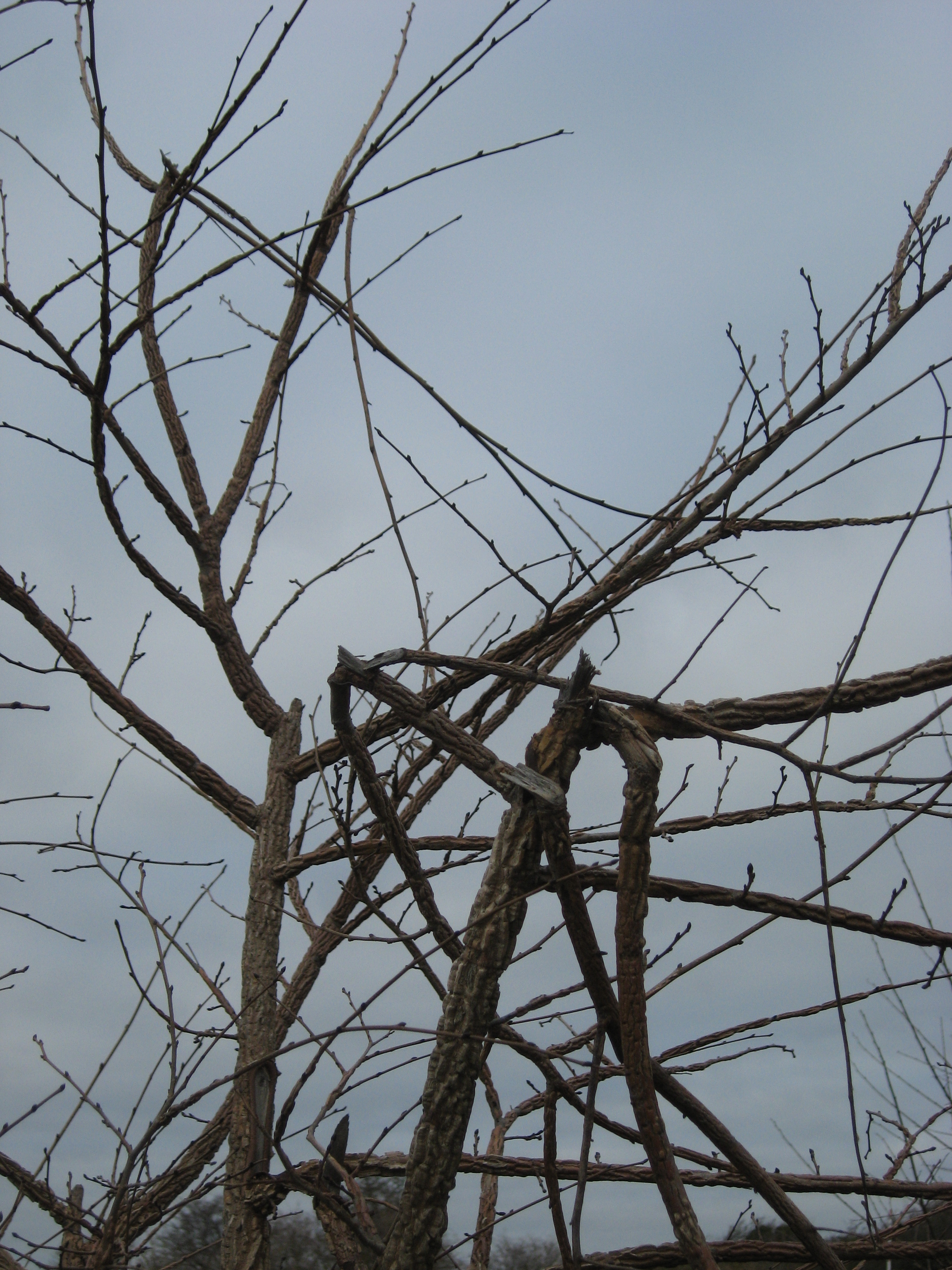
Storm damage, UK

== Pests and diseases ==
'Dehesa de Amaniel' was the most resistant of the Spanish elm clones to Dutch elm disease, with wilting values below 5% during the two consecutive inoculation trials performed in Madrid. However, in inoculation trials in England in 2019 by the late Dr David Herling, the tree exhibited 40% defoliation after three months.

== Cultivation ==
'Dehesa de Amaniel' is undergoing further trials in other, different, environments in Spain, where it was tested by inoculation in 2016. If the performance of the cultivar remains satisfactory, the tree will be released to commerce under licence. 'Dehesa de Amaniel' was also being assessed as part of Butterfly Conservation's elm trials in southern Hampshire, England, but was withdrawn owing to severe storm damage and susceptibility to Dutch elm disease in the field.

== Accessions ==
- Grange Farm Arboretum, Lincolnshire, UK. Acc. no 1132. One small whip planted 2015.

== Etymology ==
The tree's name commemorates the former owner of Dehesa (:'grassland') de la Villa, Lope de Amaniel, ballestero of Henry II of Castile.
