= Ulmus × hollandica 'Majadahonda' =

Elm cultivar

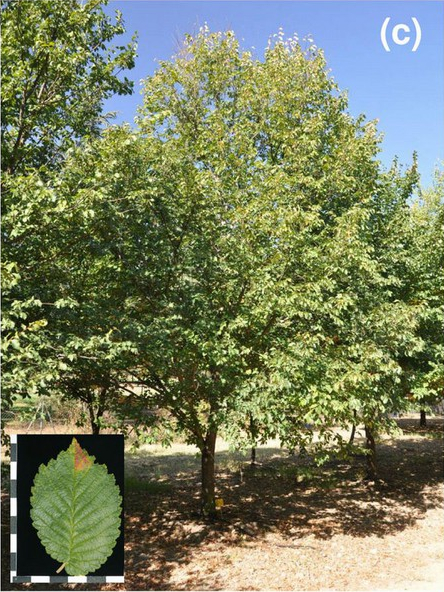
- 'Majadahonda'
- Genus: Ulmus
- Cultivar: 'Majadahonda'
- Origin: Spain

The cultivar Ulmus × hollandica 'Majadahonda' was cloned by grafting scions from a tree found growing in the suburb of Majadahonda, 16 km north-west of Madrid, by researchers at the Escuela Técnica Superior de Ingenieros de Montes, Universidad Politėcnica de Madrid in 1993. The tree is one of a number found to have a very high resistance to Dutch Elm Disease, on a par with, if not greater than, the hybrid cultivar 'Sapporo Autumn Gold' in the Madrid study, where the appearance of the tree was rated 4.1 / 5.

'Majadahonda' was introduced to the UK in 2016, by Hampshire & Isle of Wight Branch, Butterfly Conservation, as part of an assessment of DED-resistant cultivars as potential hosts of the endangered White-letter Hairstreak.

== Description ==
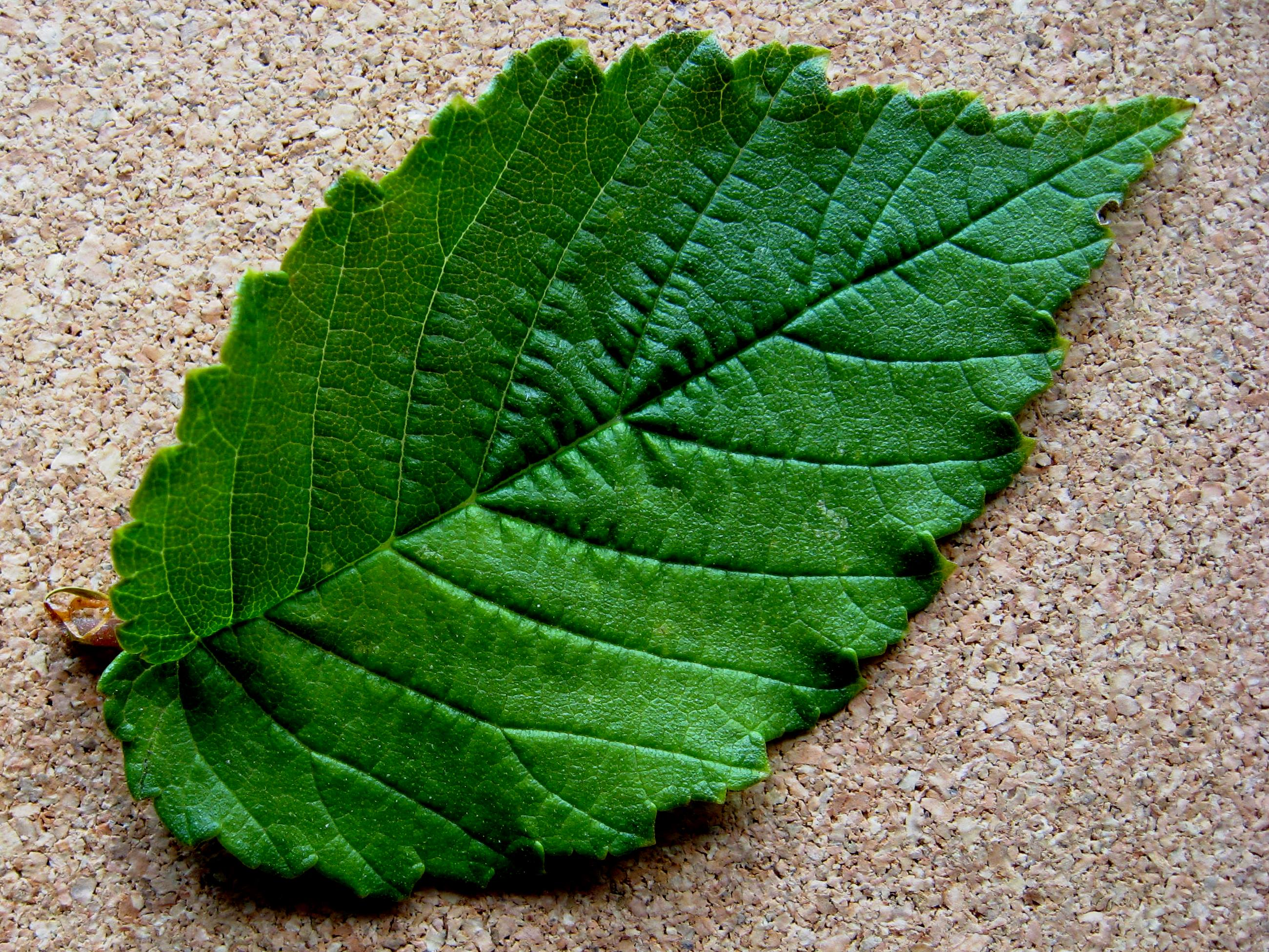

'Majadahonda' grew at a modest rate of 61 cm per annum in the trials at Puerta de Hierro, Madrid. The branches, devoid of corky tissue, form a rounded crown. The leaves, on comparatively long 11 mm petioles, are elliptic, typically acuminate at the apex, the average length and width 50 × 29 mm, the margins distinctively simply serrate. Foliar density relative to 'Sapporo Autumn Gold' is described as 'high'. 'Majadahonda' had the latest leaf bud-burst phenology of the seven clones, in mid-April, with leaves not fully expanded until the end of April in Spain, (mid May in southern England. Specimens grown in southern England attained sexual maturity aged six years, commencing flowering in week 8.

== Pests and diseases ==
'Majadahonda' is one of the seven Madrid cultivars found to have a very high resistance to Dutch Elm Disease, on a par with, if not greater than, the hybrid cultivar 'Sapporo Autumn Gold' when inoculated with the pathogen. However, with trees 'in the field' in England, exposed to natural infection by Dutch Elm Disease throughout the summer, resistance has not been so high, and specimens at two locations have been seriously afflicted.

== Cultivation ==
The cultivar underwent further trials in different environments in Spain, where it was again tested by inoculation in 2018. If resistance remains satisfactory, the tree may be released to commerce under licence. The tree is unusual in that it cannot be propagated from cuttings as they do not callus, and is most commonly propagated by root cuttings.

== Accessions ==
=== Europe ===
- Grange Farm Arboretum, Lincolnshire, UK. Acc. no. 1267. One small whip planted 2016.
