= Ulmus davidiana var. japonica 'Burgundy Glow' =

Elm cultivar

- Variety: Ulmus davidiana var. japonica
- Cultivar: 'Burgundy Glow' = Northern Empress
- Origin: US

The Japanese elm cultivar Ulmus davidiana var. japonica 'Burgundy Glow' (sold as Northern Empress) was raised from a 1978 seed batch from Heilongjiang Province, China, selected at North Dakota State University Dale E. Herman Research Arboretum, Absaraka, described in 2017, and released in 2021. It is notable for its burgundy fall colour, rare in elms where yellow is the norm, for its cold-hardiness, and for its "good" resistance to Dutch elm disease.

NDSU report it superior in cold-hardiness to the hybrid cultivar 'Frontier', which also has wine-coloured autumn foliage.

== Description ==
Northern Empress attains a height of about 28 ft. and a spread of about 24 ft. after 35 years, being smaller in stature than the species type, and develops a rounded open crown. The cultivar has medium green leaves colouring from apricot to rich burgundy before leaf-fall. The smooth grey-brown bark begins to fissure vertically with orange tinges after the first few years of growth. Seed production is light.

== Pests and diseases ==
The cultivar has the level of resistance to Dutch elm disease characteristic of the species. Minimally affected by black leaf spot.

== Cultivation ==
The tree was recommended for cultivation in North Dakota, though reportedly "production numbers were lower than planned" (2021). Northern Empress is tolerant of high pH levels. The species does not sucker from roots.

== Accessions ==
- NDSU Dale E. Herman Research Arboretum

== Nurseries ==
North America

- Bailey Nurseries, North Dakota, US
- Morden Nurseries, Morden, Manitoba
