= Ulmus 'Sapporo Autumn Gold' =

Elm cultivar

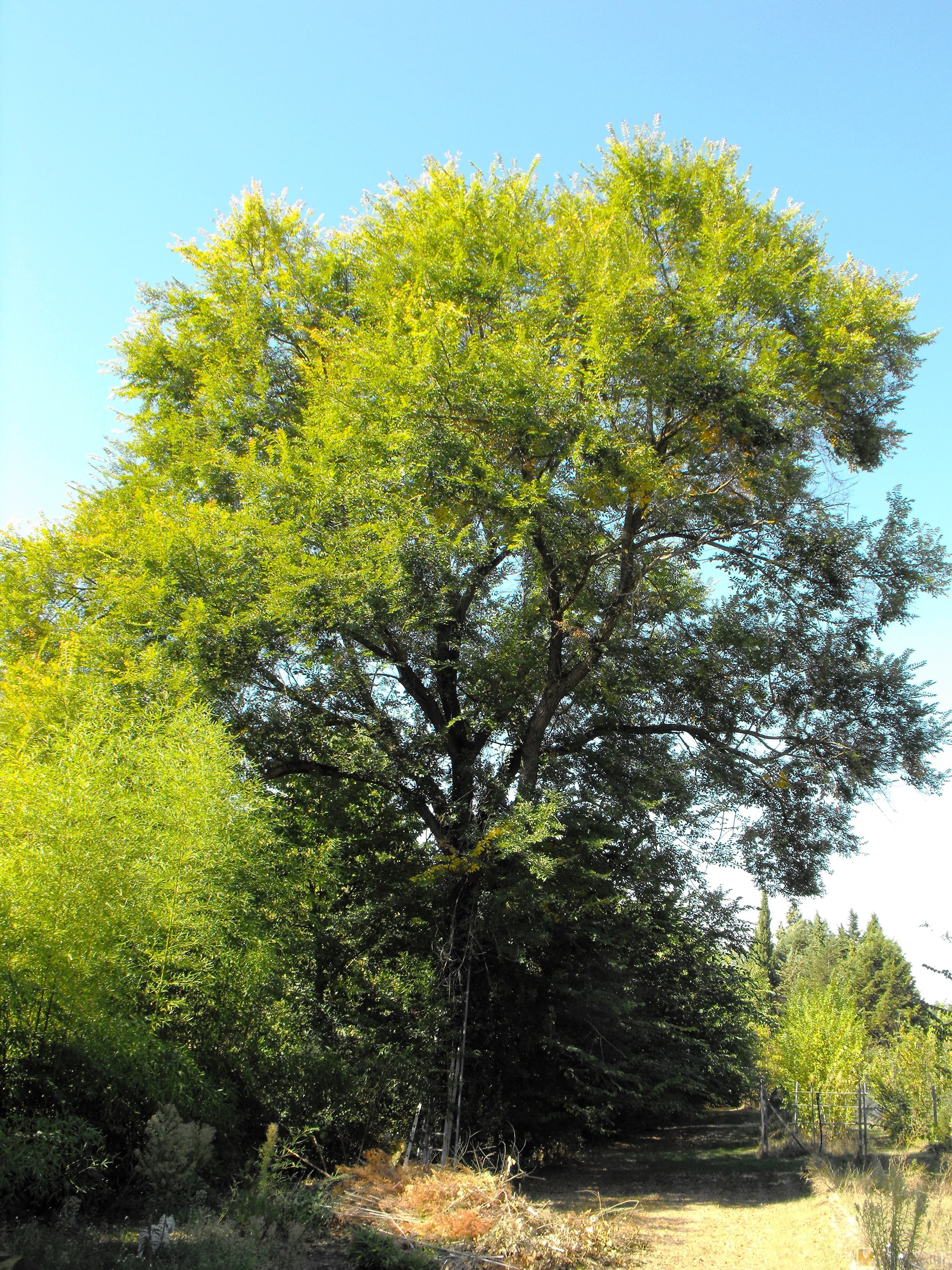
- 'Sapporo Autumn Gold' at Antella, Florence, believed to be the largest in Europe.
- Genus: Ulmus
- Hybrid parentage: U. davidiana var. japonica × U. pumila
- Cultivar: 'Sapporo Autumn Gold'
- Origin: seeds: Sapporo, Japan; cultivated: United States

Ulmus 'Sapporo Autumn Gold' is one of the most commercially successful hybrid elm cultivars ever marketed, widely planted across North America and western Europe, although it has now been largely supplanted by more recent introductions. Arising from a chance crossing of the Japanese elm (female parent) and Siberian elm, seed was sent in 1958 by Prof. Nobuku Takahashi and his colleagues at the Sapporo Botanical Garden of Hokkaido University, Sapporo, to Eugene Smalley at the University of Wisconsin–Madison. The patent issued in 1975 has expired, and there are now no propagation restrictions. However, the tree has proven weak-wooded on maturity, and its popularity has waned in Europe as a consequence of susceptibility to wind damage.

== Description ==
The tree usually forks at 1.5–2 m from the ground to produce a broad, rounded, densely foliated crown, though immature plants produce vigorous side shoots requiring assiduous pruning to maintain shape. The bark is pale grey, and longitudinally fissured to form a random lattice pattern. The leaves are narrowly elliptical, < 9 cm long by < 4.5 cm wide, with 8 mm petioles. As the name implies, the leaves turn pale yellow in autumn. The perfect, apetalous wind-pollinated flowers appear in early March, followed by the seeds in April; flowering usually begins when the tree is aged six years.

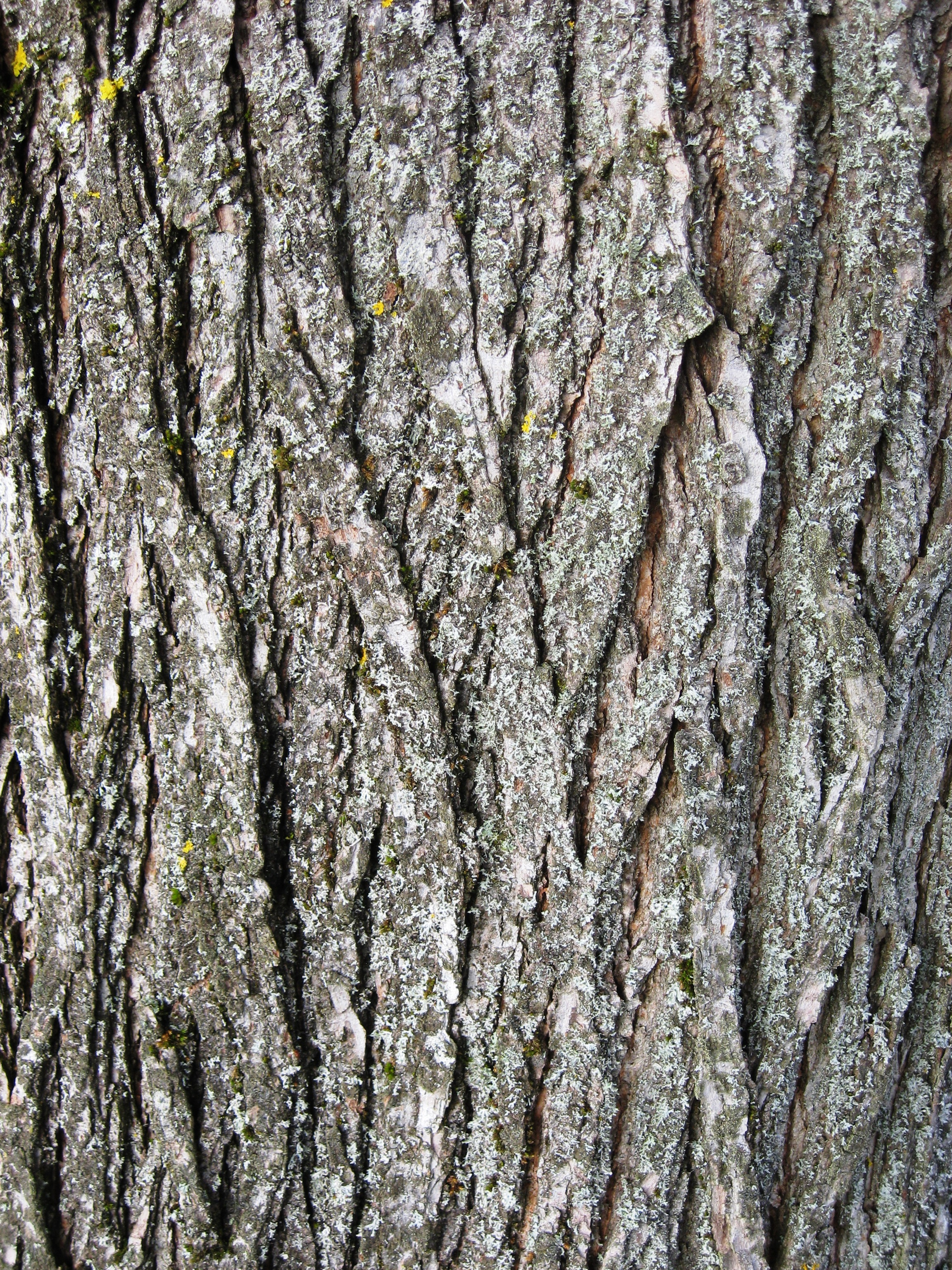
Bark of 30-year-old tree

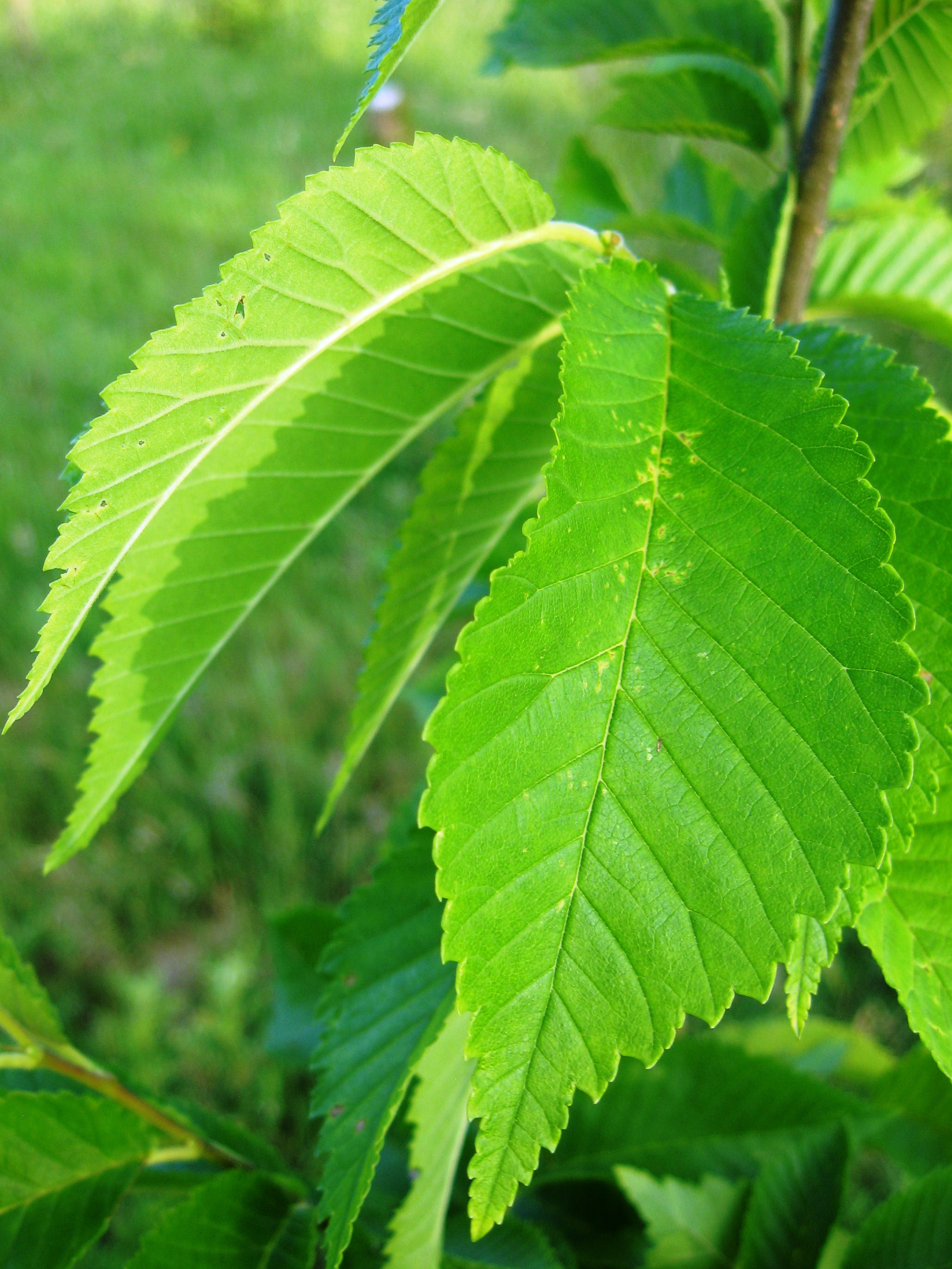
Foliage

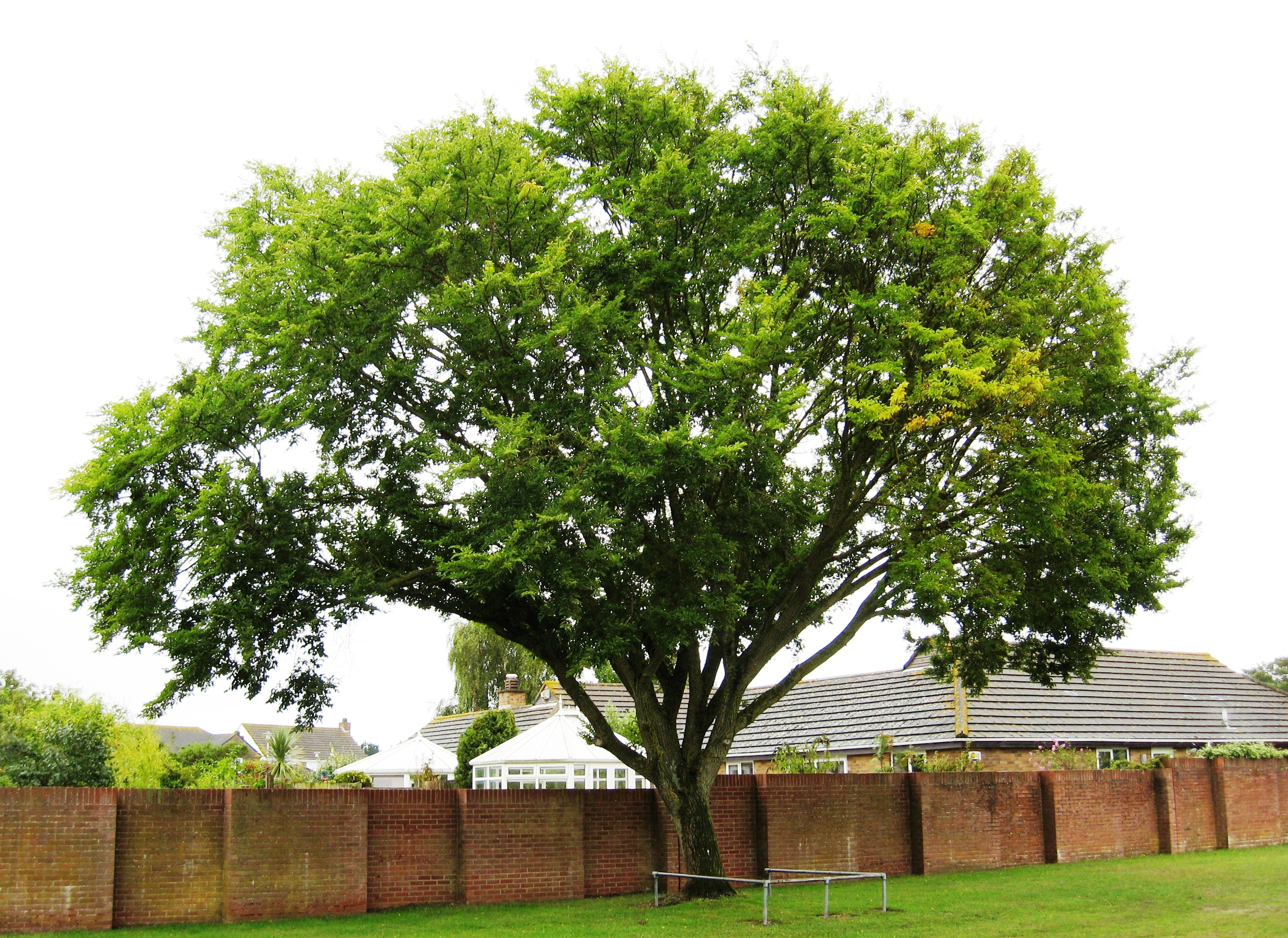
Coastal tree, Mude-ford, UK, felled 2017 (storm damage)

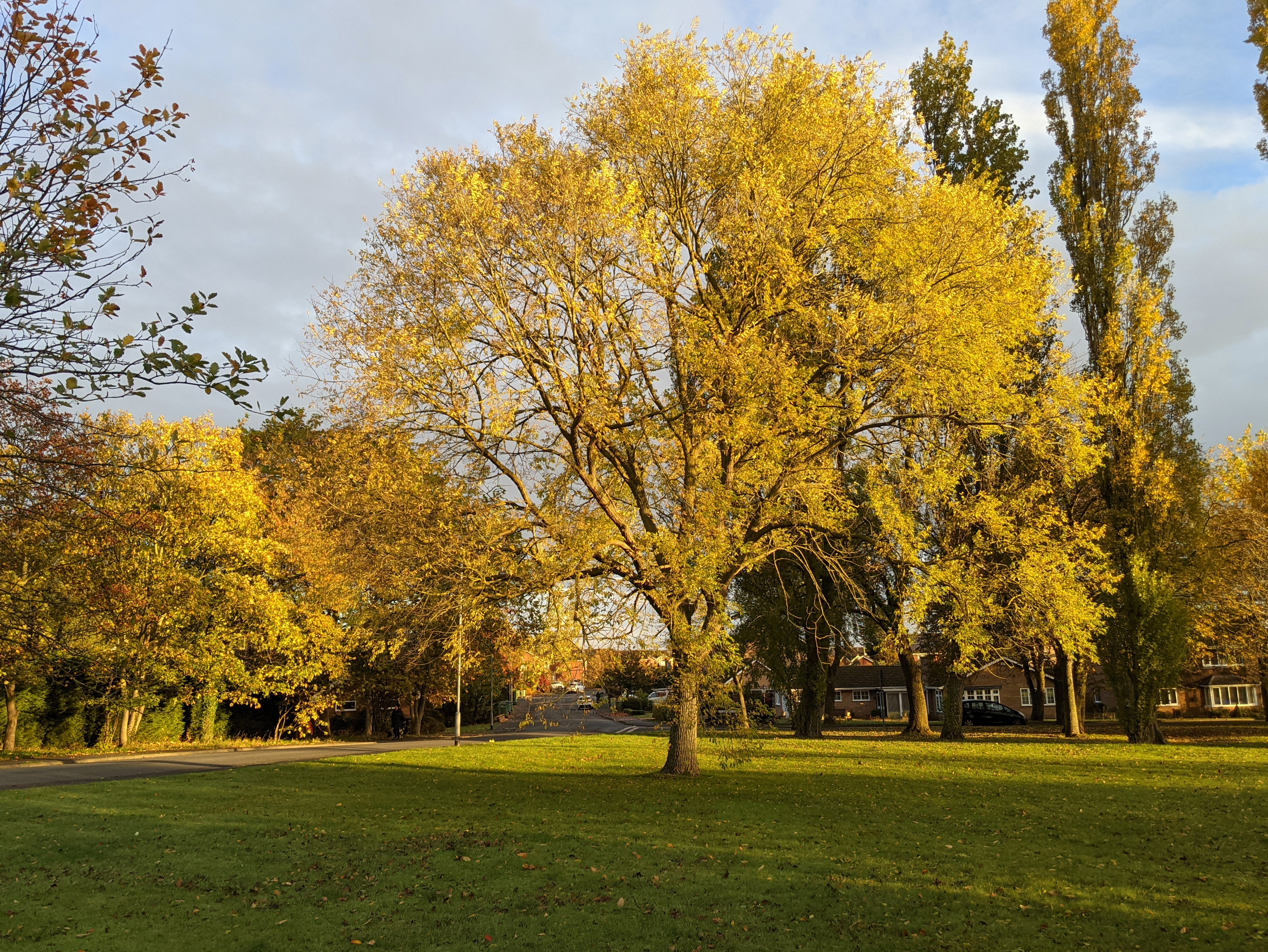
Autumn colour, Bourne, Lincolnshire, UK

== Pests and diseases ==
'Sapporo Autumn Gold' possesses a very high resistance to Dutch elm disease; in trials in Italy, it sustained only 2.8% defoliation and 1.2% dieback when inoculated with unnaturally high concentrations of the fungal pathogen. The cultivar also has a tolerance of Verticillium wilt. The tree's foliage was adjudged 'resistant' to black spot by the Plant Diagnostic Clinic of the University of Missouri, however it can be severely damaged by the elm leaf beetle (Xanthogaleruca luteola) in the United States Several mature specimens near the Hampshire coast in England have become (2014) afflicted by Dryad's saddle fungus (Polyporus squamosus).

== Cultivation ==
In favourable conditions; notably a moist, well-drained soil, the tree can grow at a rate of almost one metre per year. Trials by the Northern Arizona University found that it is not very tolerant of a hot, arid climate although its leaves sustained comparatively little scorch damage. In trials in southern England conducted by Butterfly Conservation, the tree was found to be intolerant of ponding overwinter. 'Sapporo Autumn Gold' was first introduced to the UK by technology company Pitney Bowes as part of its 'Elms Across Europe' campaign. The company supplied the cultivar to schools, parks and gardens throughout the UK and Europe. The tree remains popular in continental Europe but does not assimilate well in the countryside. In trials in France by Cemagref at Nogent-sur-Vernisson, Loiret, it was found to grow too vigorously in hedgerow conditions, eclipsing neighbouring shrubs and consequently creating gaps. In rich soils in the Netherlands the tree grows too fast and has poor wind resistance, whereas in poor, dry conditions growth is slower and more robust.

The hybrid was included in trials in Canberra, Australia started in 1988, but has not performed well there.

In the UK, 'Sapporo Autumn Gold' has been found to host the endangered white-letter hairstreak butterfly (Satyrium w-album), whose larvae feed exclusively on elm.

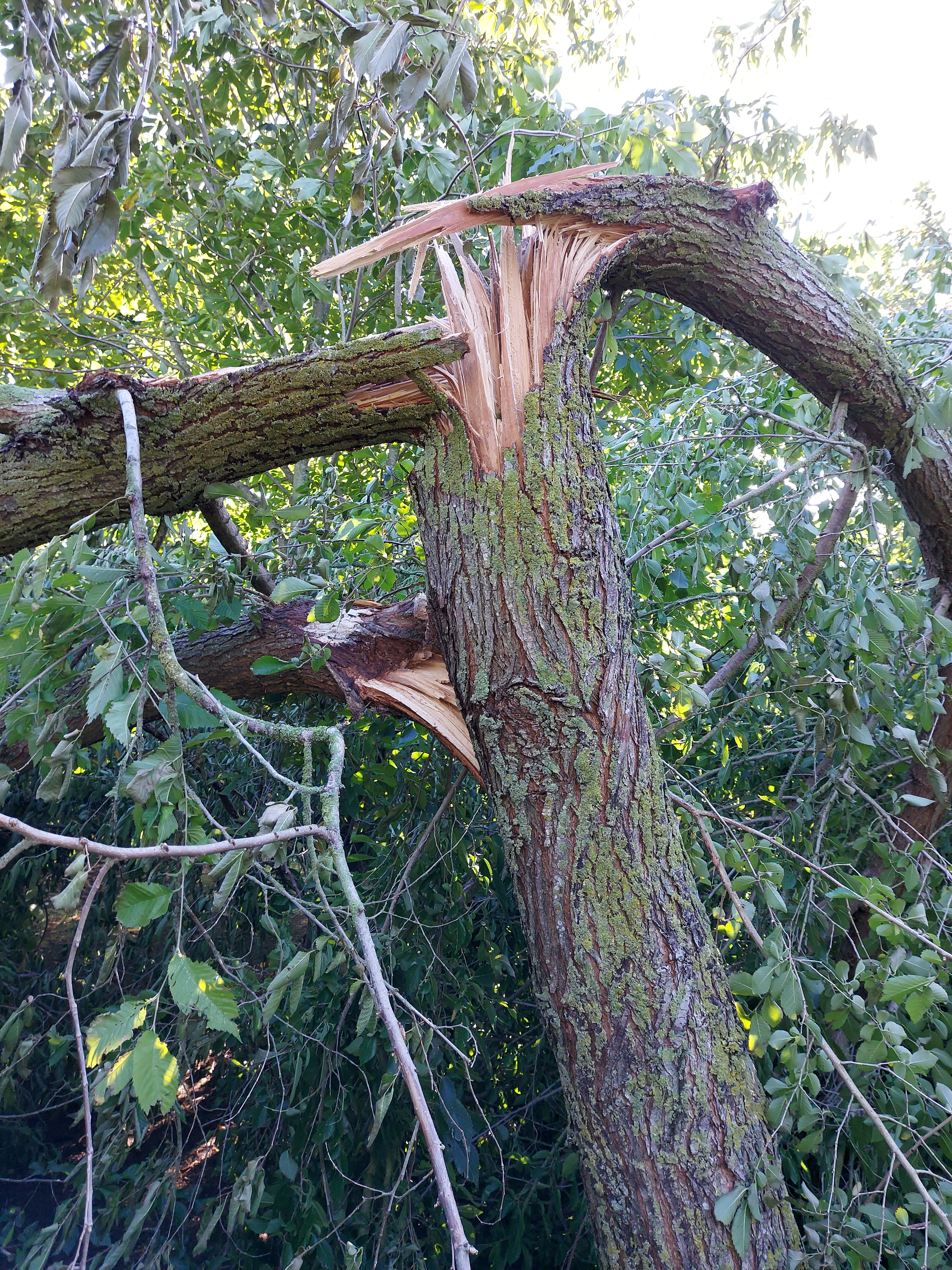
Damage sustained during Force 8 gale, Lincs. (2020)

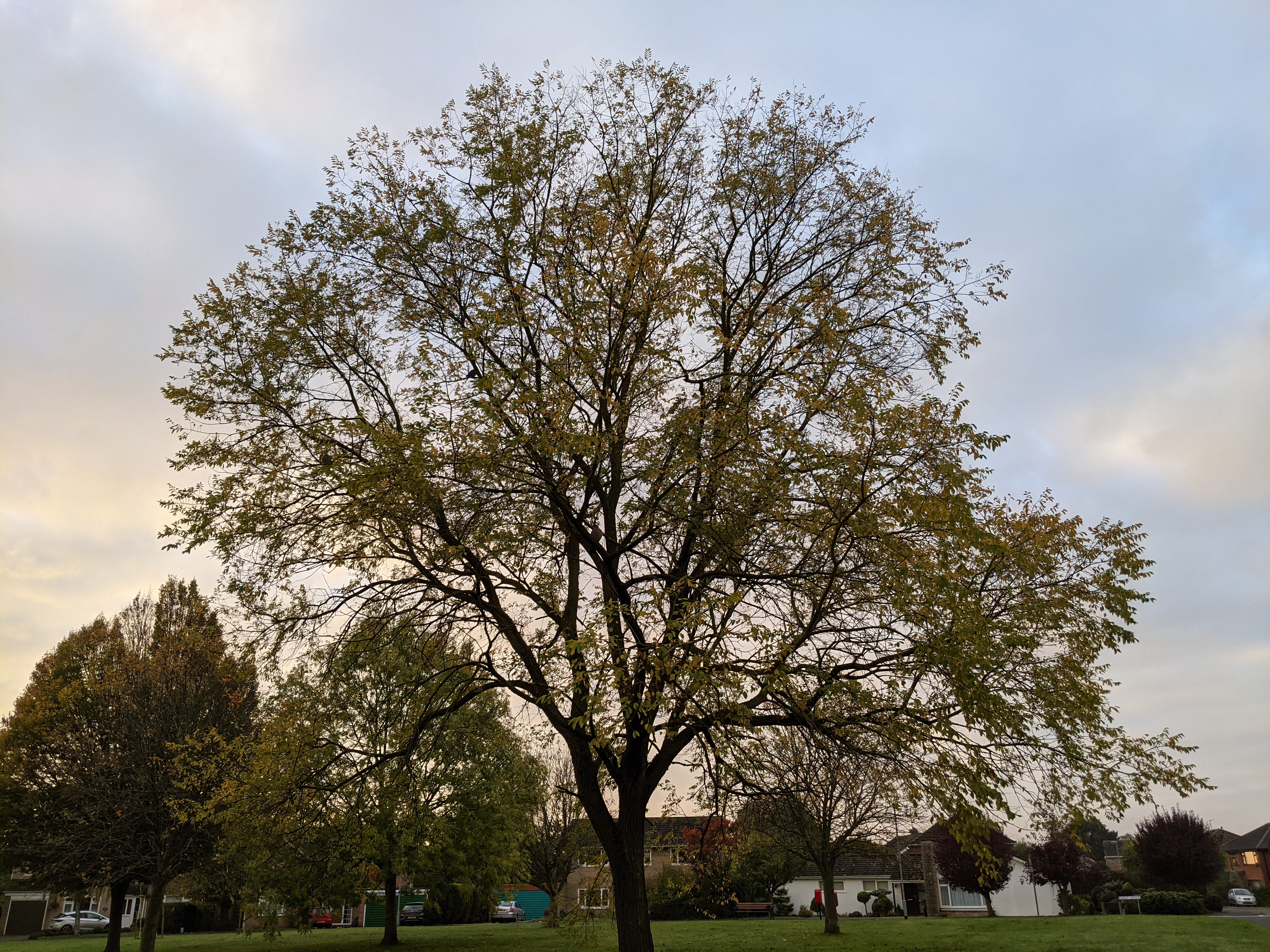
Branching of 'Sapporo AG', Bourne, Lincs. (2021)

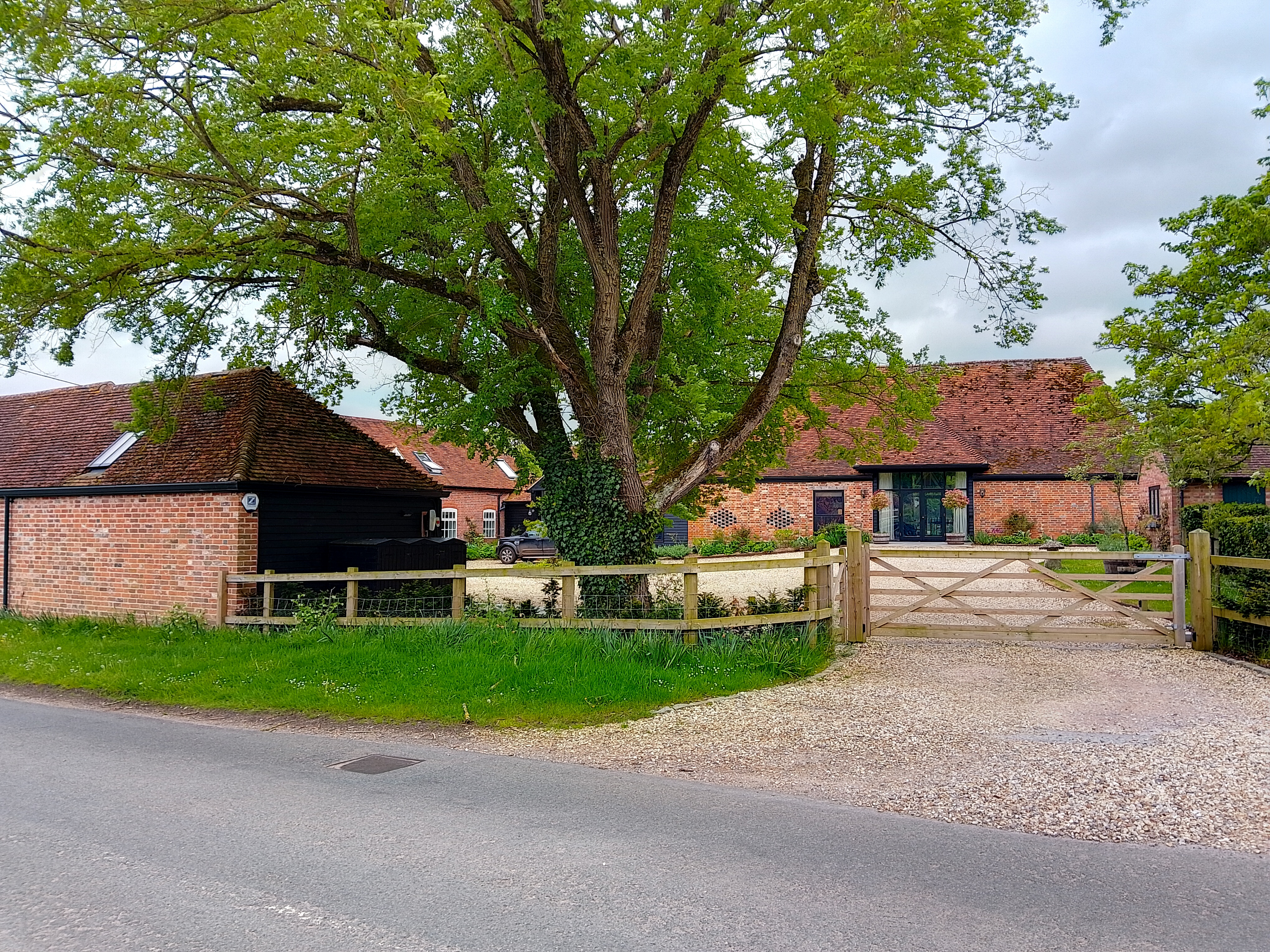
'Sapporo AG', Hamstead Marshall, Berkshire (2023)

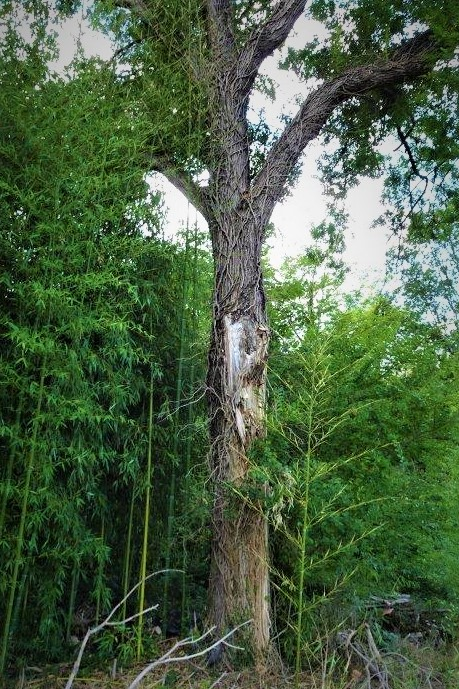
Trunk damage caused by major limb loss, Antella, Italy (2020)

== Notable trees ==
The very first tree planted in the UK in 1979 at the Pitney Bowes technology company by Denis Thatcher (where he was a director), survived in perfect health as of 2012; however Poundland now occupy the site and the land was flattened in 2013/2014. Of five trees planted in 1980 on the green in Clifton, one survives (2016), the others having suffered "catastrophic branch collapse" in storms. Other notable plantings were as street trees across Bexhill-on-Sea, East Sussex in late 1980s, and as riverside trees along the Ouse in York (from Lendal Bridge to Clifton Ings). The largest specimen in Europe known to Dutch elm expert Hans M. Heybroek grows at the Istituto per la Protezione delle Piante's Monna Giovanella nursery at Antella, near Florence (see Infobox photo), but this too was badly damaged by a storm in 2020.

== Hybrid cultivars ==
- 'Night Rider'

== Synonymy ==
- Shapiro Autumn Gold: Whitcomb, C. E. Know it and grow it, p. 171, 1976, missprint for 'Sapporo'.

== Accessions ==
=== North America ===
- Bartlett Tree Experts, US. Acc. nos. 88–1153, 88–1154
- Dominion Arboretum, Ottawa, Canada. No acc. details.
- Holden Arboretum, US. Acc. no. 91–79

=== Europe ===
- Arboretum de La Petite Loiterie , Monthodon, France. No details available.
- Brighton & Hove City Council, UK. NCCPG Elm Collection. Examples in Blakers Park, Stanmer Park, Preston Park and Woodvale cemetery.
- Cambridge Botanic Garden , University of Cambridge, UK. No accession details available.
- Grange Farm Arboretum, Sutton St James, Spalding, Lincolnshire, UK. Acc. no. not known.
- National Botanic Gardens , Glasnevin, Dublin, Ireland. Location: A3 (158).
- Royal Botanic Gardens, Wakehurst Place, UK. Acc. no. 1987–4028.
- Royal Horticultural Society Gardens Wisley, UK, no details available.
- Sir Harold Hillier Gardens, Romsey, UK. Acc. no. 1981.1753.
- Thenford House Arboretum, Thenford, UK. No details available.
- University Parks, Oxford, UK. Acc. no. 02565, 02566.
- Westonbirt Arboretum , Tetbury, Glos., UK. Planted 1981, acc. no. 1980/159.
- Wijdemeren City Council, Netherlands. Elm collection. Planted at Rading 1, Loosdrecht (2007); Overmeerseweg (2015) and De Vijnen (2017) Nederhorst den Berg.

=== Australasia ===
- Waite Arboretum, University of Adelaide, Australia. Acc. nos. 572, 598

== Nurseries ==
=== Europe ===
- Ashridge Trees, , Castle Cary, Somerset, UK
- Coles Nurseries, Thurnby, Leicester, UK.
- Lorenz von Ehren, Hamburg, Germany.
- Van Den Berk (UK) Ltd., , London, UK
