= Ulmus 'Frontier' =

Elm cultivar

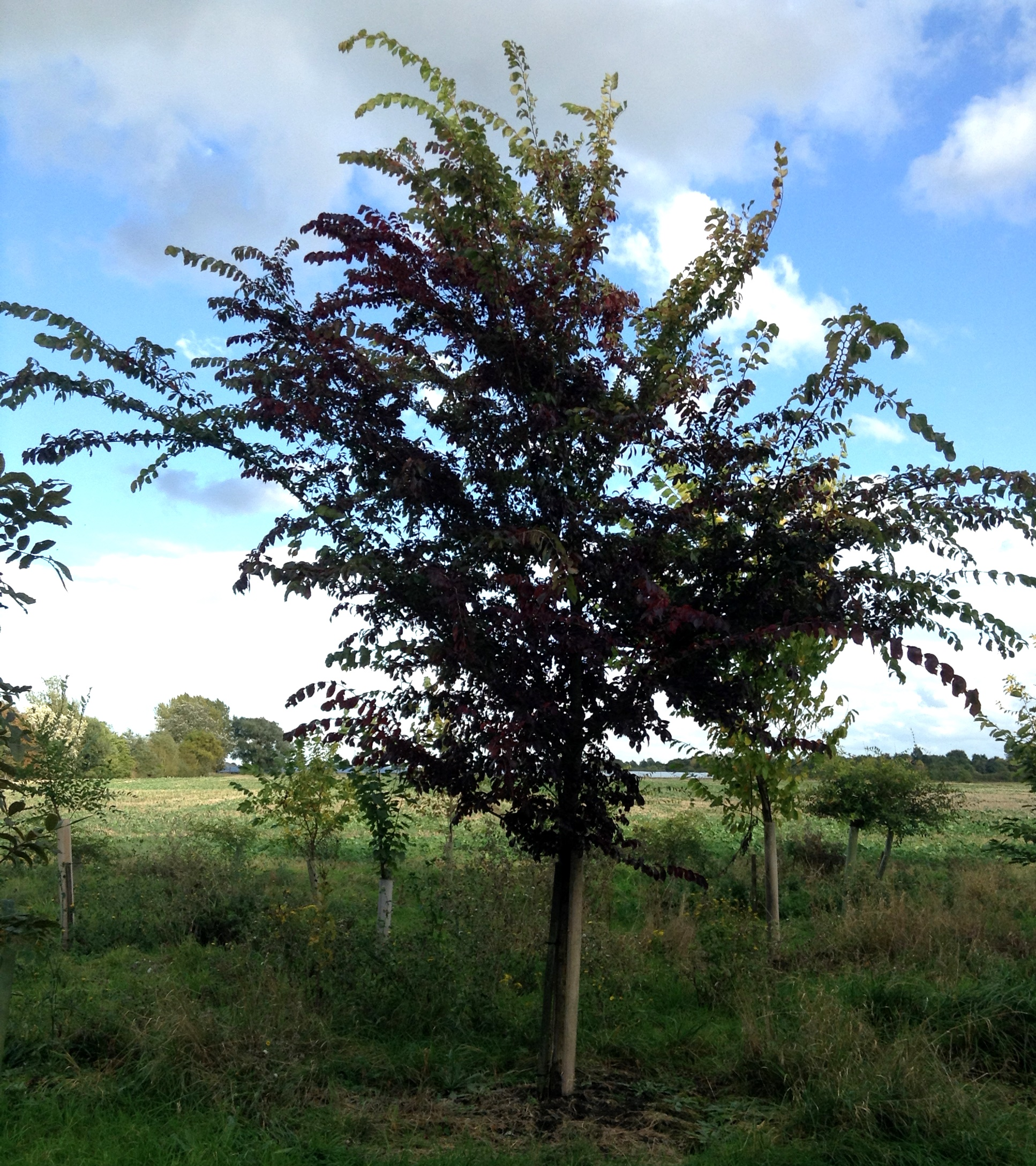
- 'Frontier', Grange Farm Arboretum, UK.
- Genus: Ulmus
- Hybrid parentage: U. minor × U. parvifolia
- Cultivar: 'Frontier'
- Origin: US

Ulmus 'Frontier' is an American hybrid cultivar , a United States National Arboretum introduction (NA 55393) derived from a crossing of the European field elm Ulmus minor (female parent) with the Chinese elm Ulmus parvifolia in 1971. Released in 1990, the tree is a rare example of the hybridization of spring- and autumn-flowering elms. Tested in the US National Elm Trial coordinated by Colorado State University, 'Frontier' averaged a survival rate of 74% after 10 years.

== Description ==
'Frontier' develops a vase or pyramidal shape, with glossy green foliage turning, unusually for elms, to burgundy in autumn. The twigs are pubescent. Slow growing, the ultimate height of the tree has yet to be determined, but should be > 15 m. The tree is autumn-flowering but rarely does so, and has not produced seed.

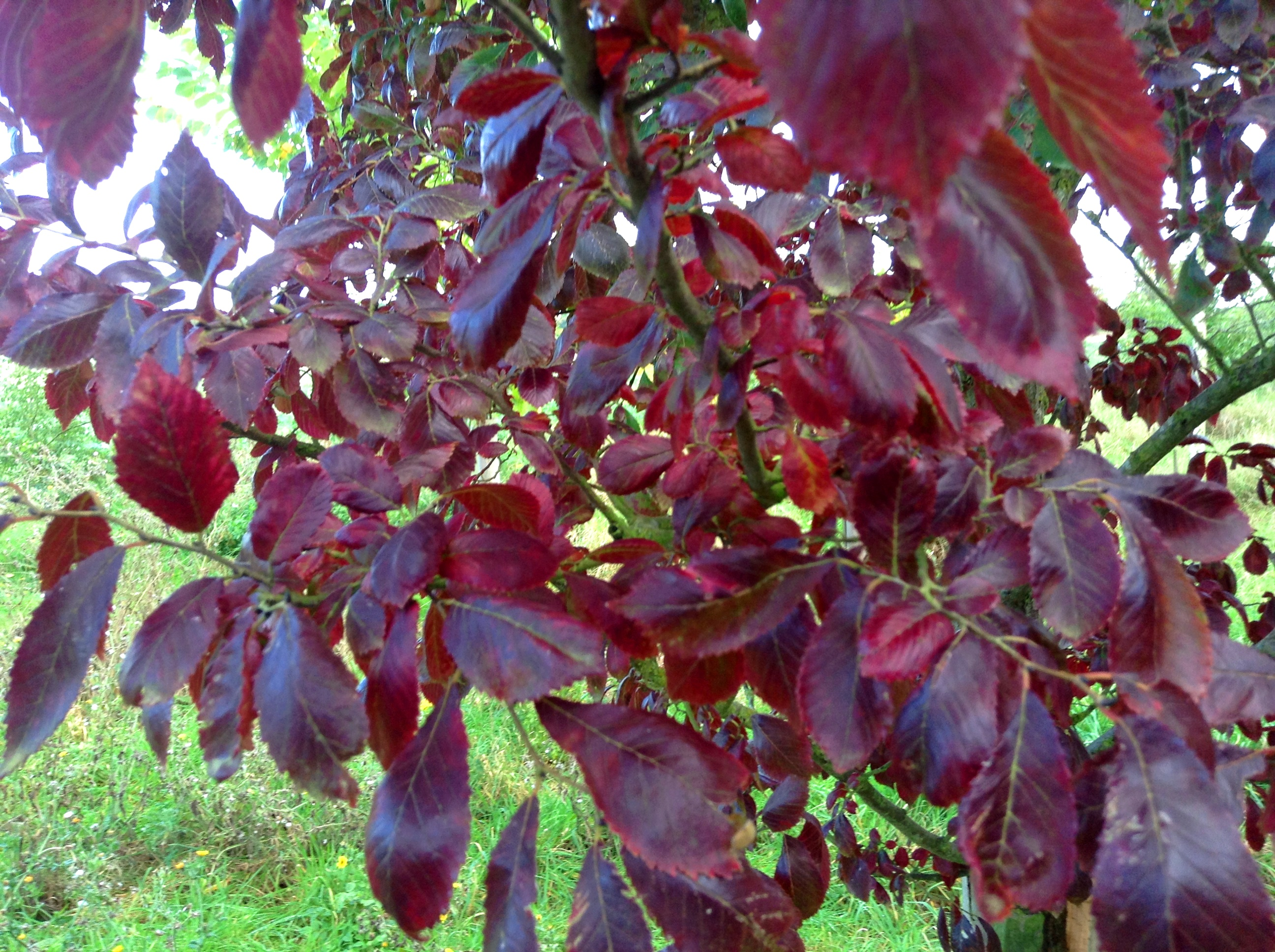
Fall foliage

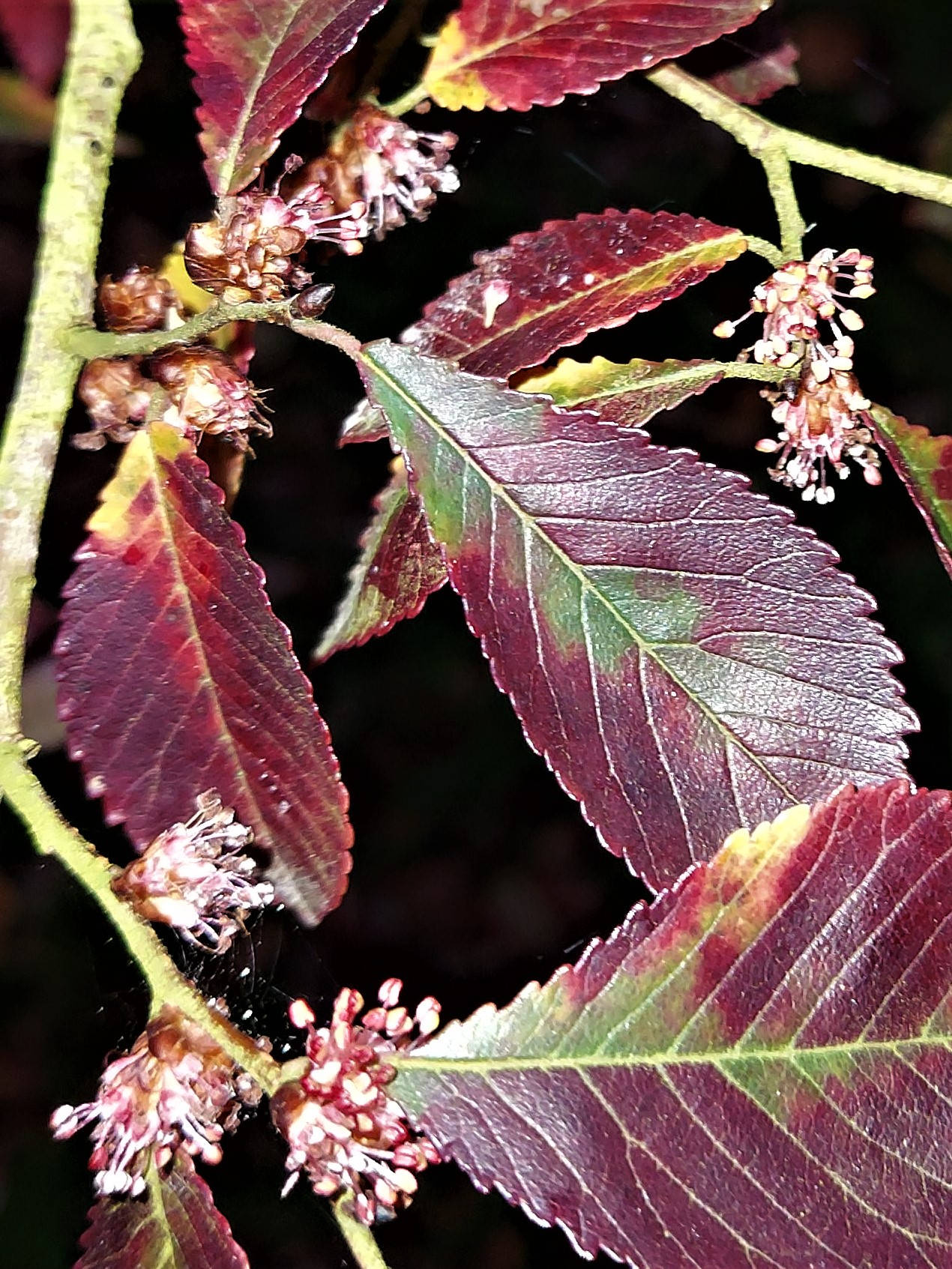
Flowers and foliage

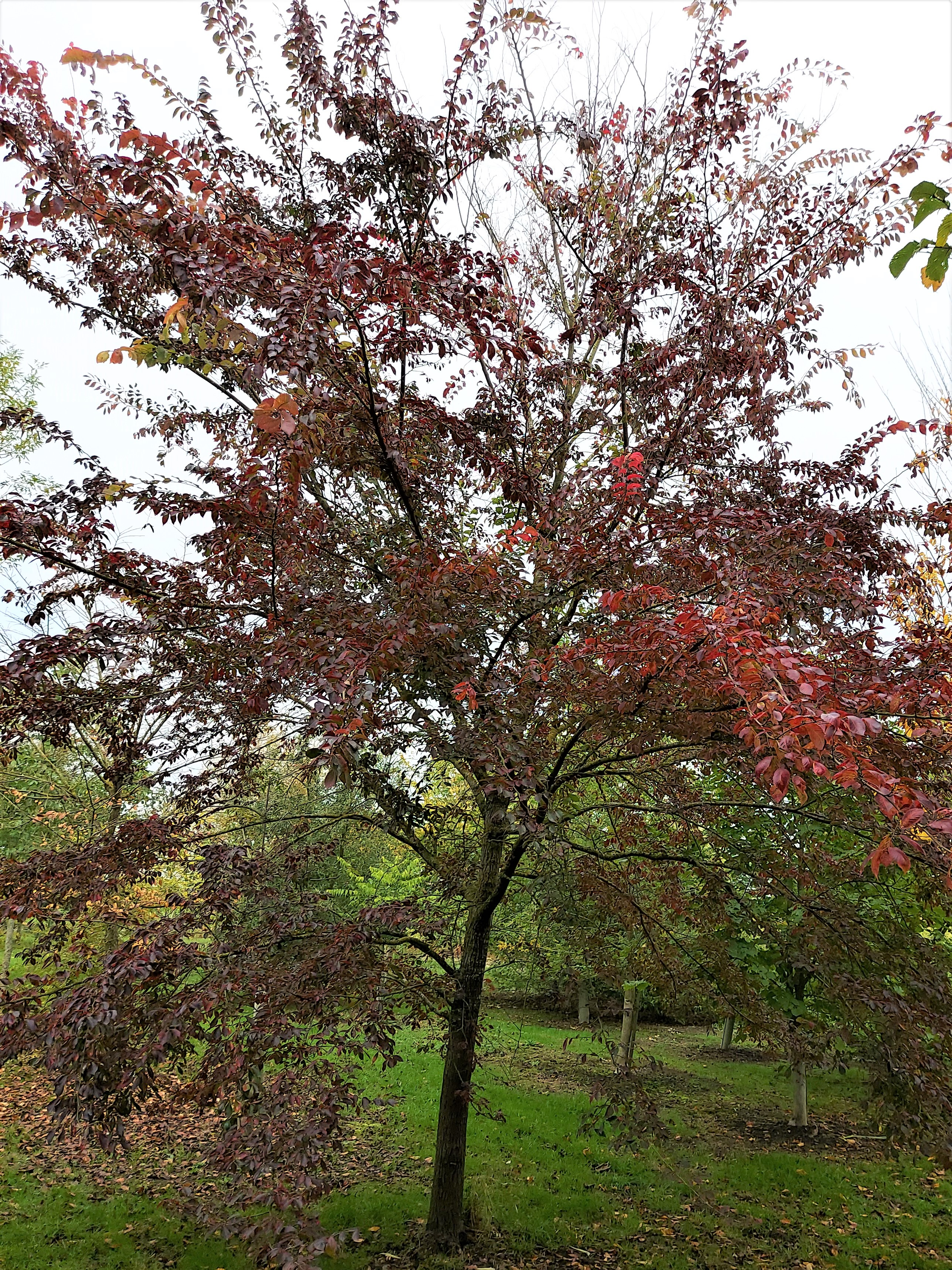
Fall color

== Pests and diseases ==
'Frontier' has a good resistance to Dutch elm disease, rated 4 out of 5, but tolerance of elm yellows from grafts in the United States was found to be poor. However, no mortalities are known to have occurred from the latter disease in the field, the cultivar not known to be vulnerable to infection through natural means. The tree can be heavily to severely damaged by the elm leaf beetle Xanthogaleruca luteola, although it fared better than most of the cultivars assessed at U C Davis, suffering little more than 10% foliar damage. Although susceptible to attack by Japanese beetle, it is far less seriously affected than most hybrid cultivars available in the United States.

== Cultivation ==
In trials in eastern Arizona , 'Frontier' and another American hybrid, 'Regal', were found to have the highest tolerance of the hot and arid climate, notably exhibiting minimal leaf scorch. However, 'Frontier' is known to have sustained winter damage where planted in the Great Plains . This failing was repeated in the elm trials conducted by the University of Minnesota, although the tree often recovered the following year. It was also criticized for its form and integrity, considered "unsuitable" for urban forestry. 'Frontier' fared better in 10-year trials at Atherton, California, to evaluate replacements for Californian elms lost to disease: "Strong structure, rapid growth rate, attractive leaf color in spring and fall, and relatively low pruning requirement suggest that Frontier has promise...", although the tree again proved only moderately tolerant of elm leaf beetles.

'Frontier' has had a limited introduction to Europe, where it is largely restricted to arboreta and elm collections. In the Netherlands, however, dendrologist Martin Tijdgat reported (2020) that 'Frontier' "has become a popular tree, partly thanks to the efforts of Hans Kaljee", tree consultant for the city of Amsterdam. 'Fontier' also featured in trials in New Zealand during the 1990s at the Hortresearch station, Palmerston North.

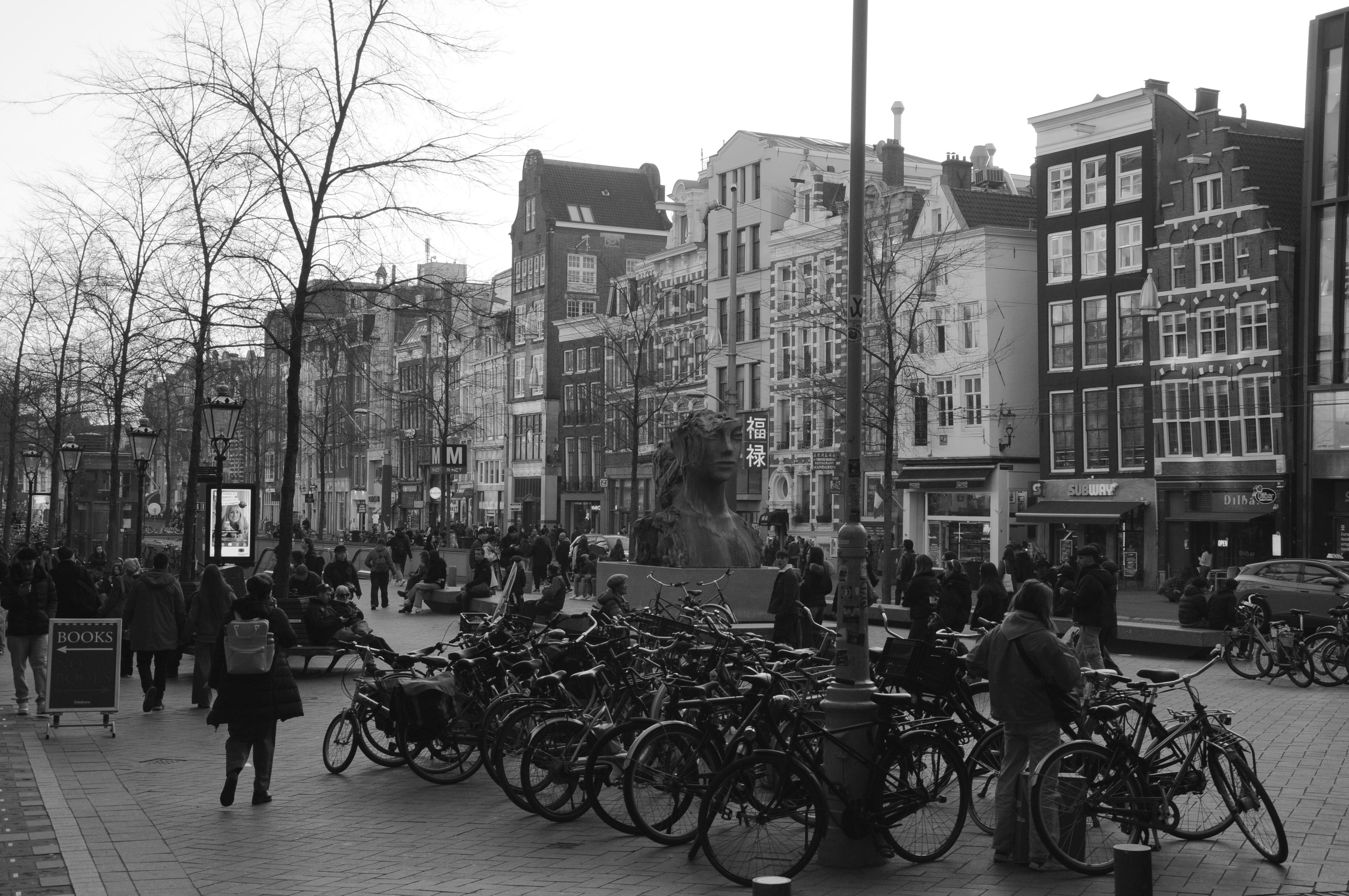
'Frontier' as a street tree, Rokin, Amsterdam (March 2025)

== Accessions ==
North America

- Bartlett Tree Experts, US. Acc. nos. 2001–097/8/9
- Brooklyn Botanic Garden, US. Acc. no. 20040606.
- Chicago Botanic Garden, US. No details available.
- Dawes Arboretum, US. Newark, US. 3 trees. No acc. details available.
- Holden Arboretum, US. Acc. no. 95–140
- Morton Arboretum, US. Acc. nos. 1284–2004, 433–2005, 270–2008
- Parker Arboretum, US. No acc. details.
- Scott Arboretum, US. Acc. no. 91–242
- Smith College, US. Acc. no. 19804, 36005
- University of Idaho Arboretum, US. Acc. no. 1995010
- U S National Arboretum, Washington, D.C., US. Acc. no. 68984

Europe

- Grange Farm Arboretum, Lincolnshire, UK. Acc. no. 504
- Great Fontley Butterfly Conservation Elm Trials plantation, UK. One small sapling planted 2021

== Nurseries ==
North America

- Backyard Trees, Park Hill, Oklahoma, US.
- Carlton Plants, LLC, Dayton, Oregon, US.
- Charles J. Fiore , Prairie View, Illinois, US.
- ForestFarm , Williams, Oregon, US.
- Herd Farm Nursery, Belvedere, Tennessee, US.
- J. Frank Schmidt & Son Co., Boring, Oregon, US.
- Johnson's Nursery , Menomonee Falls, Wisconsin, US.
- Jost Greenhouses, Missouri, US.
- North American Plants , Lafayette, Oregon, US.
- Pea Ridge Forest , Hermann, Missouri, US.
- Sester Farms, Gresham, Oregon, US.
- Sun Valley Garden Centre, Eden Prairie, Minnesota, US.

Europe

- Golden Hill Plants , Marden, UK.
- Pan-Global Plants , Frampton-on-Severn, Gloucestershire, UK.
- Van Den Berk (UK) Ltd., , London, UK
