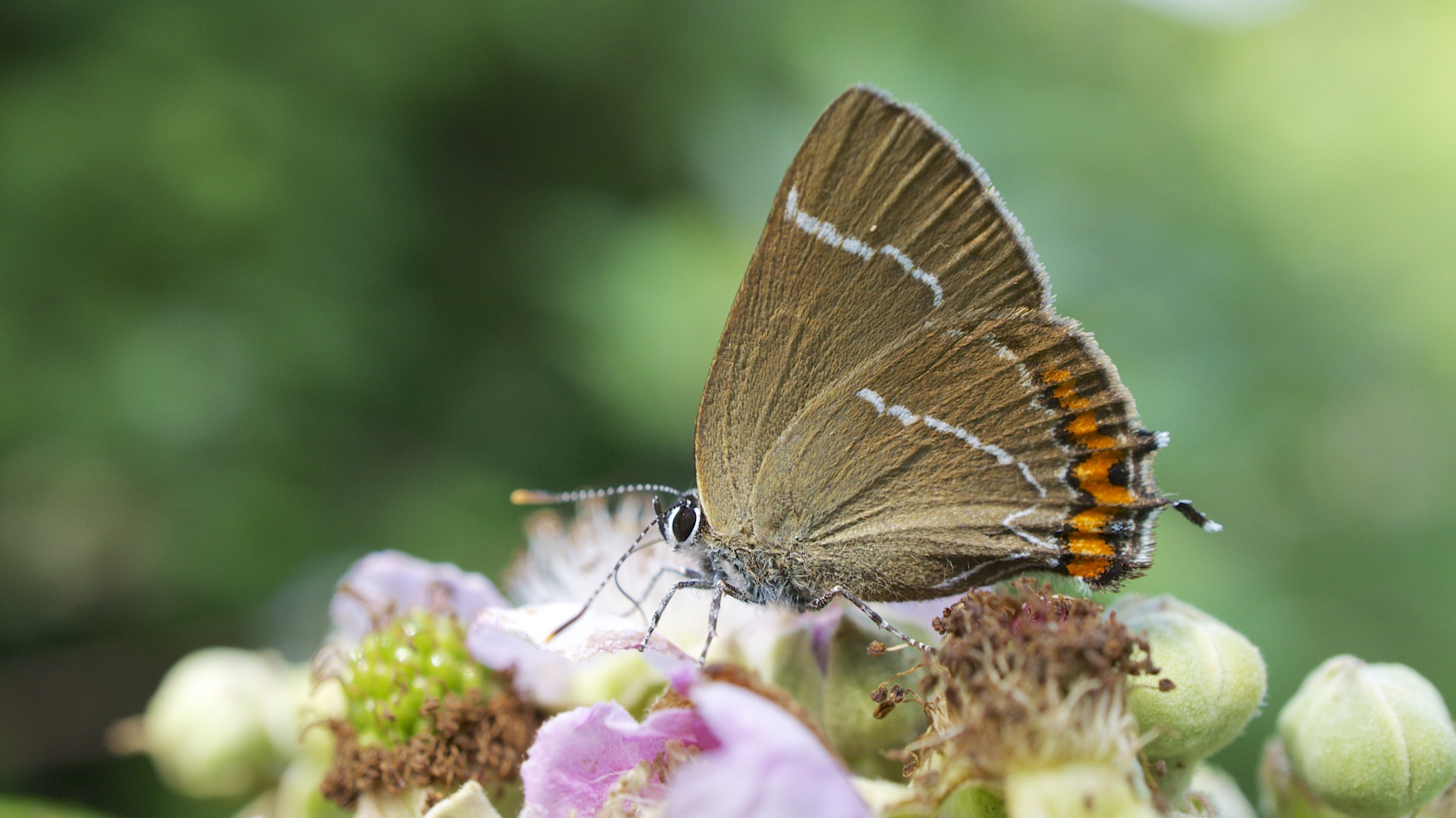

Scientific classification
- Kingdom: Animalia
- Phylum: Arthropoda
- Clade: Pancrustacea
- Class: Insecta
- Order: Lepidoptera
- Family: Lycaenidae
- Genus: Satyrium
- Species: S. w-album

Binomial name
- Satyrium w-album (Knoch, 1782)

= White-letter hairstreak =

Species of butterfly

The white-letter hairstreak (Satyrium w-album) is a butterfly in the family Lycaenidae.

== Appearance and behaviour ==
A dark little butterfly that spends the majority of its life in the tree tops, feeding on honeydew, making it best observed through binoculars. The uppersides are a dark brown with a small orange spot in the bottom corner of the hindwing. The male has a small pale spot on the forewings made up of scent scales. The undersides are a lighter brown with a thin white line, the "hairstreak", which gives this group of butterflies their name. On the hindwing this streak zigzags to form a letter W (or M) from which this species gets its name. The outer edge of the hindwing has an orange border, but there is no orange on the forewings as on the similar black hairstreak and there are two short tails, the female's longer than the male's on the hindwings. Part of a group known as "lateral baskers", they always rest with their wings closed, usually at right-angles to the sun during day.

== Description in Seitz ==
T. w-album Knoch (72 h). Above similar to unicolorous specimens of spini; the white band of the hindwing beneath commences more proximally. about the middle of the costal margin, and runs straight to the base of the tail, forming here a W. Before the margin of the hindwing a bright red undulate band. Central, Northern and Eastern Europe and Anterior Asia. In ab. butlerovi Krul. the white band of the hindwing beneath is posteriorly obsolete, there being no white W. On the other hand, ab. albovirgata Tutt has the white band much wider, reaching on the hindwing to the red submarginal band; there occur also transitions towards this aberration (semialbovirgata), with the band widened in parts. — sutschani Tutt [now subspecies] resembles the nymotypical form, but the underside is paler grey and is variegated with small white spots at the red band; from Sutchan. — fentoni Btlr. [now subspecies] is coloured above like European specimens, but agrees with spini in size, and the submarginal spots of the hindwing beneath are orange instead of red; North Island of Japan (Hokkaido). — Egg semiglobular, red-brown, with white reticulation; as a rule deposited in pairs on elm. Larva until June, adult light green, with thin small oblique subdorsal stripes and brownish head:it generally takes such a position on the underside of a leaf that it resembles a small fresh leaf or a fold between the ribs. Pupating on the trunk or close to the ground; often the sexes meet already as larvae and pupate near one another, the male behind the female (Voelschow). Pupa yellowish brown, with darker wing cases. The butterflies occur in July and August and are rather local. On certain days I have seen towards 11 o'clock some numbers come down from the tree-tops to the road where they settled in the dust, not on damp places. As they could not find a firm hold, they frequently tumbled over and remained lying sideways in the sun. Otherwise singly near woods and in avenues of elm-trees.

== Distribution ==
The insect has a widely disjunct distribution across the Northern Hemisphere; it is found throughout much of Europe, from Wales to the Urals, southern Scandinavia to the Mediterranean, and again in Siberia, the Russian Far East, Korea, and Japan. It has not been reported from the Himalaya, despite the occurrence of four species of elm there. The species is also absent from North America.

== United Kingdom ==
It is widely but patchily distributed across most of England; the butterfly is absent from Ireland, western Wales and most of Cornwall. In 2017, the butterfly was spotted in Scotland again after a gap of 133 years. The spread of second, far more lethal, strain of Dutch elm disease in the 1970s inevitably had a major impact on the British population, but it has since recovered well in places and is still increasing its range.

To safeguard the future of this butterfly, some conservation organisations within the UK, such as the Hampshire and Isle of Wight branch of Butterfly Conservation and the Forestry Commission, have planted disease-resistant cultivars, notably Lutece. The beetle-resistant European white elm has also been widely planted, notably by the Cheshire Wildlife Trust.

== Life cycle and food plants ==
Eggs are laid singly, usually on the girdle scars near the terminal buds of elm trees. Unlike other hairstreak eggs, white-letter hairstreak eggs are harder to find during the winter months as they are flatter, turn brown with age, and are thus far less distinct on the twigs. Wych elm is reputedly preferred, but field elm and European white elm are also used, as are Asiatic species, notably Japanese and Siberian elm, as well as hybrid cultivars such as Lutèce. The caterpillar hatches in March. Under normal circumstances, where sexually-mature trees occur, it immediately feeds on the flowers, later the seeds, before progressing to the emergent leaves in April. However, research in the Low Countries has shown that the larvae are remarkably adept at using non-flowering suckers; provided they are able to hydrate on emergence, they can survive dormant for up to six weeks, until the leaves flush. The larval stage lasts on average for 57 days, but this can vary from 37 to 78 days, depending on food availability.

Pupation takes place underneath a leaf or twig, or in a bark crevice. Adults are on the wing from late June until the middle of August in the UK, where there is one brood a year. The butterflies occasionally fly down from the canopies to nectar from flowers when honeydew is unavailable, notably after heavy rains have washed it from the leaves. The much-preferred flower observed in the UK is creeping thistle, but bramble and others are also used. In France, the butterfly has been observed nectaring on Buddleja davidii, but the flowers of the broad-leaved lime tree appear to be its favourite, owing to its copious nectar production, in contrast to the small-leaved lime.

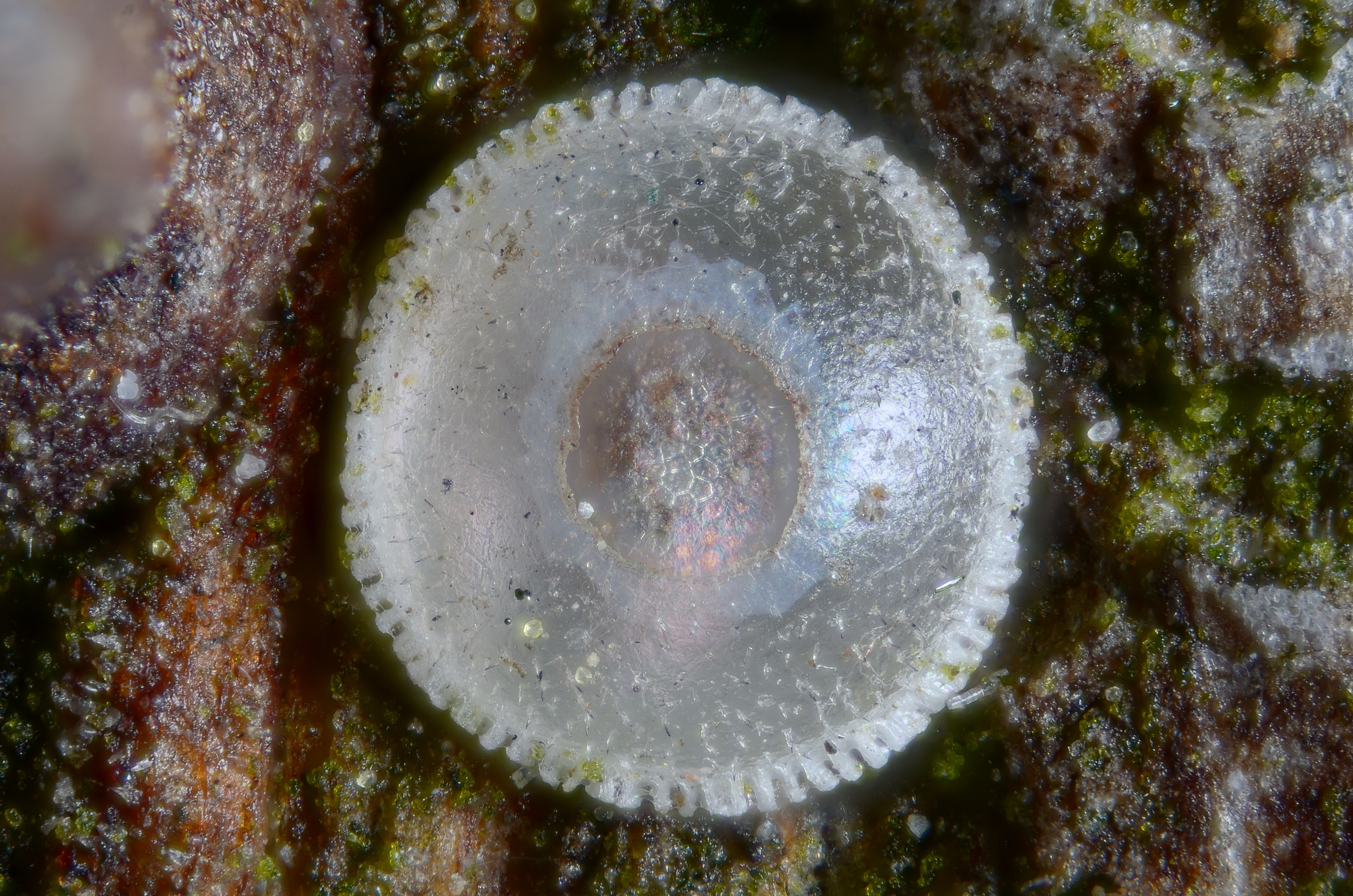
Newly-laid egg

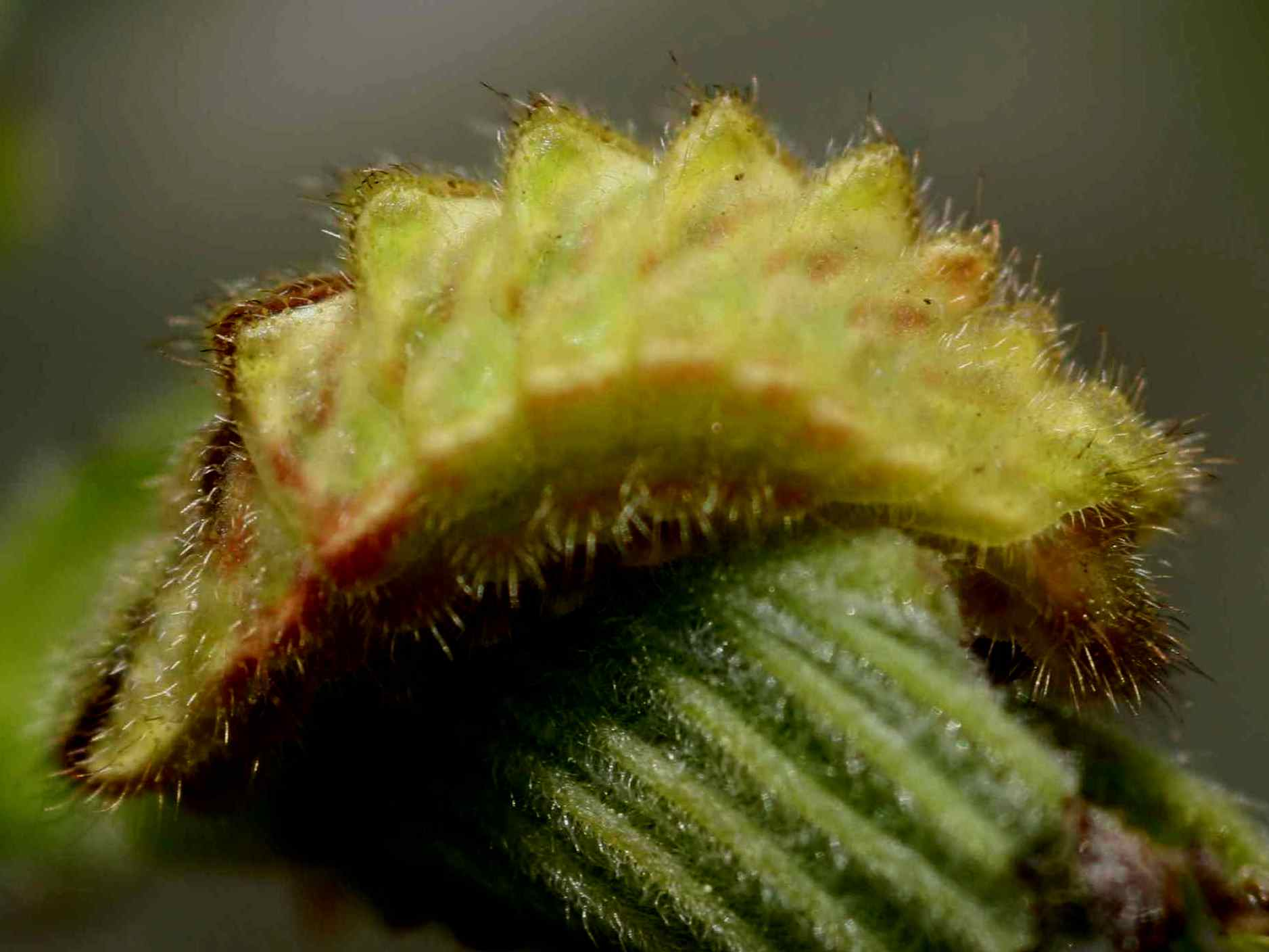
Mature caterpillar

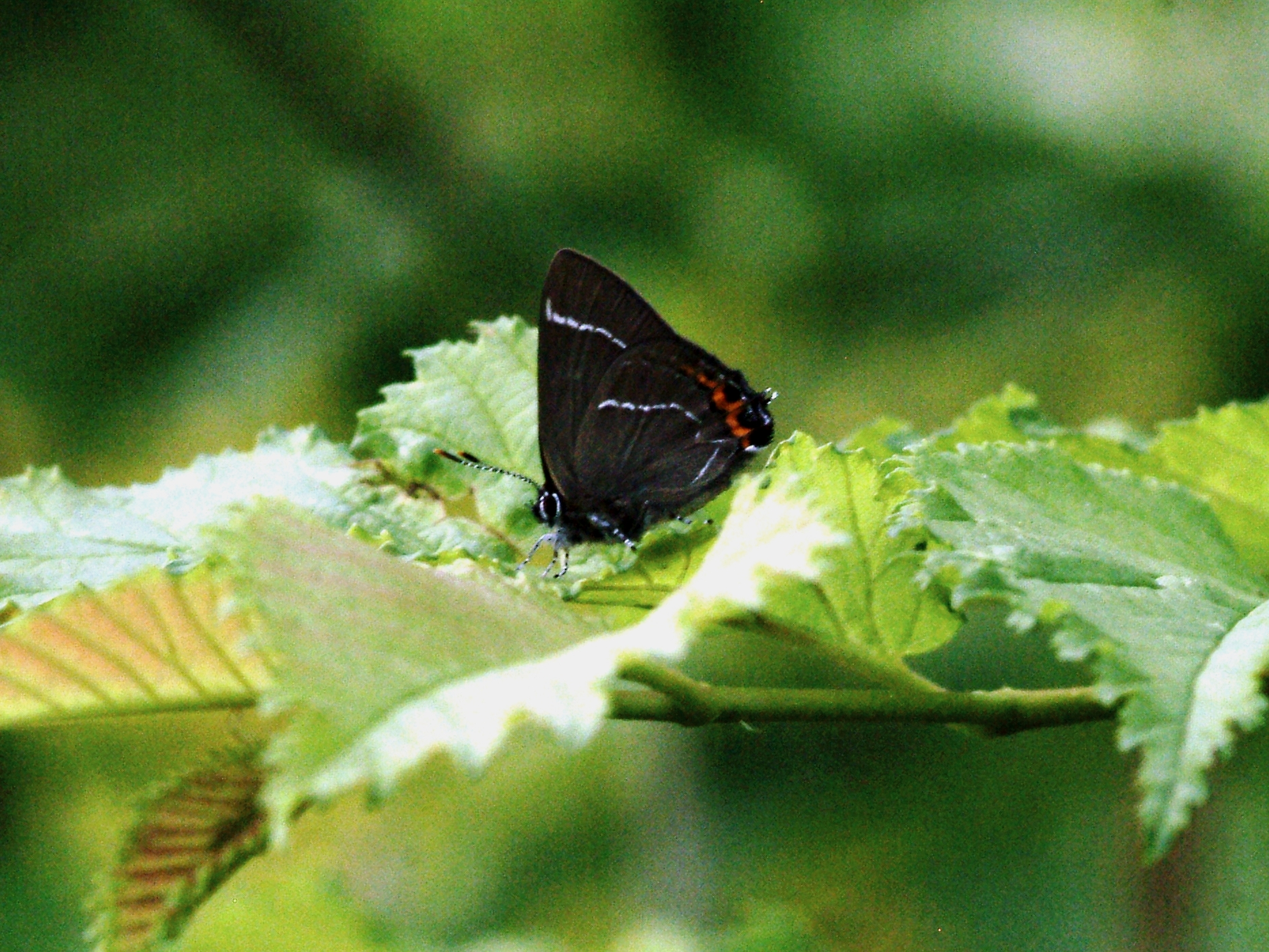
White-letter hairstreak on Lutece elm

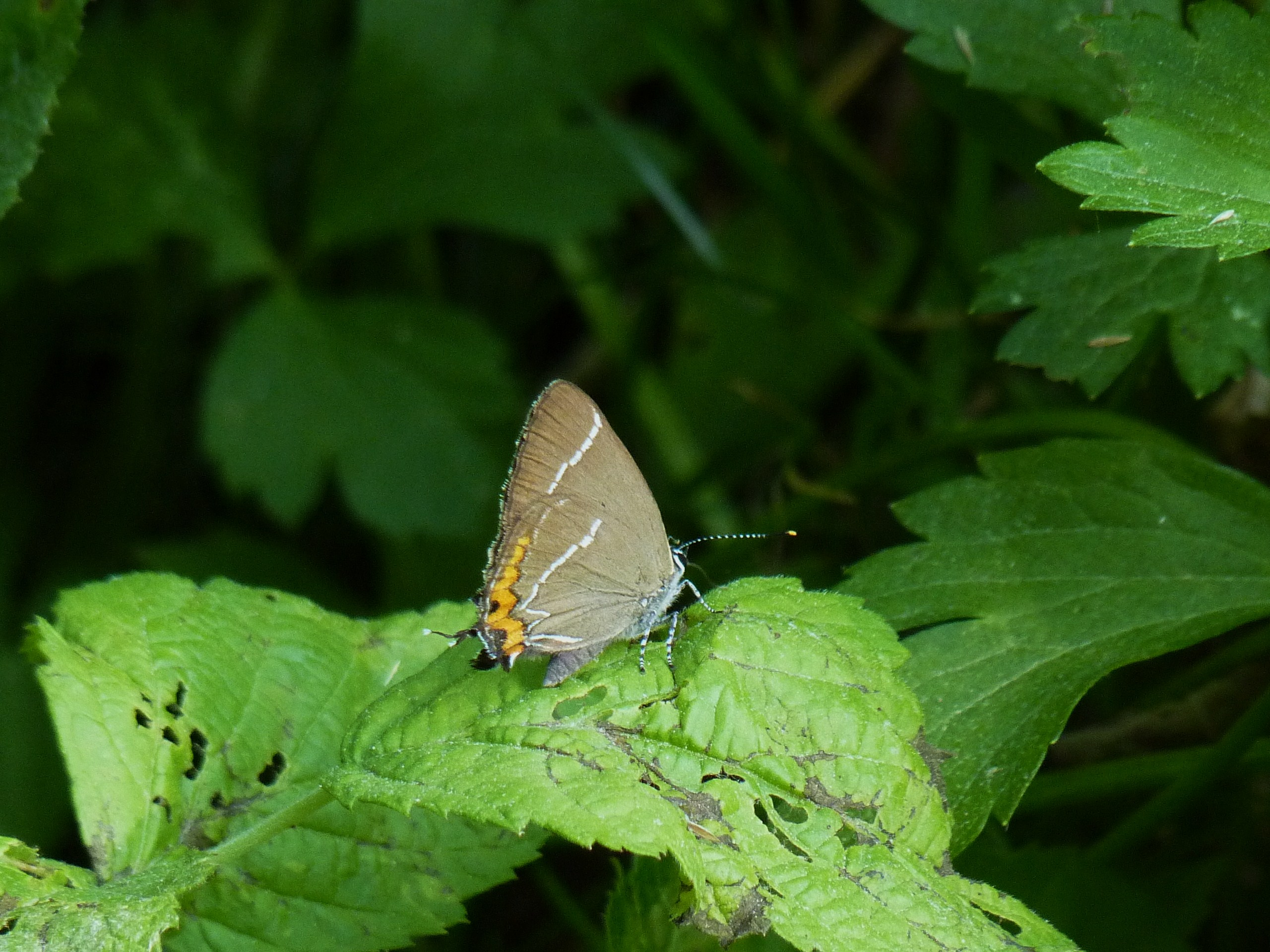
White-letter hairstreak

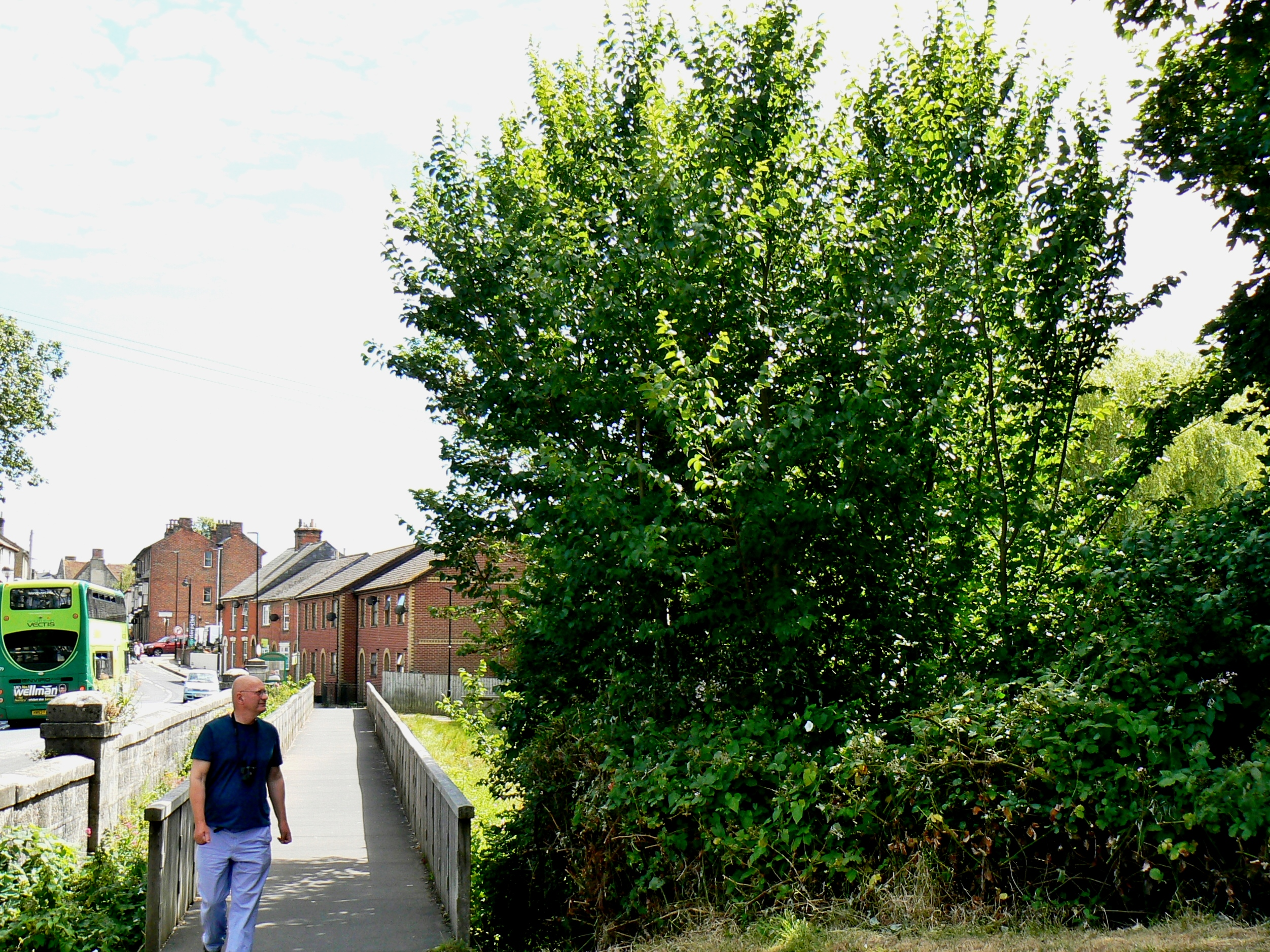
Elm cultivar Lutece, Isle of Wight, hosting white-letter hairstreak 2015

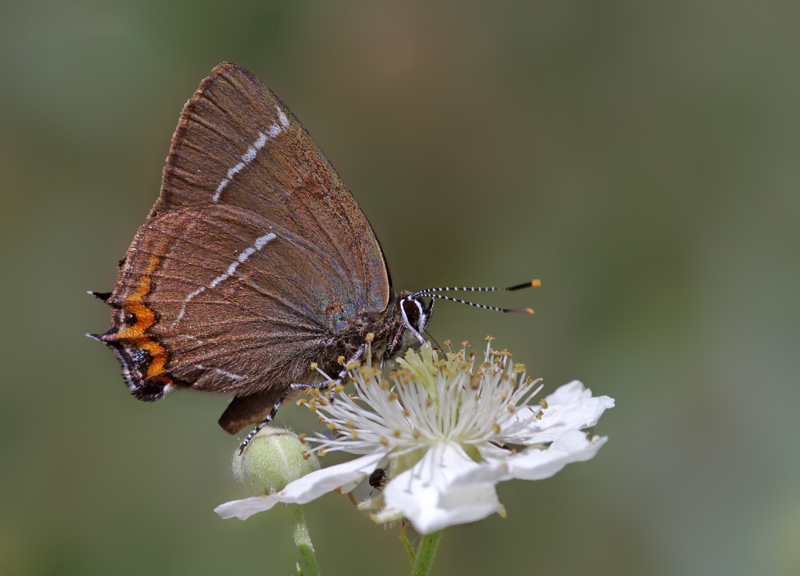
White-letter hairstreak nectaring on bramble flower; Saimbeyli, Turkey

== See also ==
- List of butterflies of Great Britain

== General references ==
- Davies, Martyn and Ceney, Bryan (1992). The White-letter Hairstreak Butterfly. Butterfly Conservation, Colchester, UK, pp. 27. ISBN 0-9512452-7-9
- The Vale Royal White-letter Hairstreak Project, Cheshire Wildlife Trust, UK.
