= Baldauf =

Baldauf is a Germanic surname. It may refer to:

- Albert Baldauf (1917–1991), German politician
- Christian Baldauf (born 1967), German politician
- Dario Baldauf (born 1985), Austrian footballer
- Dominik Baldauf (born 1992), Austrian cross country skier
- Elisabeth Baldauf (born 1990), Austrian Olympic badminton player
- Felix Baldauf (born 1994), Norwegian Greco-Roman wrestler
- Hannes Baldauf (1938–2015), German footballer
- Joachim Baldauf (born 1965), German photographer
- Lillian Pringle Baldauf (1880–1964), American cellist
- Robert Baldauf (1881–1918), Swiss philologist and academic
- Rüdiger Baldauf (born 1961), German jazz trumpeter, composer, and arranger
- Sari Baldauf (born 1955), Finnish businessperson

== See also ==
- Frühauf
- Spaeth
