= Spaeth =

Spaeth, Spæth, or Späth is a surname, and may refer to:

== Spaeth ==
- Barbette Spaeth (born 19??), American professor and Roman mythology expert
- Diana Palmer (author) (born Susan Spaeth, 1946), American romance novelist
- George Spaeth (born 1932), American ophthalmologist specializing in glaucoma
- Harriet Reynolds Krauth Spaeth (1845–1925), American organist, hymnwriter, translator
- Johann Peter Spaeth (c.17th century–1701), Austrian theologian; Judaism convert from Christianity
- John Duncan Spaeth (1868−1954), American philologist and professor
- Matt Spaeth (born 1983), American football player
- Merrie Spaeth (born 1948), American actress and public relations/communications consultant
- Nicholas Spaeth (1950–2014), American jurist and politician
- Ove von Spaeth (born 1938), Danish writer, graphic designer, and independent scholar
- Paul Spaeth (born 19??), American musician and composer
- Sigmund Spaeth (1885–1965), American musicologist, composer, and radio personality
- Tony Spaeth (1934–2021), American corporate identity planner, consultant, critic, and teacher

== Späth ==
- Britta Späth, German mathematician
- David Späth (born 2002), German handballer
- Ernst Späth (1886–1946), Austrian chemist
- Franz Jakob Späth (1714–1786), German keyboard instrument builder
- Franz Ludwig Späth (1838–1913), German botanist and nurseryman; father of Hellmut
- Georg Späth (born 1981), German ski jumper
- Gerold Späth (born 1939), Swiss poet and writer
- Hellmut Ludwig Späth (1885–1945), German botanist and nurseryman; son of Franz Ludwig
- Joseph Späth (1823–1896), Austrian obstetrician and professor
- Louis Späth (fl.1892), German botanist
- Lothar Späth (1937–2016), German politician
- Ludwig Späth (1793–1883), German botanist and nurseryman; father of Franz Ludwig
- Manuel Späth (born 1985), German handballer
- Melanie Späth (born 1981), Irish racing cyclist
- Trudy Späth-Schweizer (1908–1990), Swiss politician

== See also ==
- Spaeth Design (founded 1947), American marketing firm
- Spæth House (built 1765–1770), Helsingør, Denmark
- Späth-Arboretum (founded in 1879), Berlin, Germany
- Späth nursery (founded 1790), Berlin, Germany
