= Ulmus × hollandica 'Fastigiata' =

Elm cultivar

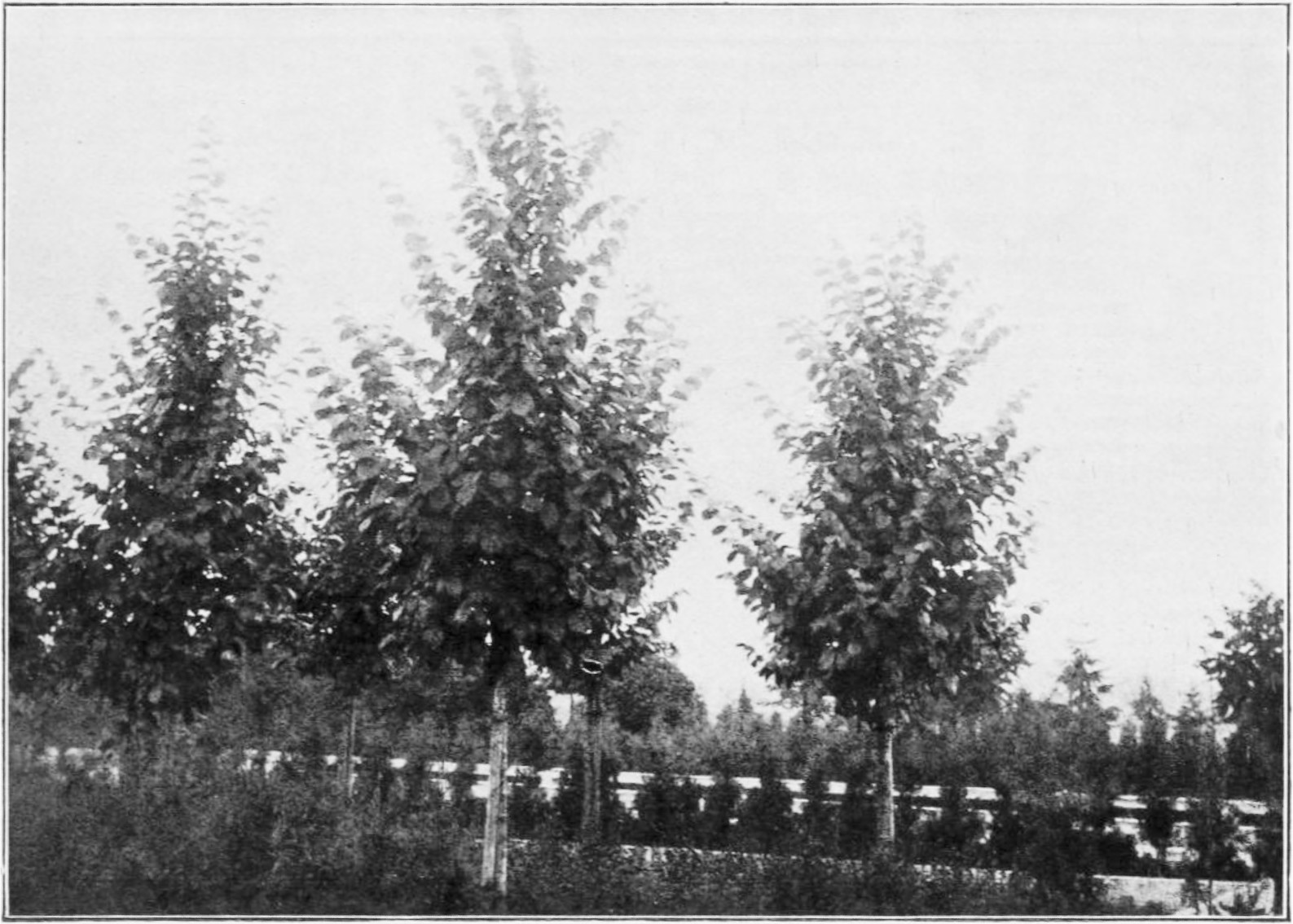
- Ulmus glabra fastigiata, Zirlau, Silesia (1915)
- Hybrid parentage: U. glabra × U. minor
- Cultivar: 'Fastigiata'
- Origin: Germany

The hybrid elm cultivar Ulmus × hollandica 'Fastigiata' was first listed and described as Ulmus glabra fastigiata, a narrow-crowned elm with large smooth leaves, by Petzold and Kirchner in Arboretum Muscaviense (1864). C. Berndt of the Berndt Nursery, Zirlau, Schweidnitz, described an elm of the same name in Mitteilungen der Deutschen Dendrologischen Gesellschaft (1915, including a photograph), that he had received in 1903 "from a renowned nursery in Holstein" as Ulmus montana fastigiata macrophylla. A tree of that name had been listed by Dieck in 1885 without description. Berndt reported that his U. glabra fastigiata was "easy to confuse with U. montana superba", a tree "known in the Magdeburg region as Ulmus praestans", a statement confirming that, like that cultivar, his tree was a form of U. × hollandica. Karl Gustav Hartwig who received specimens of U. praestans from Kiessling of the Magdeburg city nursery in 1908, concluded (1912) that U. glabra fastigiata Kirchner was indistinguishable in leaf or habit from U. praestans. An U. campestris glabra fastigiata Arb. Musc. [ = Kirchner] was distributed by the Hesse Nursery, Weener, Germany, in the 1930s, where it was listed separately from U. praestans.

The Späth nursery of Berlin marketed an U. montana fastigiata glabra in the 1890s and early 1900s. Bean (1925) listed an U. glabra 'Fastigiata Stricta' (1925).

Not to be confused with Exeter Elm, Loudon's U. montana fastigiata (1838) and Elwes and Henry's U. montana var. fastigiata (1913).

== Description ==
Kirchner's Ulmus glabra fastigiata was narrow-crowned, with large smoothish leaves of firmer texture than his Ulmus glabra Mill., now Ulmus minor. Berndt's Ulmus glabra fastigiata was a tree of tight narrow pyramidal growth, the leaf being dark, acuminate, irregularly veined, and often wider at the top than lower down. Berndt reported the tree as "less vigorous" than the similarly fastigiate 'Superba', U. praestans. The leaves of the latter are "less broad and slightly lighter in colour, smoother, finer and more evenly veined".

== Cultivation ==
Ulmus glabra fastigiata was cultivated in Silesia by the Berndt Nursery, Zirlau, Schweidnitz, in the early 20th century. Berndt reported that, though stocked in only a few nurseries, it was praised at the 20th Century Exhibition in Breslau. No specimens are known to survive.
