= Ulmus glabra 'Fastigiata Macrophylla' =

Elm cultivar

- Species: Ulmus glabra
- Cultivar: 'Fastigiata Macrophylla'
- Origin: Germany

The putative Wych Elm cultivar Ulmus glabra 'Fastigiata Macrophylla' was first mentioned by Dieck in the Zöschen catalogue in 1885 as Ulmus montana forma fastigiata macrophylla, without description. Hartwig added a description in 1892. Berndt (of the Berndt Nursery, Zirlau, Schweidnitz) received "from a renowned nursery in Holstein" an Ulmus montana fastigiata macrophylla, possibly the same clone, in 1903, which he listed and described as Ulmus glabra fastigiata in Graf von Schwerin's Mitteilungen der Deutschen Dendrologischen Gesellschaft (1915).

Henry noted (1913) that a tree grown at Kew Gardens under a not dissimilar name, U. montana macrophylla fastigiata, was "similar in all respects" to a hybrid cultivar there, acquired from the Späth nursery in 1900, that he called Ulmus superba Henry.

== Description ==
The tree was described as a beautiful pyramidal form with large leaves.

== Cultivation ==
No specimens are known to survive.
