= Ulmus × hollandica 'Blandford' =

Elm cultivar

- Hybrid parentage: U. glabra × U. minor
- Cultivar: 'Blandford'
- Origin: Not known

The elm cultivar Ulmus × hollandica 'Blandford' was listed by the Urban Forestry Administration (UFA) of the District Department of Transportation in Washington, D.C., as one of its 'street trees' in 2008. As the UFA has no further documentation to support it, the entry may be spurious, but it is most likely the tree is the wych elm cultivar Ulmus glabra 'Superba', known in the UK as the 'Blandford Elm' and introduced to the US in the early 20th century, or possibly the hybrid cultivar Ulmus × hollandica 'Superba' present in some American collections, including Garfield Park, Washington, D.C., in the mid-20th century.
