= Ulmus glabra 'Superba' =

Elm cultivar

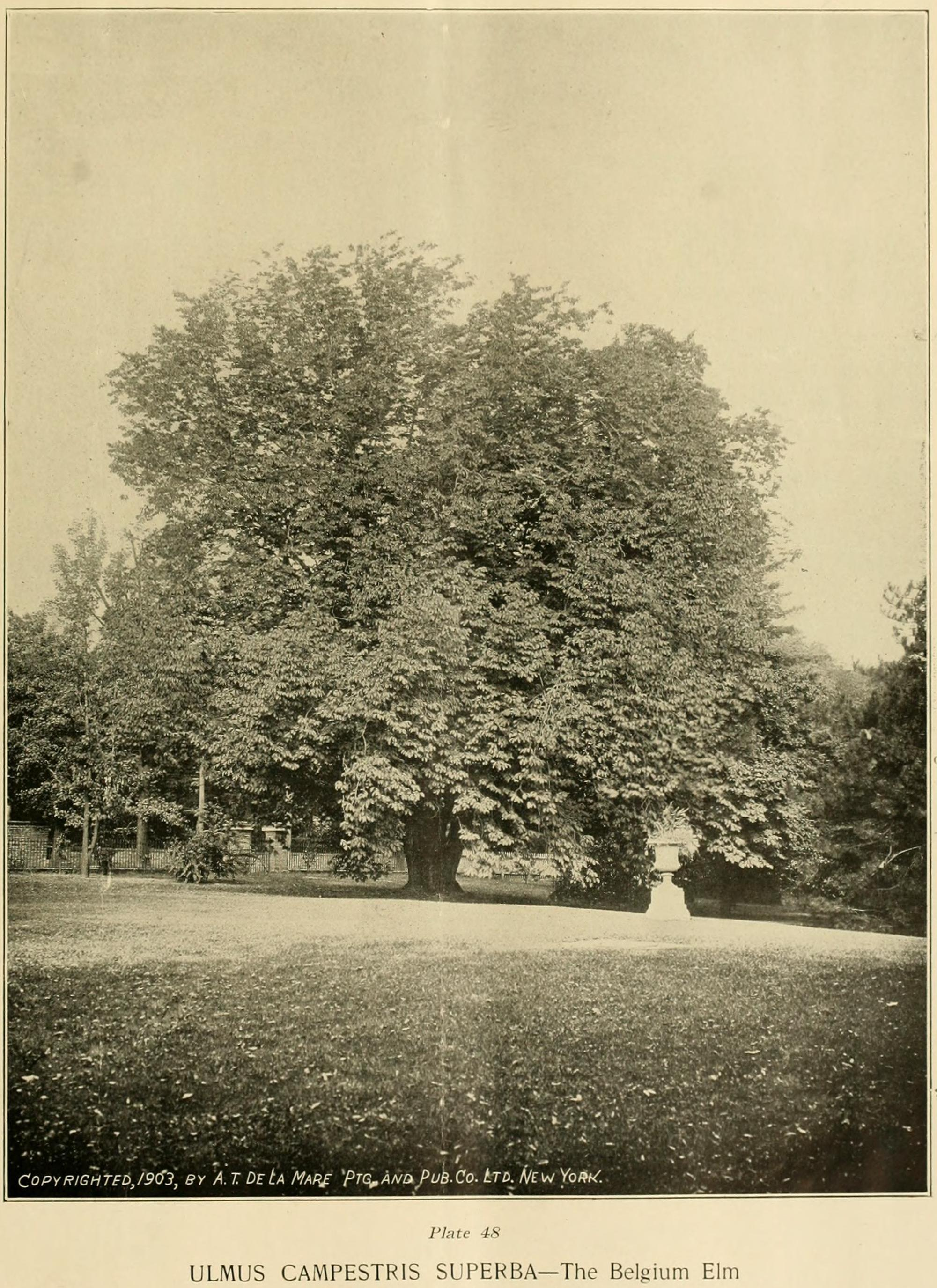
- 'Superba', Mount Hope, Rochester, New York, c.1900
- Species: Ulmus glabra
- Cultivar: 'Superba'
- Origin: England

The wych elm cultivar Ulmus glabra Huds. 'Superba', Blandford Elm, with unusually large leaves, was raised by Gill's of Blandford Forum, Dorset, in the early 1840s as Ulmus montana superba and was quickly distributed to other UK nurseries. It was confirmed as a form of wych, and first described by Lindley in The Gardeners' Chronicle, 1845, later descriptions being added by Gill (1845) and Morren (1848), who called it U. montana var. superba. Morren had adopted the name 'Superba' from the Fulham nurseryman Osborne in 1844, who supplied him with the tree – presumably one of the nurseries supplied by Gill. Morren states that 'Superba', already in cultivation in England, was introduced to Belgium by Denis Henrard of Saint Walburge, Liège, that in 1848 it had been present in Belgium for only three years, and that this variety was the one described as 'Superba' by Osborne, whom Henrard had visited at his nursery in Fulham in September 1844. 'Blandford Elm', with leaves of the same dimensions, was soon for sale in the USA (see 'Cultivation').

The Späth nursery in Berlin supplied a large-leaved U. montana superba from 1885 to the 1930s. H. Jensen (Note: Possibly Holger Jensen, after whom 'Holgeri' was named.) examined the tree at Späth's nursery and confirmed (1912) that it was identical to Morren's Ulmus montana superba. Späth's catalogue of 1911–12, however, had erroneously claimed that a U. praestans E. Schoch was synonymous with Morren's U. montana superba. Hartwig, who received specimens of U. praestans from Kiessling of the Magdeburg city nursery in 1908, said (1912) that "Ulmus montana superba, supposedly the same [as U. praestans], looks quite different when young, being wide with large, broad, dull green leaves, whereas ... U. praestans show an elongated medium-sized shiny green leaf and densely pyramidal crown". He concluded that U. praestans was not Ulmus montana superba. Späth admitted the error in an article in Möller's Deutsche Gärtner-Zeitung (1912), where he stated that U. praestans E. Schoch was an Ulmus × hollandica hybrid, and implied that Morren's tree was a form of U. montana (wych elm). In later catalogues the nursery distinguished between Morren's Ulmus montana superba and the hybrid U. praestans E. Schoch (for which he adopted Henry's synonym Ulmus superba Henry), marketing both cultivars in the post-war period.

Späth was not the only botanist to confuse wych and hybrid 'Superba'. Though Loudon in his description (1838) of Canterbury Elm, Ulmus montana glabra major, had made no reference to large leaves, Boulger tentatively (1881) and Green more confidently (1964) equated Canterbury Elm with Morren's U. montana var. superba, a synonym not included in Rehder's lists (1915 & 1949). Loudon's description of Canterbury Elm, a fast-growing hybrid like Huntingdon Elm, holding its leaves late, does, however, match descriptions of U. × hollandica 'Superba' [U. praestans].

== Description ==
Descriptions of 'Superba' cultivars vary, as do herbarium specimens, confirming that more than one clone has been given the name. Gill's Ulmus montana superba had very large leaves, 10 in (25 cm) long by 6 in (15 cm) wide. Osborne and Morren's Ulmus montana var. superba likewise had very large wych-like leaves, to 26 by 15 cm, with a tapering tip to 3–4 cm long. The matching names, measurements and dates confirm that Gill's, and Osborne and Morren's, trees were the same clone. An 1880 herbarium specimen showing a large-leaved wych cultivar at Kew Gardens, labelled U. montana superba, has dimensions similar to those given by Gill and Morren (juvenile elm leaves may be larger than those of mature canopy-leaves). (Note: "Herbarium specimen - E00824742". Herbarium Catalogue. Royal Botanic Garden Edinburgh. Sheet described as U. montana var. superba (Kew Gardens specimen, 1880)) The Ulmus 'Superba', 'Blandford Elm', in the 1902 catalogue of the Bobbink and Atkins nursery, Rutherford, New Jersey, was described as "a noble tree of large size and quick growth", with "large dark green foliage and smooth, grayish bark" (presumably in young specimens).

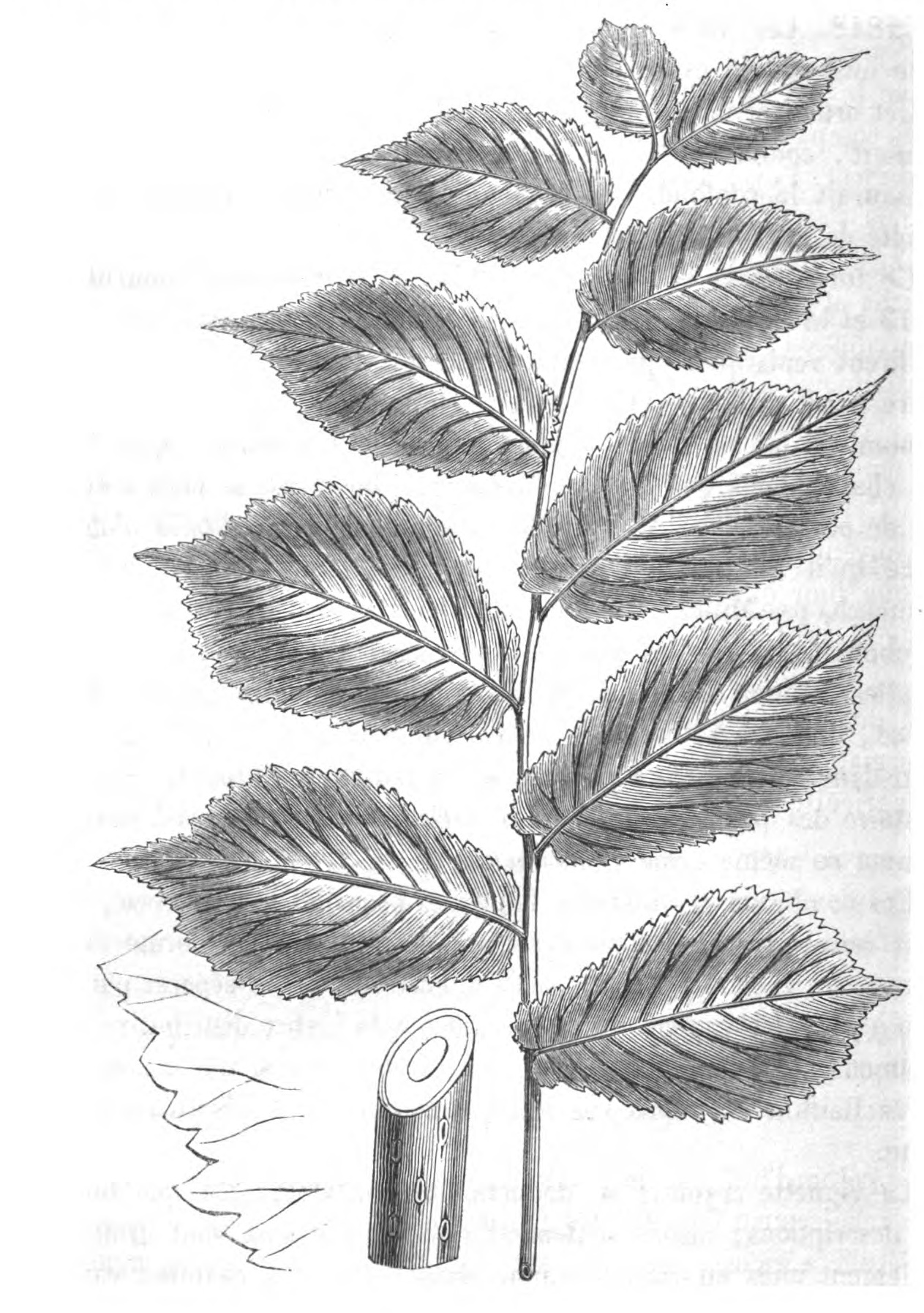
Leaf-drawing (1848) of Osborne and Morren's 'Superba', leaves to 26 × 15 cm.

== Etymology ==
Morren states that 'Superba' was so called "parce qu'en effet cette variété l'emporte sur les autres par sa beauté" [:because indeed this variety surpasses others in beauty].

== Pests and diseases ==
With the exception of Exeter Elm and dwarf wych, U. glabra Huds. cultivars are not noted for any resistance to Dutch elm disease.

== Cultivation ==
An 1880 Kew Gardens herbarium specimen, from one of the arboretum's own trees, labelled U. montana var. Superba and matching Lindley's description, confirms that Gill's tree was present at Kew (see 'External links'). Mid 20th-century herbarium specimens from the Wageningen Aboretum, The Netherlands, show a wych cultivar there "formerly labelled Ulmus × hollandica 'Superba'". (Note: "Herbarium specimen - WAG.1846734". Botany catalogues. Naturalis Biodiversity Center. Sheet labelled Ulmus glabra Huds., formerly called 'Superba') (Note: "Herbarium specimen - WAG.1846731". Botany catalogues. Naturalis Biodiversity Center. Sheet labelled Ulmus glabra Huds., formerly called 'Superba') (Note: "Herbarium specimen - WAG.1846732". Botany catalogues. Naturalis Biodiversity Center. Sheet labelled Ulmus glabra Huds., formerly called 'Superba' (with samarae))

Ulmus montana superba, 'The superb-leaved elm', appeared in the catalogues of Hovey's nursery of Boston, Massachusetts, from the 1850s. 'Blan[d]ford Elm (superba)', with "remarkably large leaves", appeared in the 1868 catalogue of the Mount Hope Nursery (also known as Ellwanger and Barry) of Rochester, New York; by the 1880 catalogue it was listed as U. montana var. superba (Blandford Elm), "A noble tree of large size and quick growth; foliage large and dark green; bark smooth and grayish". Under the same name and description it appeared in the catalogues of the Bobbink and Atkins nursery, Rutherford, New Jersey, and in Kelsey's 1904 catalogue, New York. The absence of Späth's names from the Bobbink and Atkins and the Kelsey lists and their use of 'Blandford Elm' suggest that the cultivar was Gill's clone.

A cultivar listed in 2008 as Ulmus × hollandica 'Blandford' by the Urban Forestry Administration of the District Department of Transportation in Washington, D.C., as one of its 'street trees', is likely to have been Blandford Elm misnamed as a hybrid, or hybrid 'Superba' misnamed 'Blandford'.

Given Späth's pre-1912 naming error, it is not clear whether one planting of U. montana superba at the Dominion Arboretum, Ottawa, Canada, in 1896, sourced from Späth, was the wych or the hybrid 'Superba'. The specimen (no. 42304) maintained as part of a low hedge at Wakehurst Place, Sussex (2020), grown from a cutting from Ottawa donated in 1949, is, however, listed as the hybrid 'Superba', suggesting that 1896 Ottawa planting may likewise have been the hybrid.

== Notable trees ==
A large-leaved elm described as Ulmus campestris 'Superba' obtained from Louis van Houtte of Ghent, Belgium, before 1841 was photographed at the Ellwanger and Barry nursery at Mount Hope, Rochester, New York, c. 1900. The photograph is also captioned 'Belgium Elm', possibly a reference to its source rather than a confusion with the hybrid 'Belgica'. As the nursery later stocked the wych 'Superba', Blandford Elm, it is probable that propagation was from this tree. Arnold Arboretum identified it in 1915 as a varietal form of Ulmus glabra Huds., which would match Blandford Elm, despite the apparent discrepancy in dates.

== Putative specimens in the UK ==
An old example of what appears to be the same clone as the 1880 Kew large-leaved 'Superba' survives (2019) on Leith Links, Edinburgh. The Edinburgh tree has wych samarae and short petioles, with no evidence of hybridization.

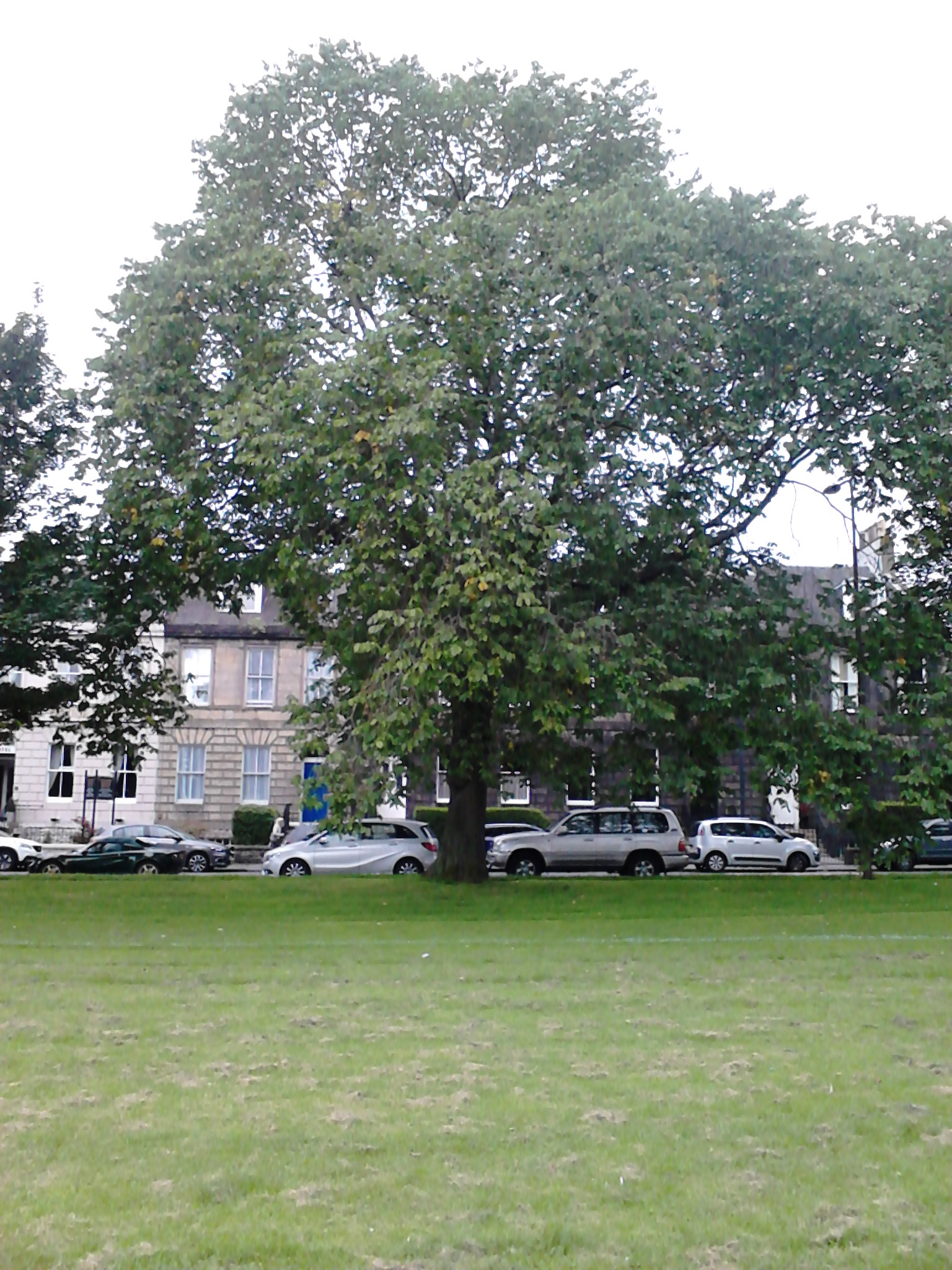
Large-leafed wych cultivar, Leith Links, Edinburgh.

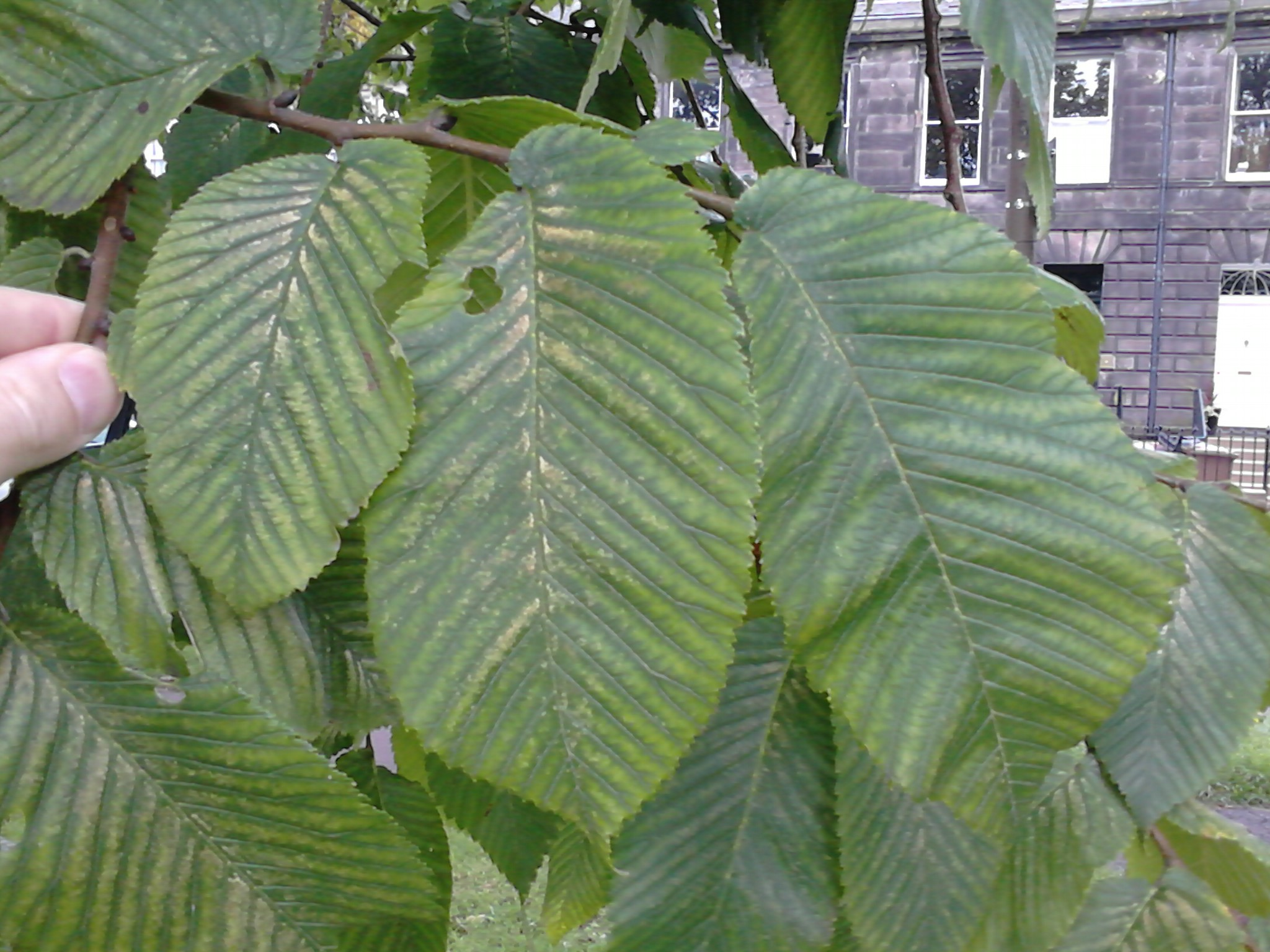
Foliage of same matching Kew's 1880 'Superba'

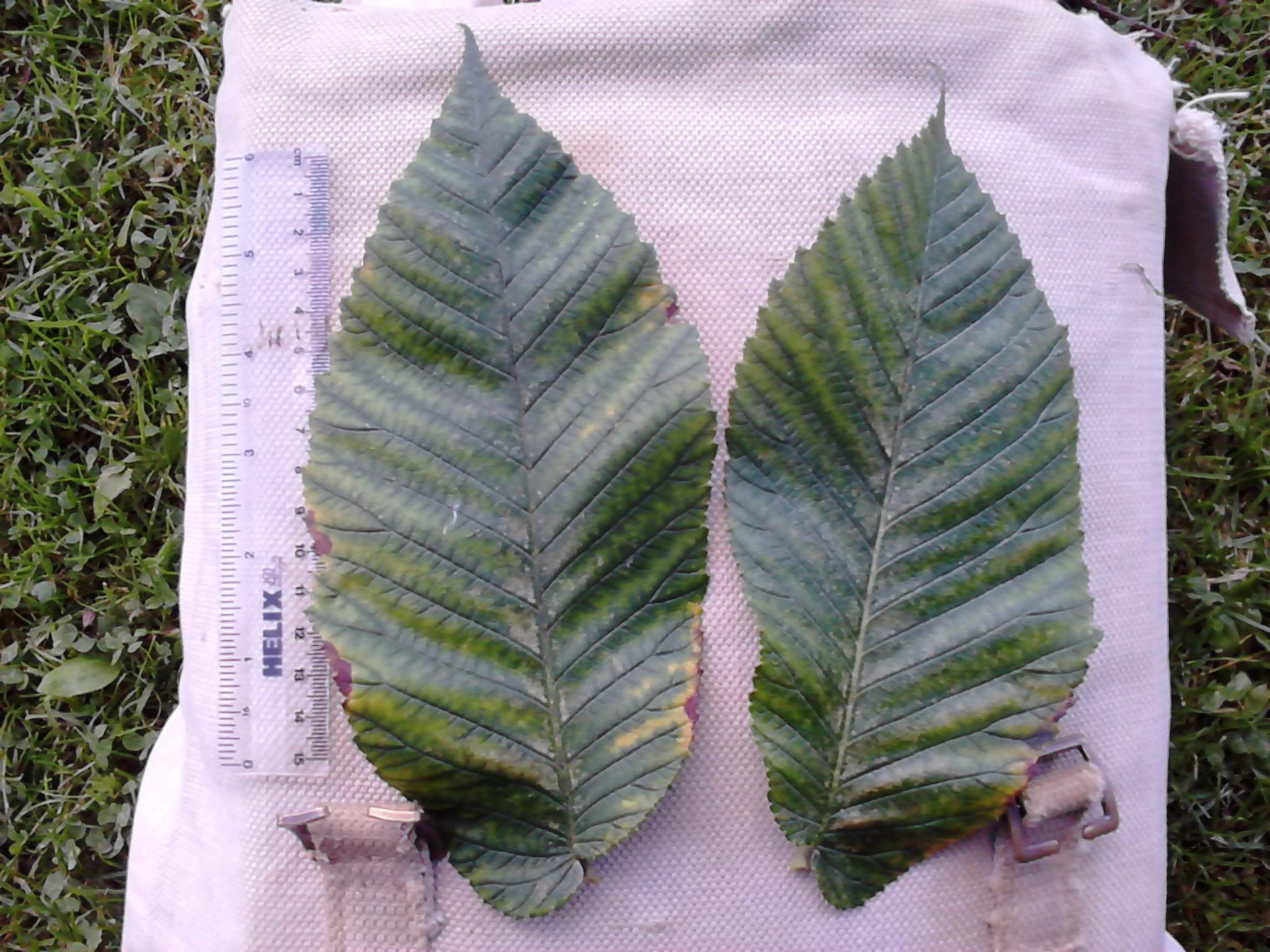
Close-up of leaves

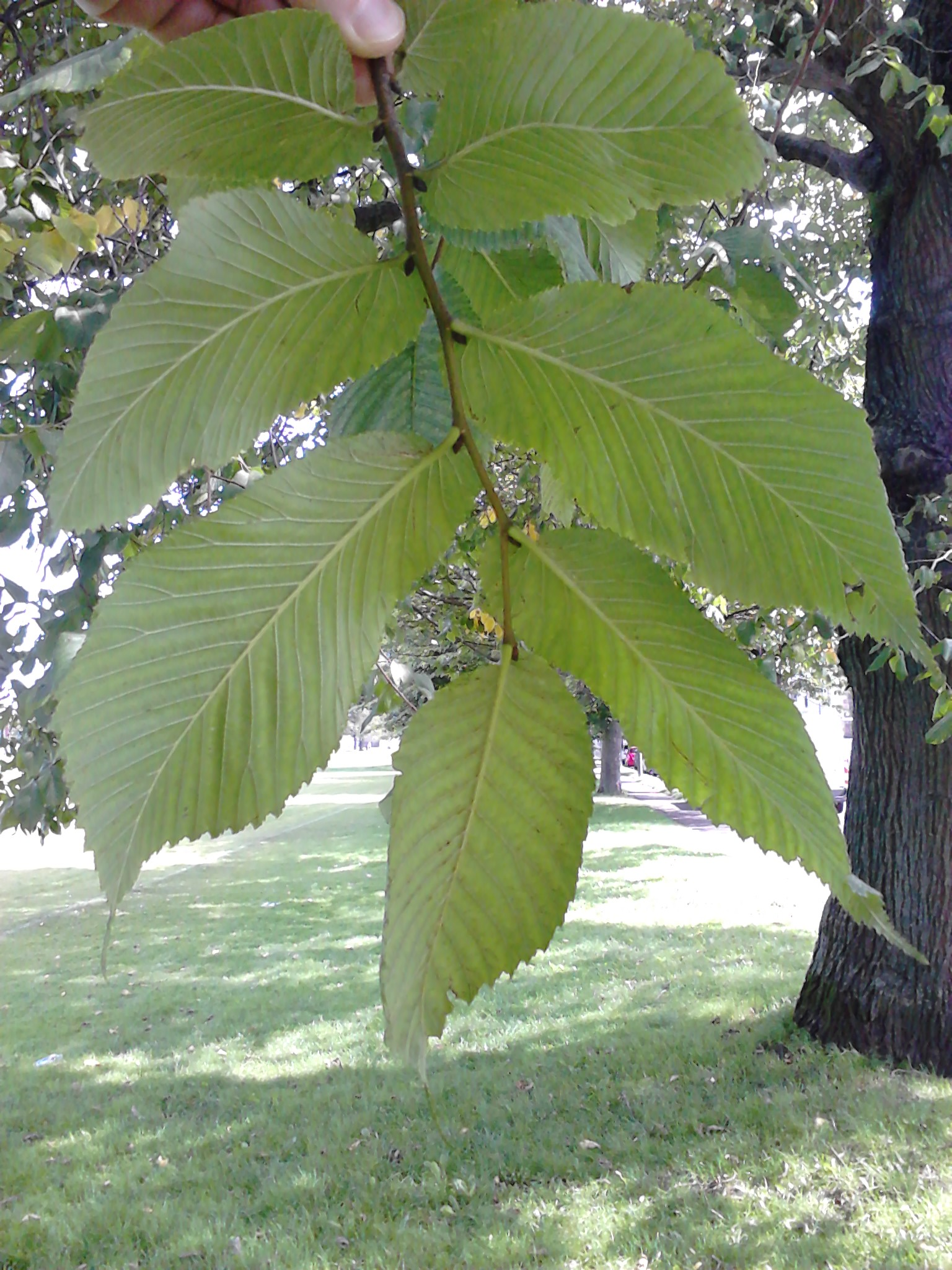
Underside of long shoot

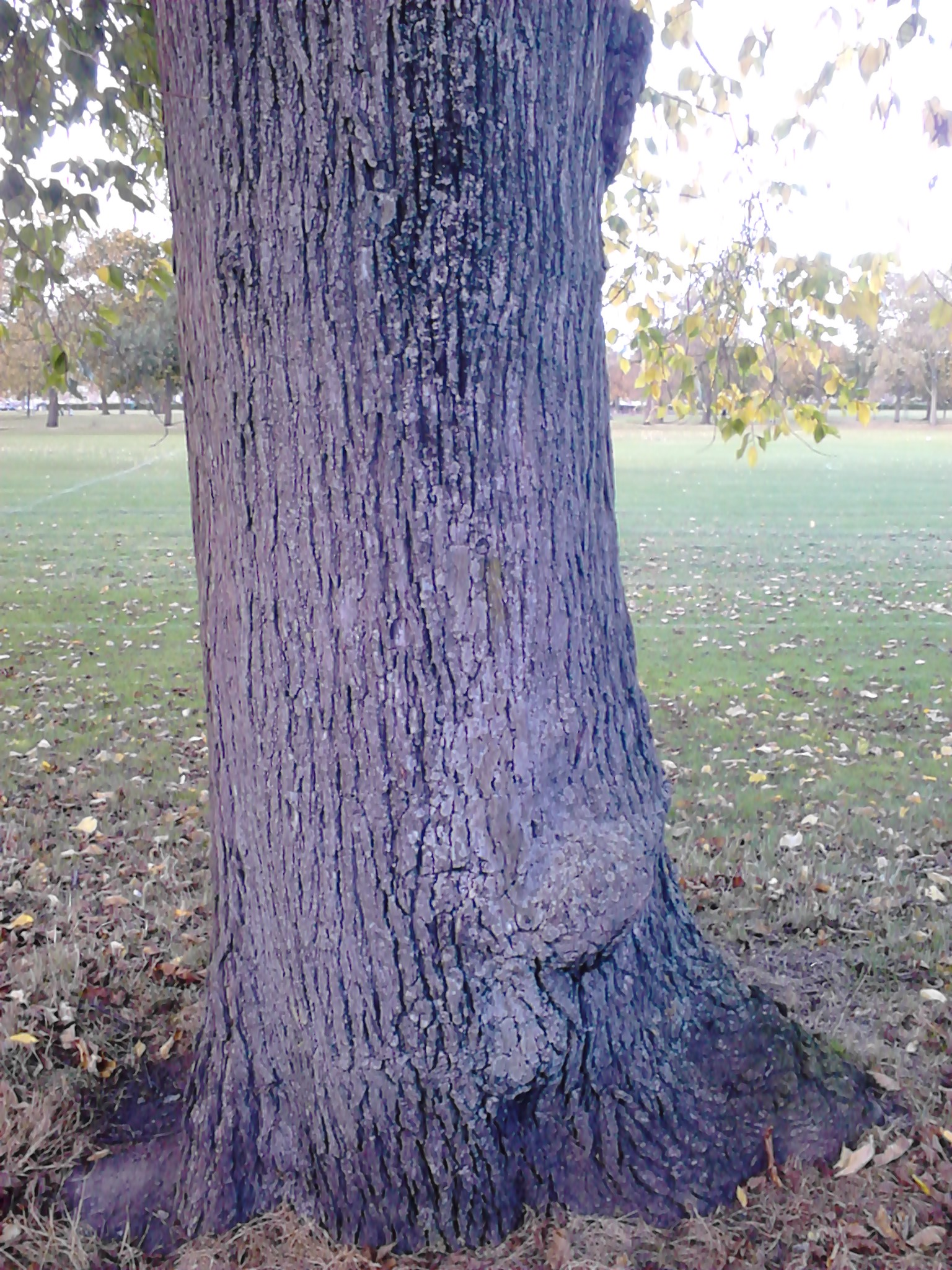
Bole

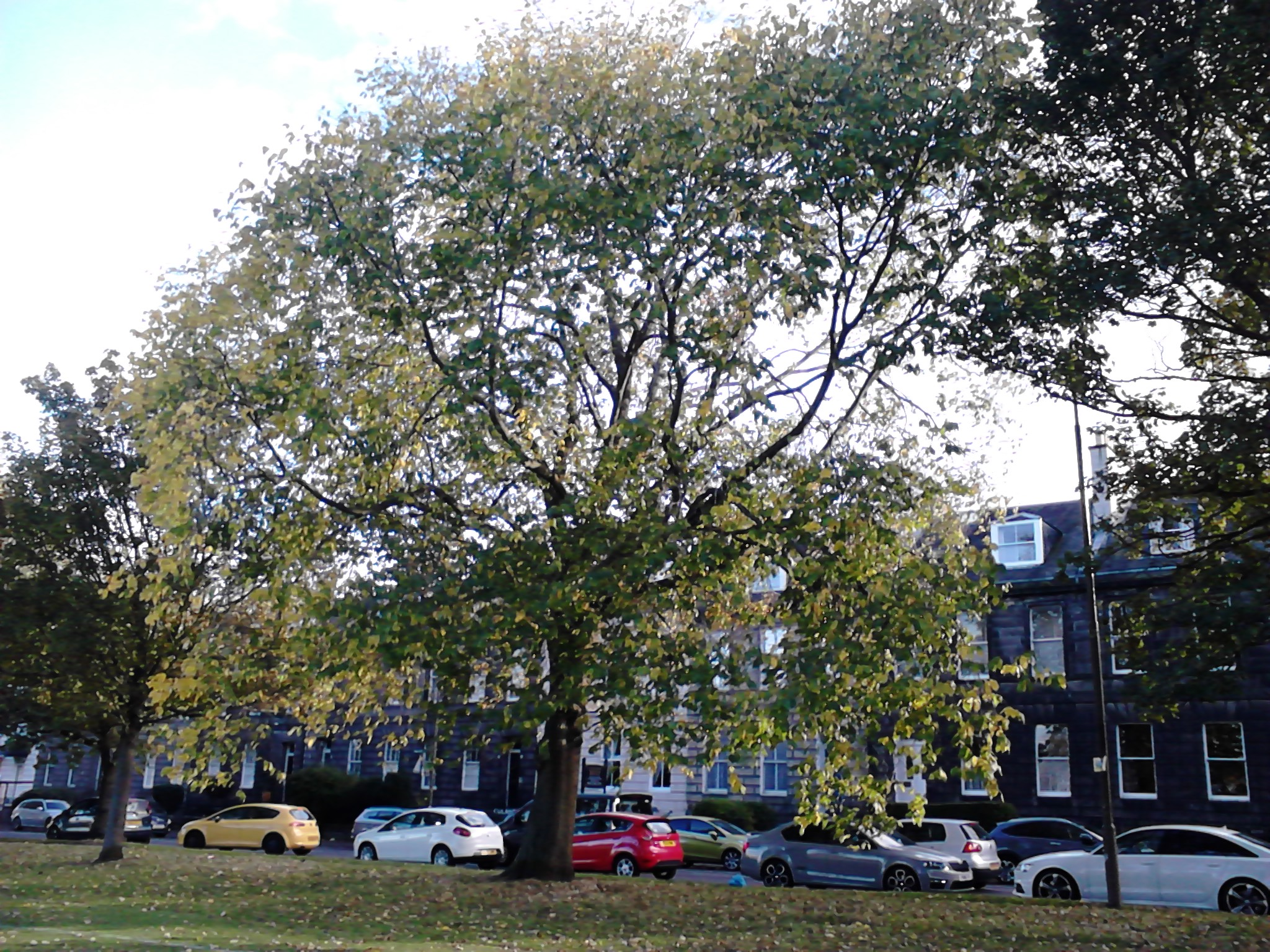
Same, autumn
