= Hellmut Ludwig Späth =

German botanist and plant nursery owner murdered by the Nazi party

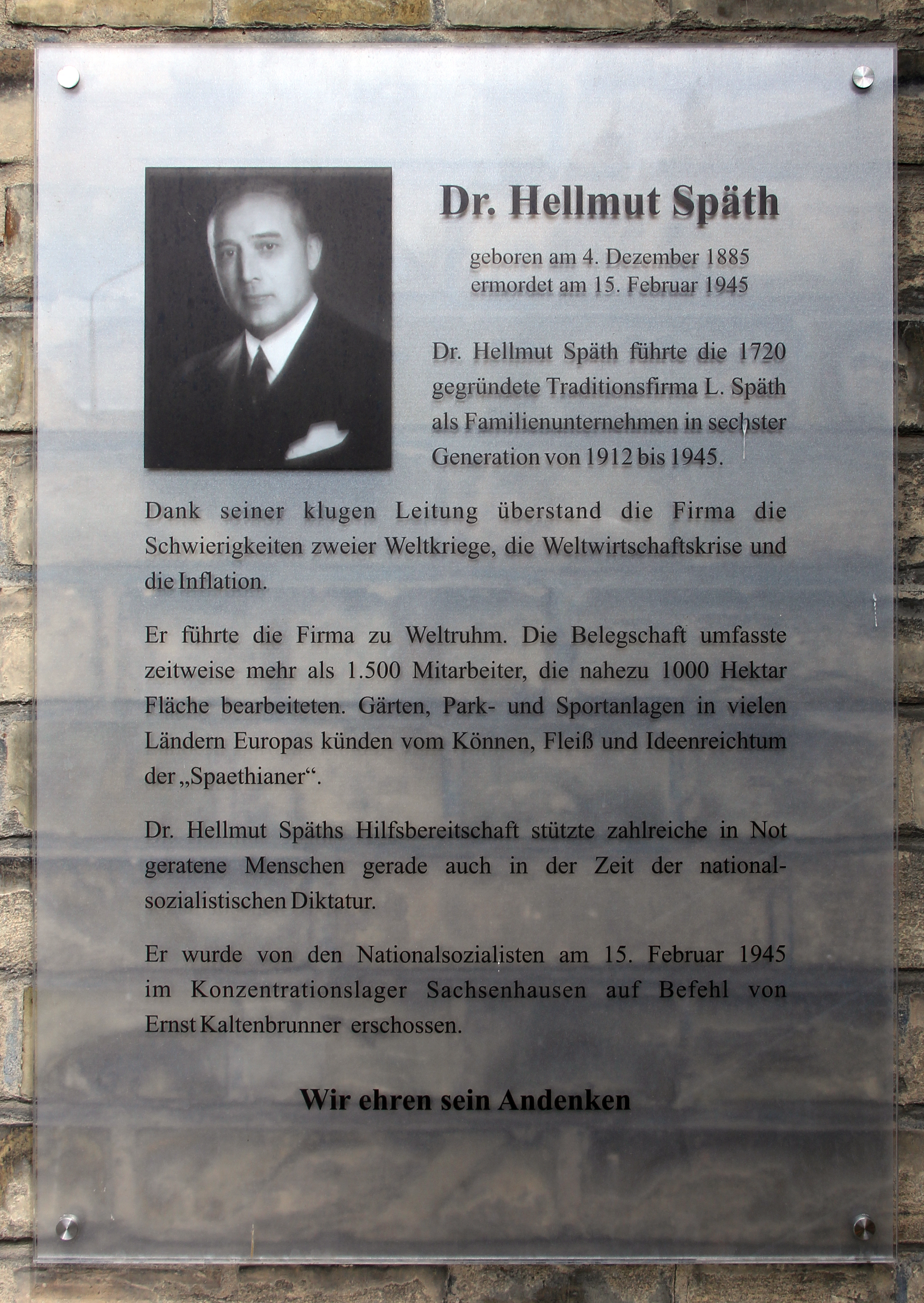
Memorial for Hellmut Späth, Späthstraße 80–81 in Berlin

Hellmut Ludwig Späth (4 December 1885 – 15 February 1945) was a German botanist and plant nursery owner, murdered by the Nazi party. His nursery is now Späth-Arboretum.

== Biography ==
He was born 4 December 1885, the son of Franz and Wilhelmine Späth, became the sixth and last manager of the Späth nursery on the death of his father in 1913. After studies at Cambridge, Hellmut returned to Berlin in 1910 and received his doctorate in 1912 from the Berlin Agricultural College. His dissertation was titled, The Locust Drive - a contribution to the knowledge of periodicity and annual ring formation in deciduous woody plants, and was published by Paul Parey.

Hellmut revived the nursery's fortunes during the Depression by joining the Nazi Party and obtaining lucrative landscaping contracts for the new autobahns and other public works. However, his outspoken criticism of the Nazi regime saw him incarcerated in Sachsenhausen concentration camp, where he was executed by firing squad in 1945. The nursery had closed in 1944, and in 1947 the arboretum passed into public ownership and became known as the Späthsches Arboretum.

In 2009, a Stolperstein (small, cobble stone-sized memorial plaque) was installed at his old school, Landesschule Pforta, to commemorate Späth as a victim of the Nazi regime.
