= Ulmus glabra 'Fastigiata Stricta' =

Elm cultivar

- Species: Ulmus glabra
- Cultivar: 'Fastigiata Stricta'
- Origin: Europe

The Wych Elm cultivar Ulmus glabra 'Fastigiata Stricta' was listed by Bean in Kew Hand-List Trees & Shrubs ed. 3. 273. 1925, but without description. It is possibly synonymous with U. glabra 'Fastigiata'.

== Description ==
Not available.

== Cultivation ==
No specimens are known to survive.
