= Frühauf =

Frühauf or Fruhauf is a German-language surname. Notable people with this surname include:

- Aline Fruhauf (1907–1978), American caricaturist and painter
- Peter Frühauf (1982), Slovak ice hockey player
- Tina Frühauf (1972), German-American musicologist

== See also ==
- Spaeth
