= Ulmus 'Fastigiata Glabra' =

Elm cultivar

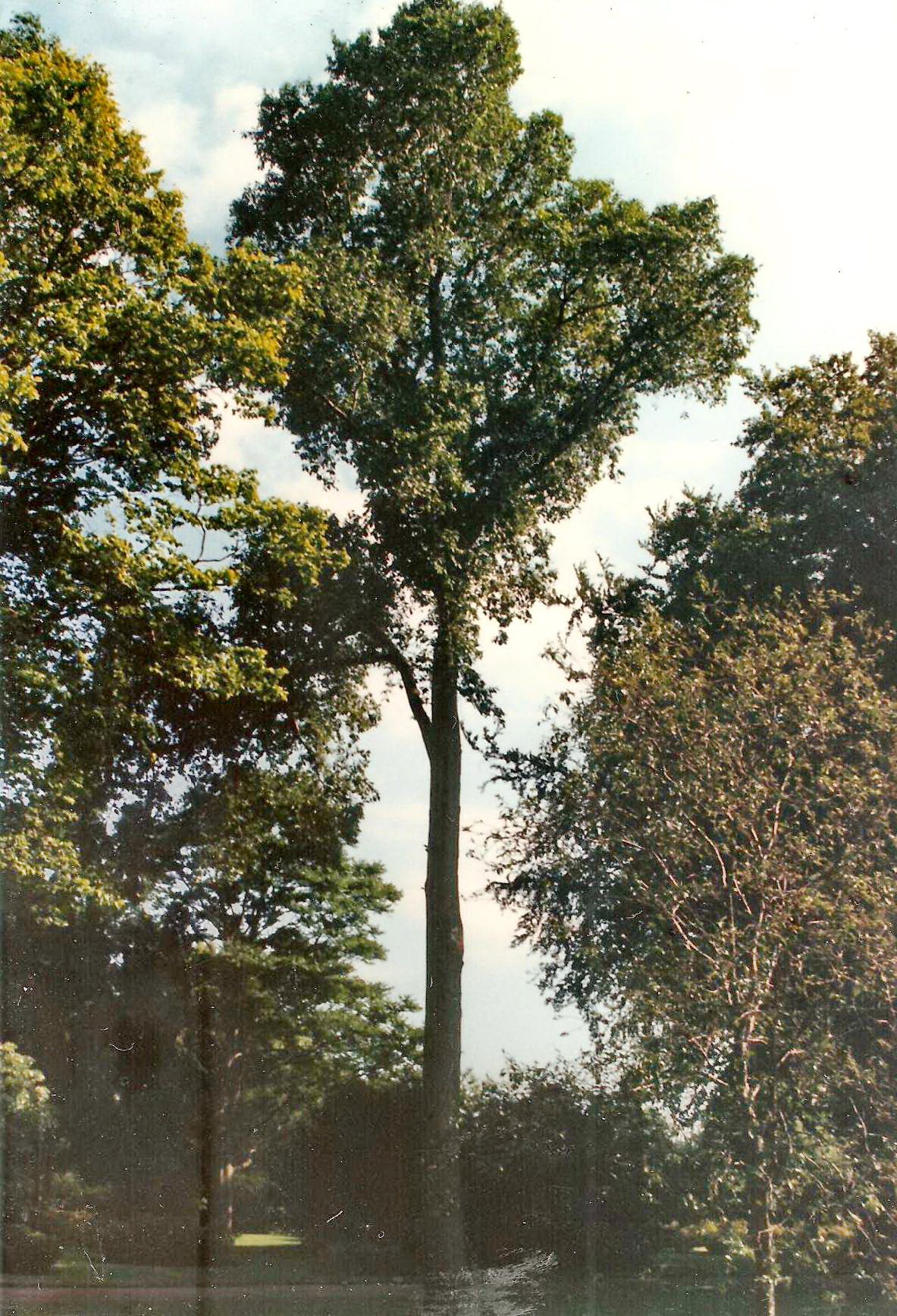
- Späth's 'Fastigiata Glabra' in Royal Botanic Garden Edinburgh (1989)
- Genus: Ulmus
- Cultivar: 'Fastigiata Glabra'
- Origin: Späth nursery, Berlin, Germany

The elm cultivar Ulmus 'Fastigiata Glabra' was distributed by the Späth nursery, Berlin, in the 1890s and early 1900s as U. montana fastigiata glabra. Späth used U. montana both for cultivars of wych elm and for those of some U. × hollandica hybrids like 'Dampieri'. A specimen of U. montana fastigiata glabra in the Royal Botanic Garden Edinburgh was determined by Melville in 1958 as a hybrid of the U. × hollandica group.

== Description ==
Späth's name implies that when young, at least, the tree had an upright form and smooth leaves.

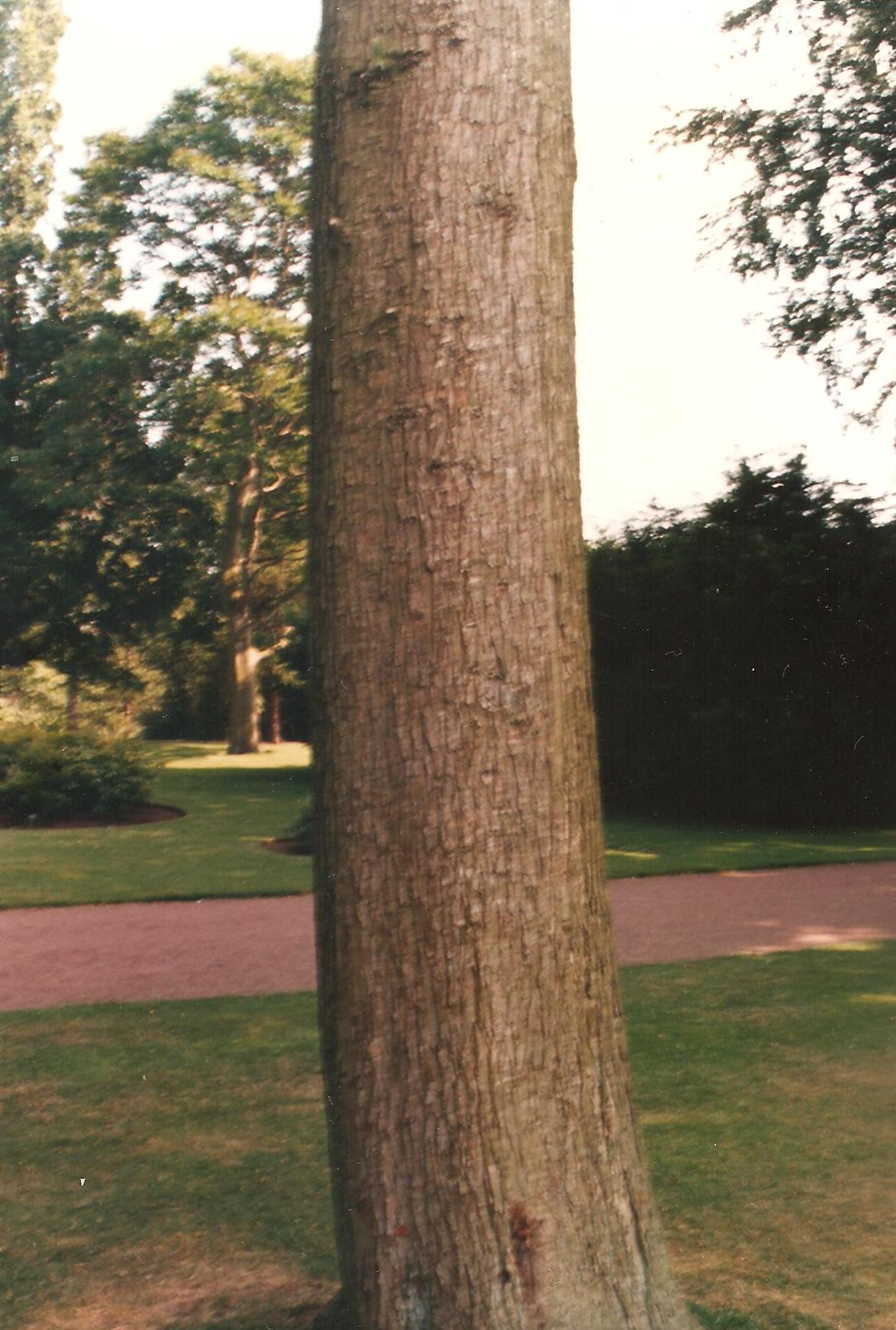
Bark of C2715, Edinburgh (see 'Cultivation')

== Pests and diseases ==
Not known. Some examples of the U. × hollandica group possess a moderate resistance to Dutch elm disease.

== Cultivation ==
One tree supplied by Späth was planted in 1898 as U. montana fastigiata glabra at the Dominion Arboretum, Ottawa, Canada. Three were supplied to the Royal Botanic Garden Edinburgh in 1902. One, in the Garden proper (tree C2715), was relabelled by Melville in 1958 U. glabra Huds. × U. carpinifolia [:U. minor ] × U. plotii [:U. minor 'Plotii' ]; it survived till the 1990s. Others may survive in Edinburgh, as it was the practice of the Garden to distribute trees about the city (viz. the Wentworth Elm); the current list of Living Accessions held in the Garden per se does not list the plant.

=== Putative specimen ===
An old glabrous-leaved hybrid elm in a more exposed position on The Mound, Edinburgh (2020), appears to match the 1958 RBGE herbarium leaf-specimen of U. montana fastigiata glabra (see 'External links' below) and may be a more spreading example of the cultivar.

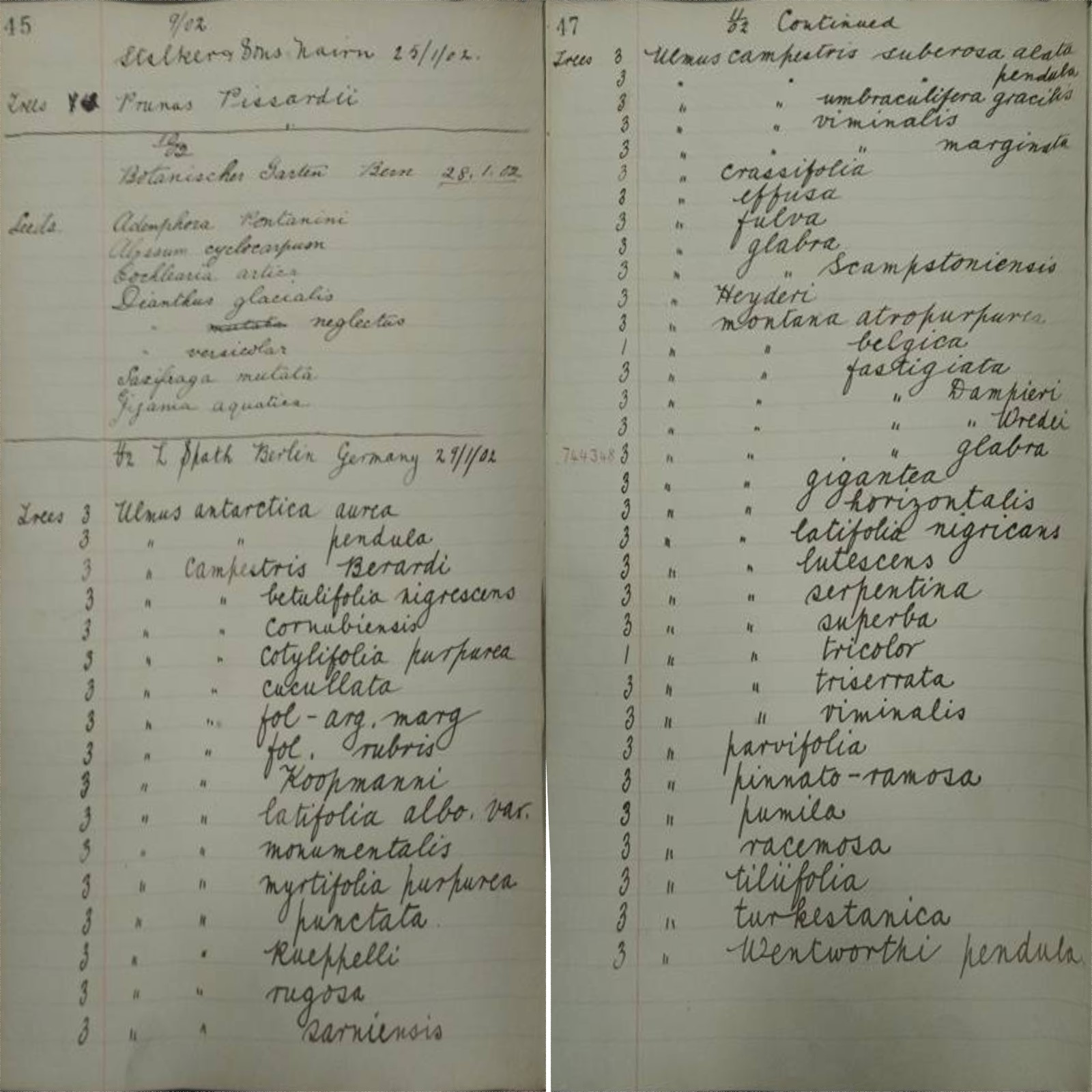
Pages from the RBGE Accessions Book (1902) listing U. montana fastigiata glabra

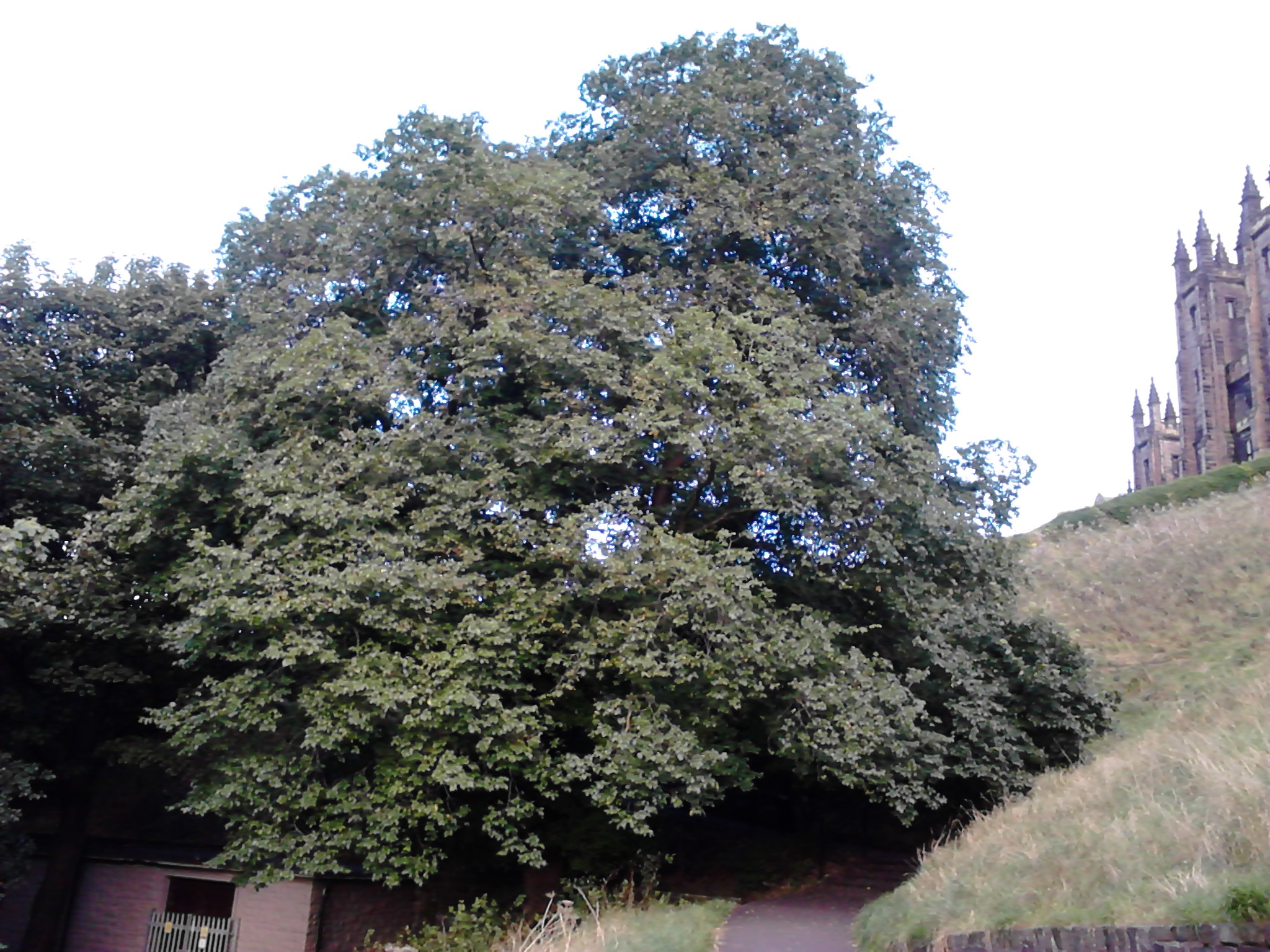
The Mound elm, Edinburgh

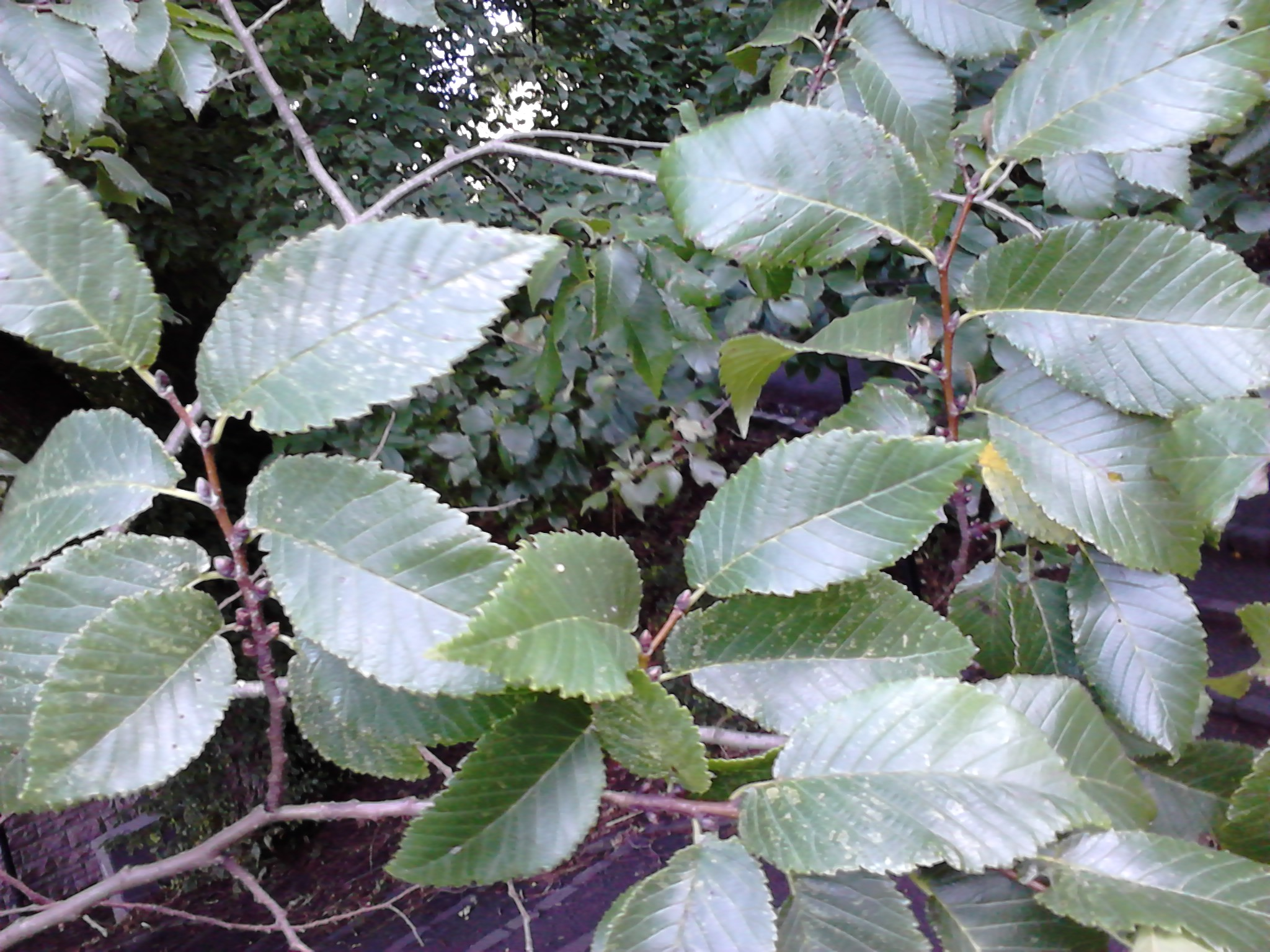
Foliage of same

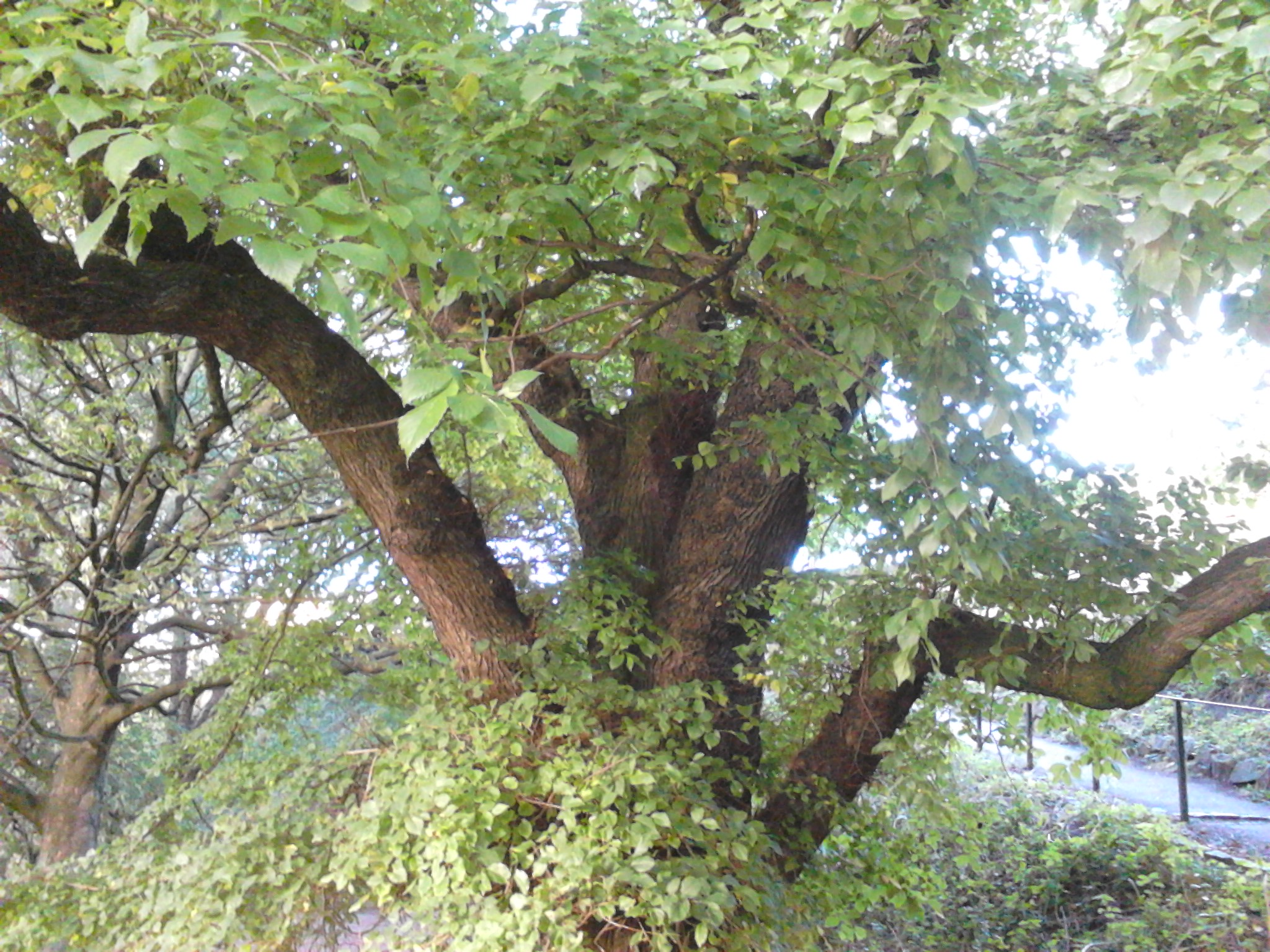
Branching

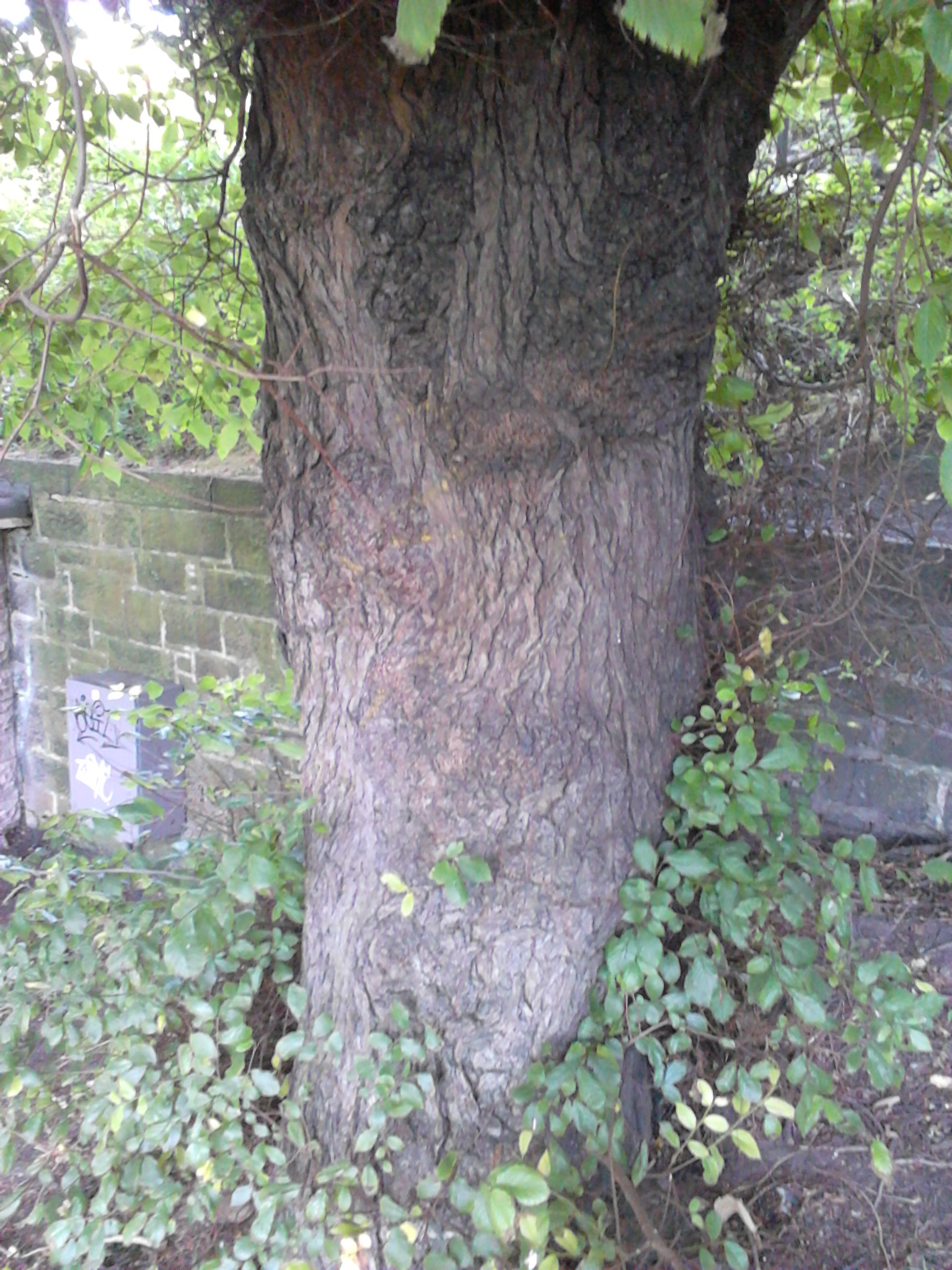
Bole

== Accessions ==
=== North America ===
- Dominion Arboretum, Ottawa, Canada. Accession no. 2602

=== Europe ===
None known.

== See also ==
U. montana fastigiata, Exeter elm Ulmus glabra, the wych elm, or Scots elm
