= Ulmus × hollandica 'Superba' =

Elm cultivar

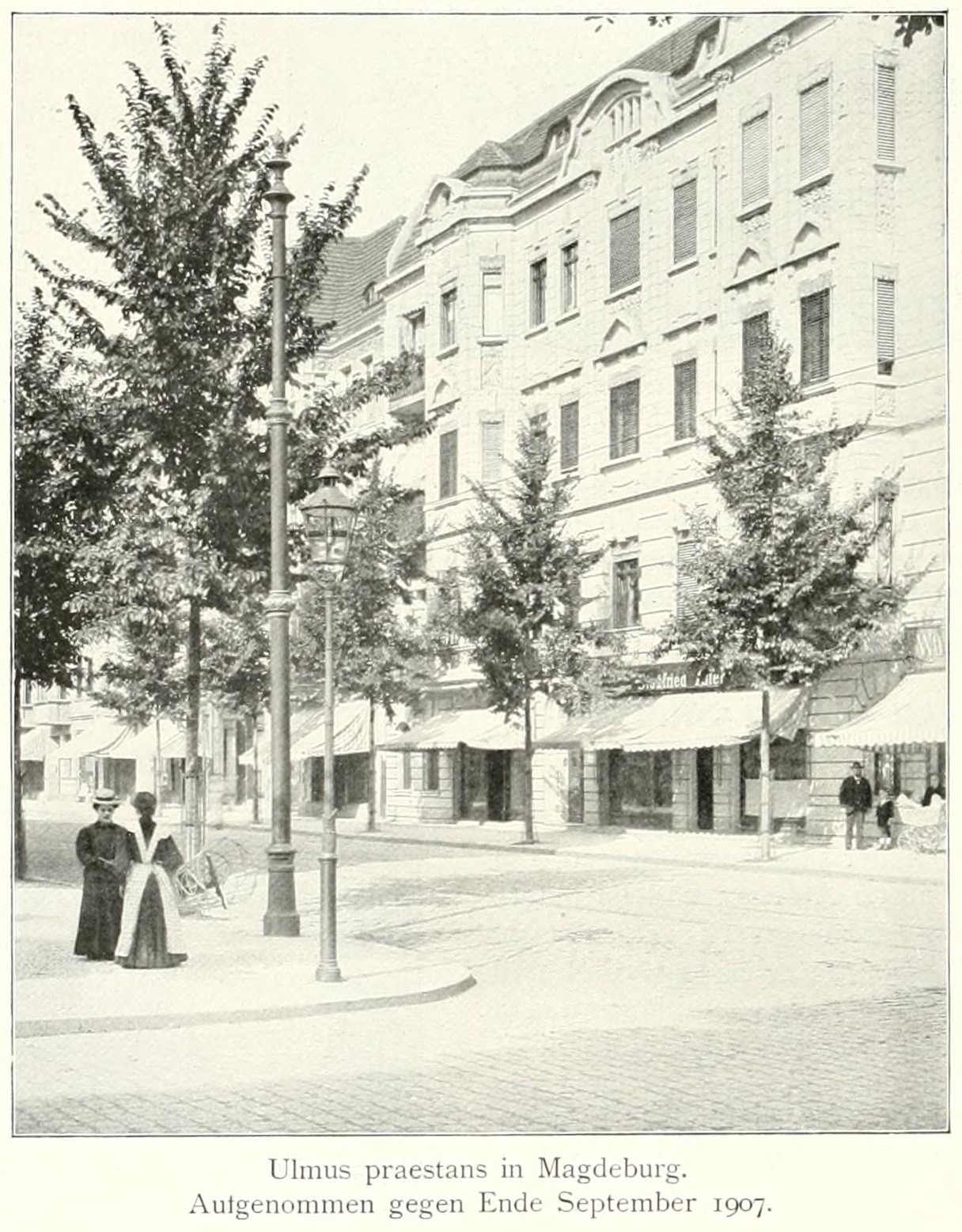
- 'Superba', Magdeburg, 1907 (described here by its synonym, Ulmus praestans E. Schoch)
- Hybrid parentage: U. glabra × U. minor
- Cultivar: 'Superba'
- Origin: Europe

The hybrid elm cultivar Ulmus × hollandica 'Superba' is one of a number of intermediate forms arising from the crossing of the Wych Elm U. glabra with a variety of Field Elm U. minor. Boulger tentatively (1881) and Green more confidently (1964) equated it with a hybrid elm cultivated in the UK by Masters at Canterbury in the early 19th century, known as "Masters' Canterbury Seedling" or simply the Canterbury Elm. Loudon examined a specimen sent by Masters and considered it a hybrid, calling it U. montana glabra major (not to be confused with U. major Smith, U. × hollandica 'Major').

Krüssmann (1962, 1984) and Green (1964), however, incorrectly equated Masters' Canterbury Elm with Osborne's U. montana var. superba (originally Gill's Blandford Elm, U. montana superba), a wych cultivar with unusually large leaves described by Lindley in The Gardeners' Chronicle, 1845, though Loudon had made no reference to large leaves. Rehder (1915 & 1949) did not include this identification in his list of synonyms.

An U. praestans E. Schoch, cultivated in Europe in the late 19th century and said by Krüssmann (1984) to have originated in Belgium, was equated by him with U. × hollandica 'Superba'. A 1907 photograph shows an avenue of elms in Magdeburg, Germany, described in the accompanying article by Heinricy as U. praestans E. Schoch, a "hybrid between U. scabra [U. glabra] and U. campestris [U. minor]" – i.e. as a form of U. × hollandica. 'Superba' was reputed by Louis Späth to have been "much esteemed as a street tree in Magdeburg" – presumably the clone in the photograph. This suggests that Späth regarded U. praestans as synonymous with 'Superba'. A 'Superba' had appeared in Späth's catalogues from 1885, from descriptions, however, probably the large-leaved wych cultivar U. montana superba of Morren, not U. praestans. Späth's catalogue of 1911–12 erroneously claimed that U. praestans E. Schoch was synonymous with Morren's U. montana superba. Hartwig, who received specimens of U. praestans from Kiessling of the Magdeburg city nursery in 1908, pointed out (1912) that "Ulmus montana superba, supposedly the same [as U. praestans], looks quite different when young, being wide with large, broad, dull green leaves, whereas U. praestans and U. glabra [Mill.] fastigiata show an elongated medium-sized shiny green leaf and densely pyramidal crown". He concluded that U. praestans was not Morren's Ulmus montana superba, but was indistinguishable in leaf or habit from the cultivar U. glabra Mill. fastigiata Kirchner. Späth admitted the error in an article in Möller's Deutsche Gärtner-Zeitung (1912), confirming that U. praestans E. Schoch was an U. × hollandica hybrid, and implying that Morren's tree was a form of U. montana (Wych Elm), and corrected it in his later catalogues, distinguishing between Morren's Ulmus montana superba and U. praestans E. Schoch (for which he adopted Henry's synonym Ulmus superba Henry), and marketing both cultivars in the interwar period. U. superba Henry was a 'Superba' from Späth himself, planted at Kew in 1900, which Henry had described in 1913. This confirms that Späth had also been marketing U. praestans as 'Superba' in the late 19th century. An undated herbarium specimen from Haarlem showing a hybrid cultivar labelled "U. × hollandica 'Superba' Rehd., received as U. praestans from Späth, Berlin" matches Henry's description of Späth's tree planted in 1900 at Kew.

Any link between Canterbury Elm (Loudon's U. montana glabra major), in cultivation in England throughout the 19th century (see below), and U. praestans E. Schoch, in cultivation in Europe in the late 19th century, is unknown, but Loudon's description of a fast-growing hybrid like Huntingdon Elm, holding its leaves late, matches descriptions of U. praestans. Herbarium specimens of hybrid 'Superba' vary, however, confirming that, in addition to Morren's wych 'Superba', more than one U. × hollandica cultivar was given the name.

== Description ==
Descriptions of 'Superba' vary. Loudon described Ulmus montana glabra major, 'Canterbury Seedling', as a hybrid similar to Huntingdon Elm in bark and vigour, but more spreading in form, and holding its leaves late.

Henry's description (1913) of Ulmus superba Henry is based on a tree at Kew from Späth, planted in 1900. Recognizing this clone as a hybrid, Henry listed it among what are now called U. × hollandica cultivars, as a rapidly growing, narrow, pyramidal tree with smooth bark and steeply ascending branches. It bore large smooth biserrate dark green leaves, 8–12 cm (3–4 in) long and 4–6 cm broad, very oblique at the base and similar to those of the Wych Elm, but with petioles 5–10 mm long. The flowers too resemble those of the Wych Elm. Henry noted that a tree grown at Kew labelled U. montana macrophylla fastigiata was "similar in all respects" to Späth's 1900 'Superba'.

Späth (1930) described the U. × hollandica hybrid U. praestans Schoch, which he said was synonymous with the U. superba Henry that he himself had supplied to Kew, as "a vigorous tree with upswept branches and large dark green foliage, lasting long into the autumn". Krüssman (1984), though he erroneously listed Morren's 'Superba' as a synonym, described U. × hollandica 'Superba' / U. praestans Schoch as a hybrid with leaves 8–12 cm with 15–18 pairs of veins (he includes a leaf-drawing), retained late into autumn, and an elliptic samarae 1.5–2 cm long with the seed nearly central.

According to Fontaine (1968), the leaves of U. × hollandica 'Superba' are smaller than those of Huntingdon Elm, U. × hollandica 'Vegeta', and a lighter green, with yellow veins. From his reference to Schleswig, where it was cultivated (see below), Fontaine may have been describing U. praestans Schoch.

Berndt (1915) reported that "U. montana superba, a tree known in the Magdeburg region as Ulmus praestans", was "easy to confuse with" the similarly fastigiate but less vigorous U. glabra Mill. fastigiata. The leaves of the former are "less broad and slightly lighter in colour, smoother, finer and more evenly veined".

== Pests and diseases ==
No cultivar called 'Superba' is noted to have any resistance to Dutch elm disease.

== Cultivation ==
An "Ulmus montana glabra major, the Canterbury Seedling", was described at the Royal Victoria Park, Bath (Royal Avenue), in 1857 and 1902.

A hybrid 'Superba' from Späth was introduced to the UK at Kew Gardens in 1900. Given Späth's pre-1912 naming error, it is not clear whether one planting of U. montana superba at the Dominion Arboretum, Ottawa, Canada, in 1896, sourced from Späth, was the hybrid or the wych 'Superba'. The specimen (no. 42304) maintained as part of a low hedge at Wakehurst Place, Sussex (2020), grown from a cutting from Ottawa donated in 1949, is, however, listed as the hybrid 'Superba', suggesting that the 1896 Ottawa planting may likewise have been the hybrid. Herbarium specimens show that three hybrid U. montana superba were sent by Späth to the Royal Botanic Garden Edinburgh in 1902; these may survive in Edinburgh, as it was the practice of the Garden to distribute trees about the city (viz. the Wentworth Elm); the current list of Living Accessions held in the Garden per se does not list the plant. Henry noted that a tree grown at Kew labelled U. montana macrophylla fastigiata was similar in all respects to Späth's 'Superba'. A 'Superba' is not on any accessions list of identified surviving trees in the UK, save the specimen maintained as part of a low hedge at Wakehurst Place.

As well as the Magdeburg plantings and the post-war Späth distribution noted above, the Hesse Nursery of Weener, Germany, supplied U. praestans Schoch in the 1930s, resuming supply of the cultivar after the Second World War. Fifty-four U. × hollandica 'Superba' were planted in Dalgas Boulevard, Frederiksberg, Copenhagen, Denmark, in 1920, in the section of the boulevard north of the railway viaduct, with some specimens surviving to 1985. Heybroek reported (1963) that 'Praestans' was regularly planted in Schleswig.

A specimen stood in Garfield Park, Washington D.C., in the mid-20th century.

=== Putative specimens in the UK ===
One putative specimen survives in the UK, a large hybrid elm in Stanmer Park Arboretum, Brighton, with 'Superba'-like steeply ascending branches, and leaves matching 'Superba' herbarium specimens.

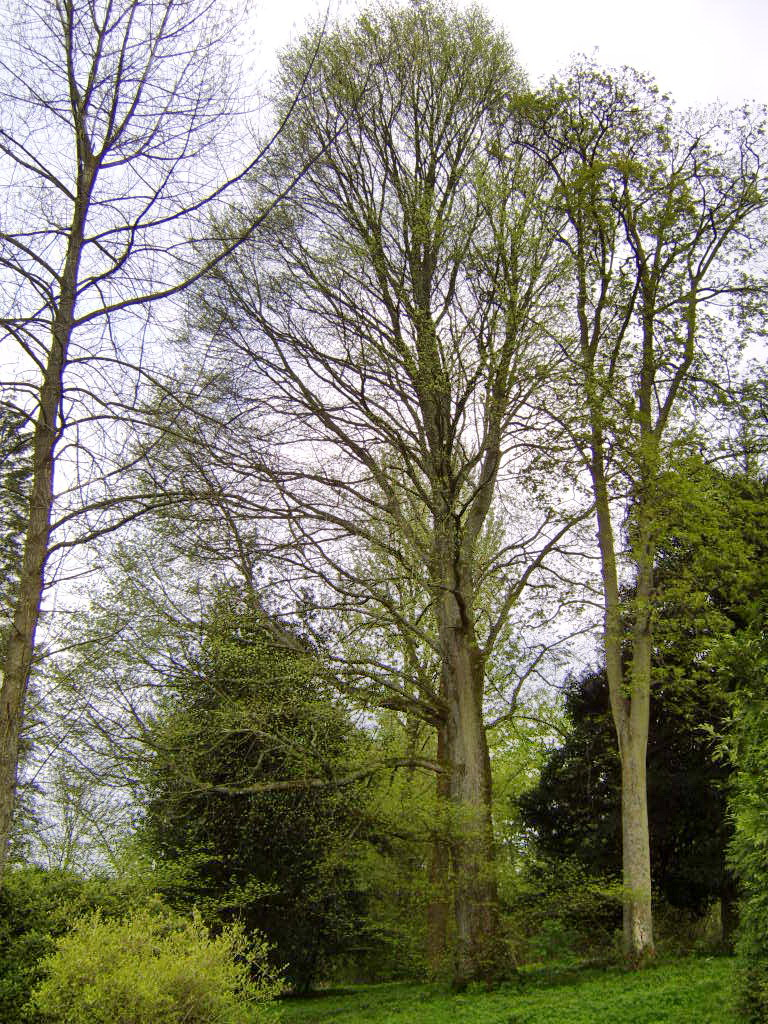
Stanmer Park Arboretum elm, Brighton (2005)

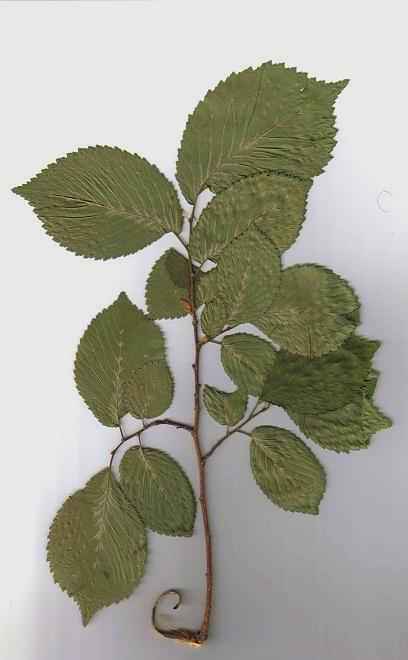
Pressed leaves of same

An old narrowly pyramidal U. × hollandica with steeply ascending branches, which stood in Regent Road Park, Edinburgh, till 2017, had leaves that appeared to match the RBGE 1902 herbarium-specimen of U. montana superba.

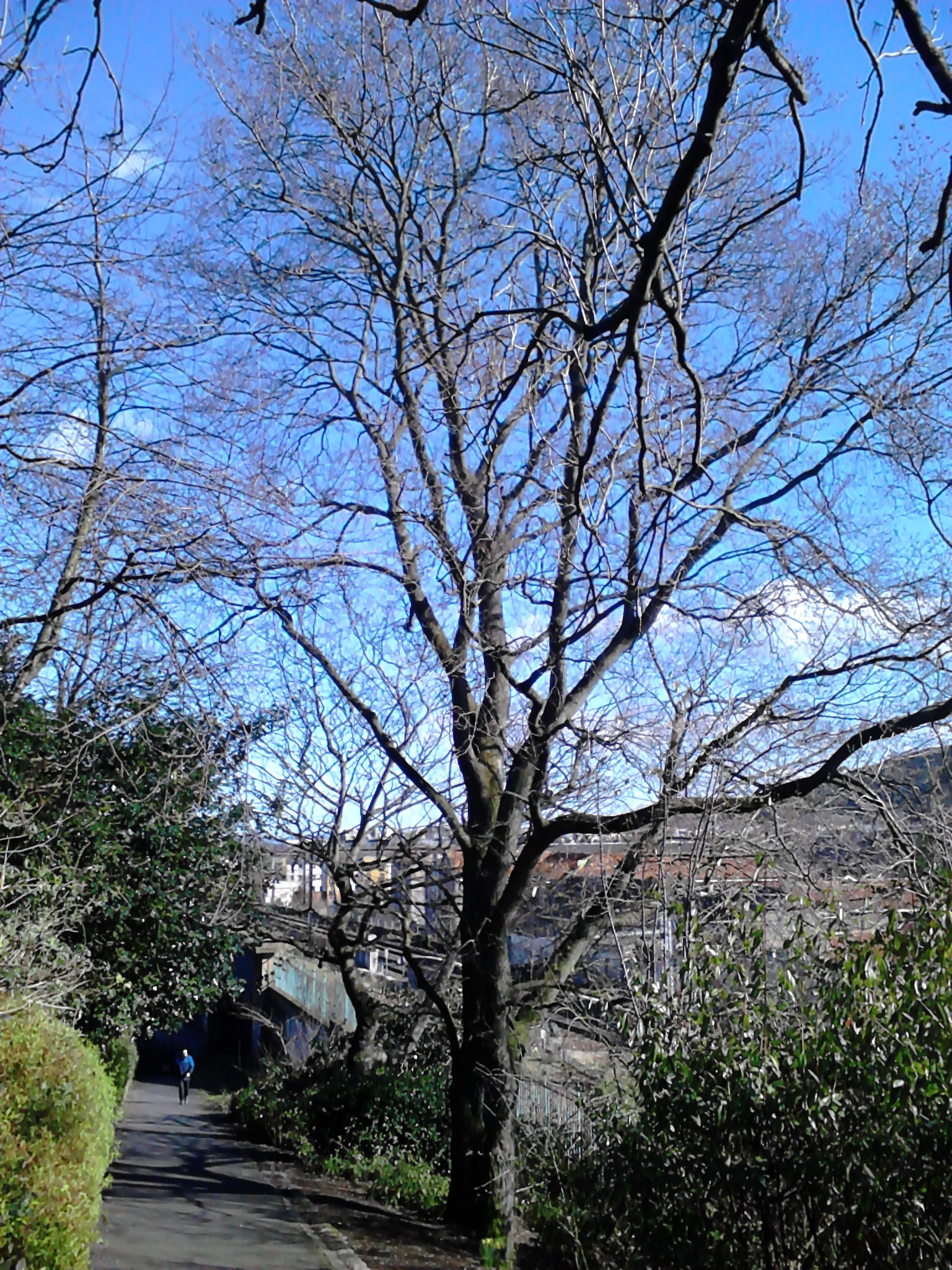
Regent Road Park elm, Edinburgh

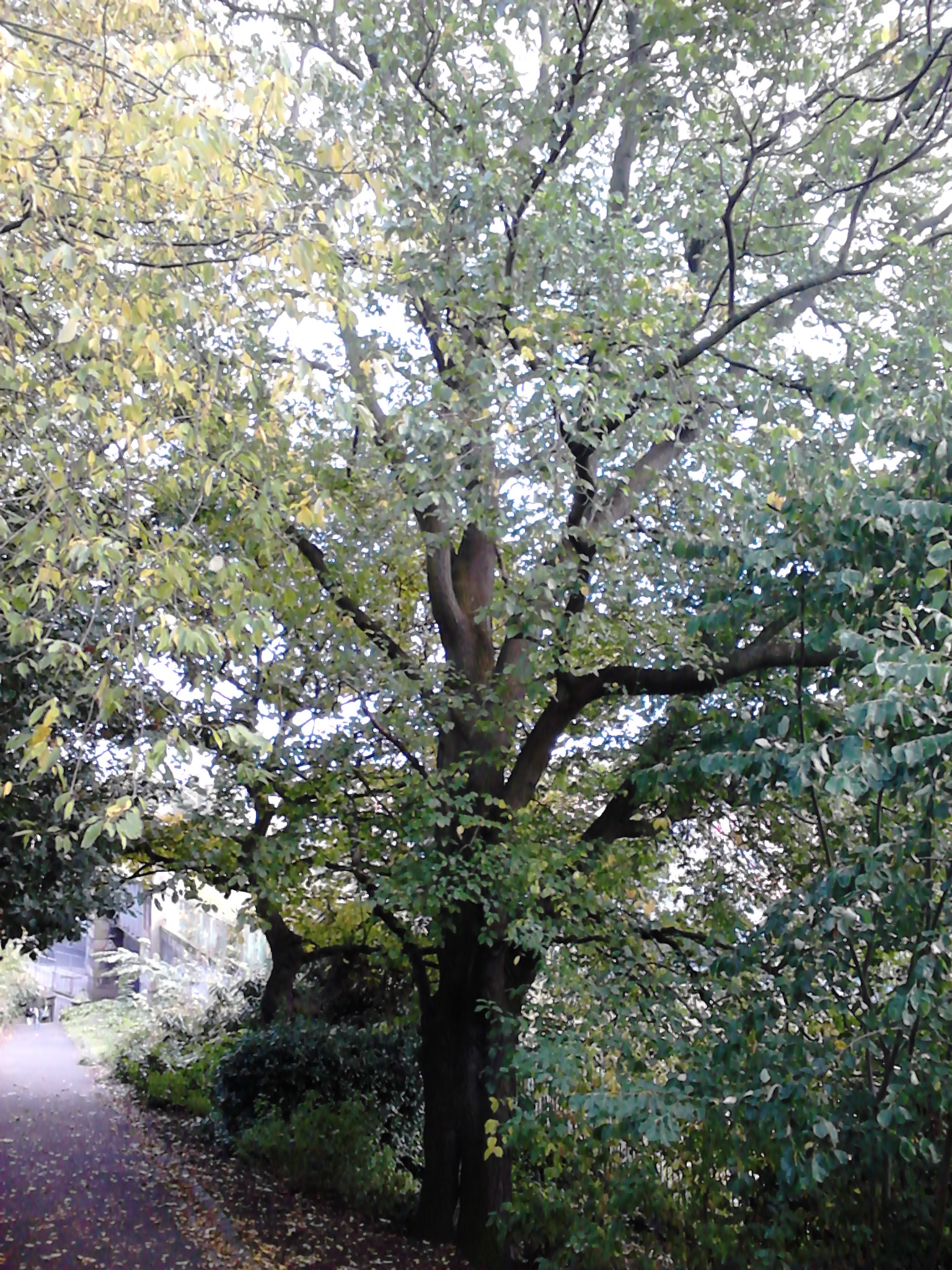
Same

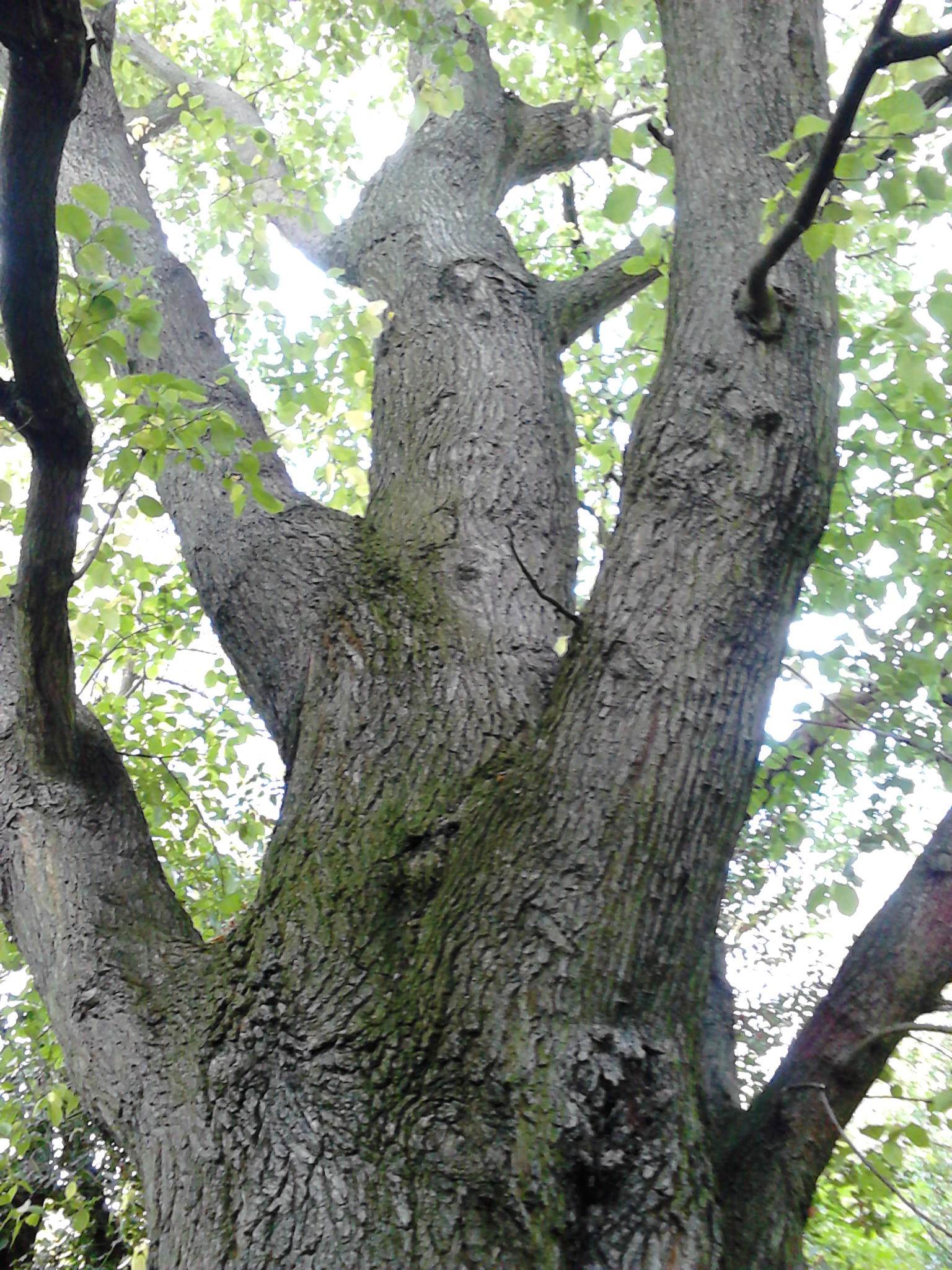
Branching of same

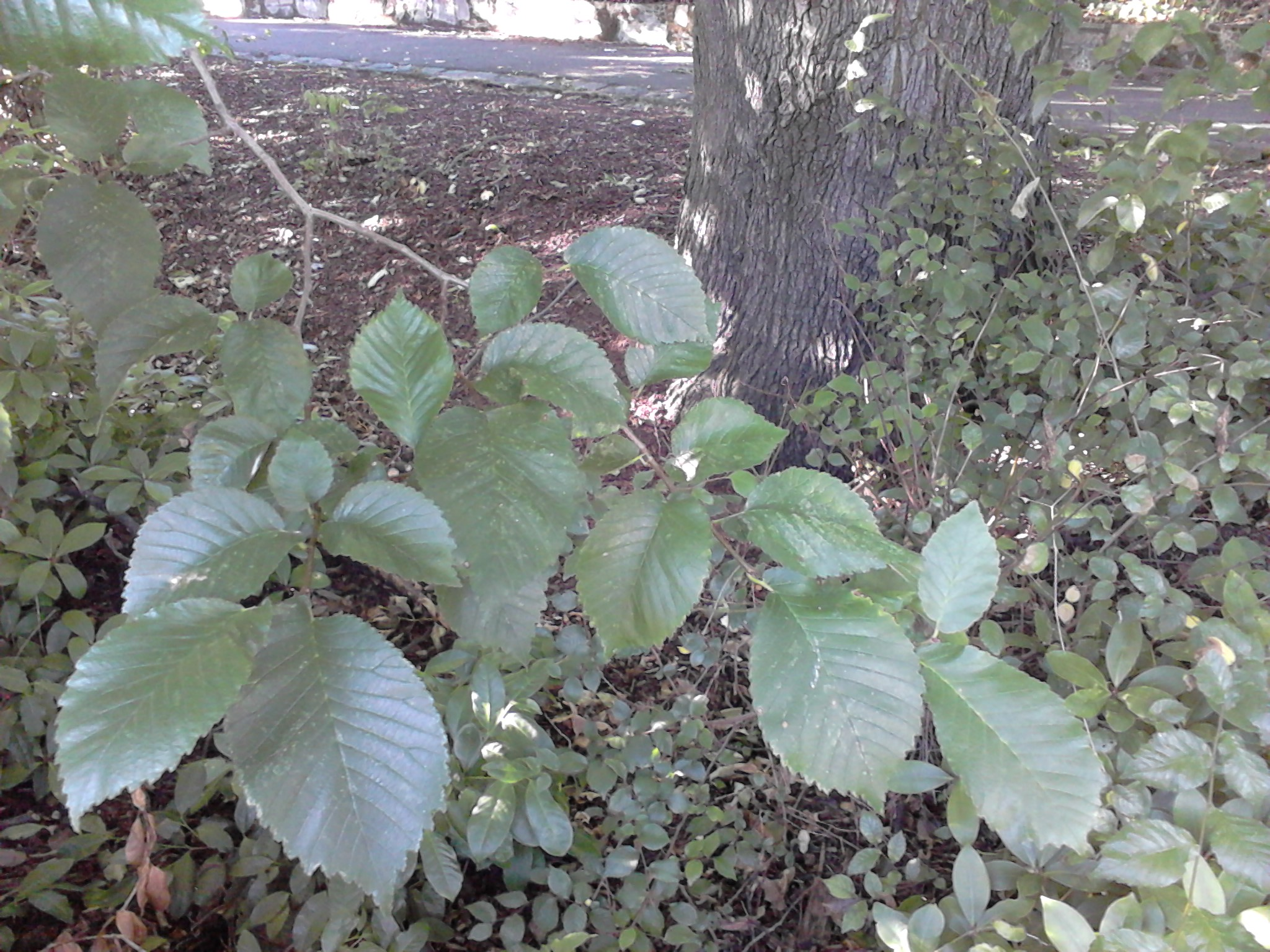
Foliage

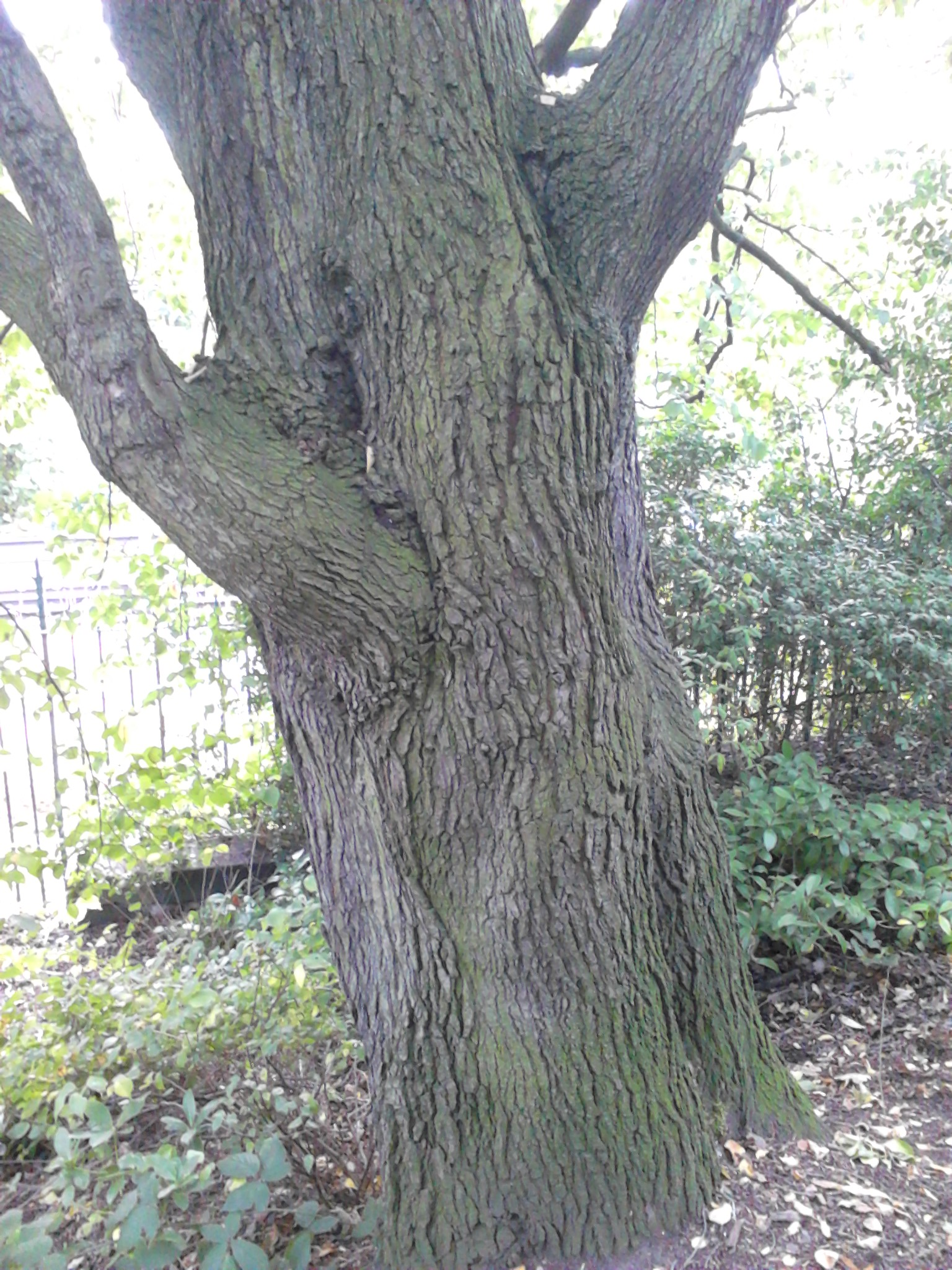
Bole

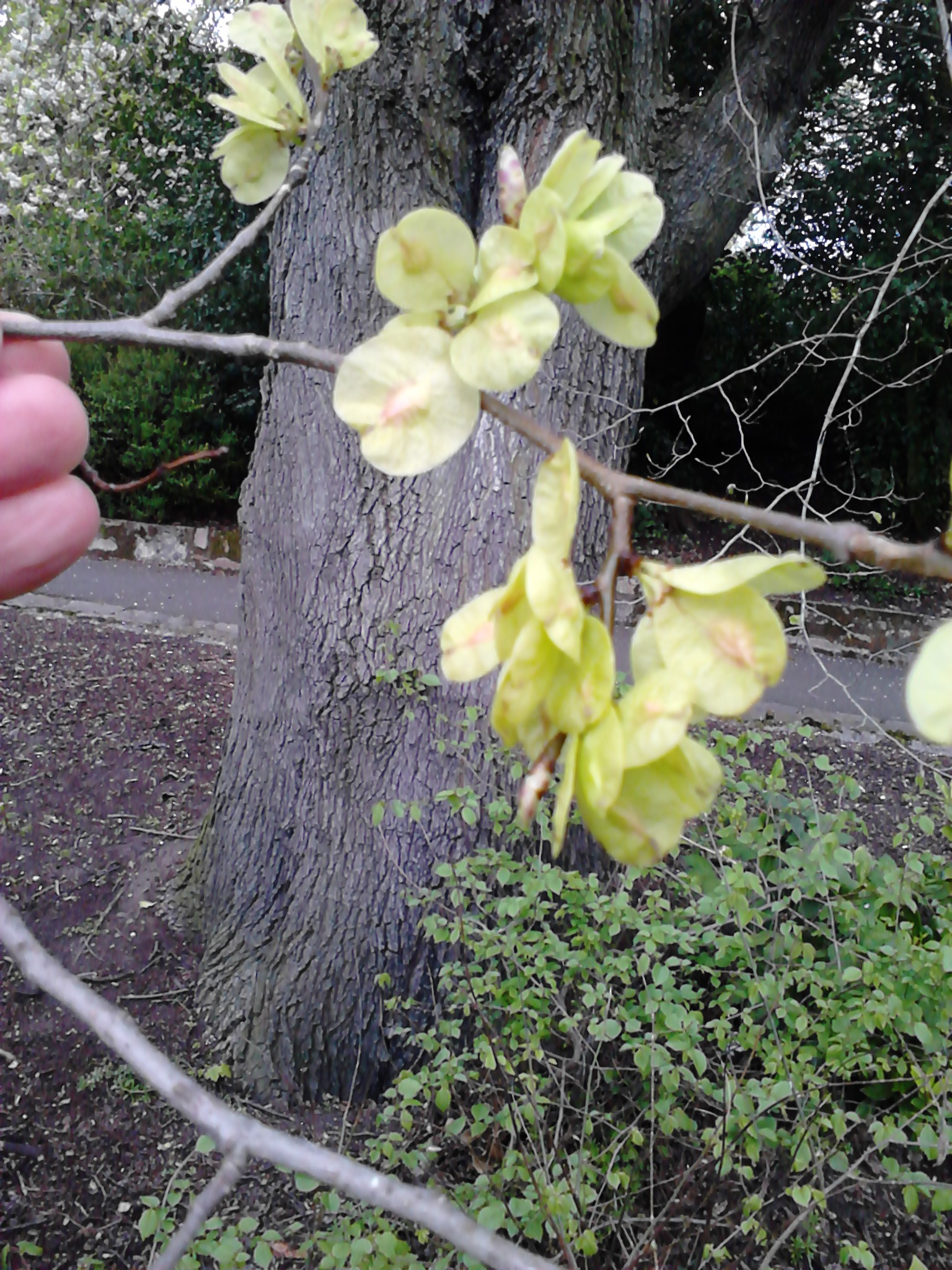
Samarae

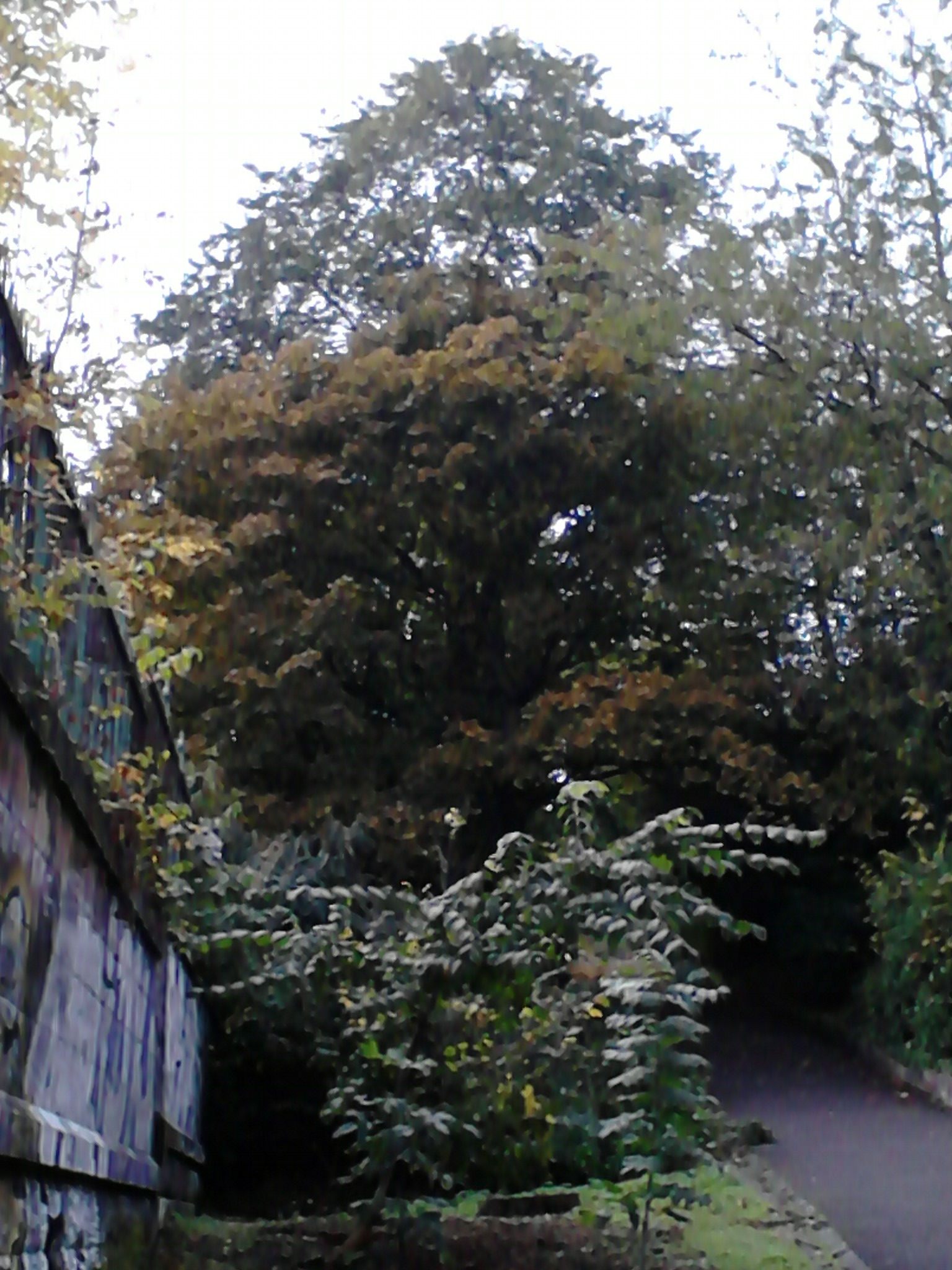
Pyramidal shape of Regent Road Park elm (background)

== Synonymy ==
- Ulmus montana (:glabra) var. major Masters: Loudun, Arboretum et Fruticetum Britannicum, 3: 1398, 1838.
- Ulmus montana (:glabra) 'Superba' Lavallée, in error for 'Cornuta'.
- Ulmus superba A. Henry
- Ulmus praestans Schoch. NB Green credits authorship to Jacob Beterams.

== Accessions ==
Europe

- Wakehurst Place Garden, Wakehurst Place, UK. Acc. no. 1949–42304
