= Lillian Pringle Baldauf =

American cellist (1880–1964)

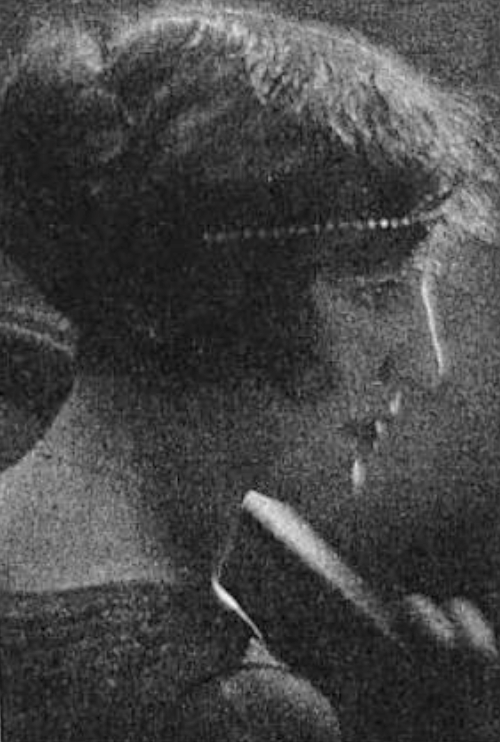
- Lillian Pringle, from a 1927 publication
- Born: Lillian Pringle; December 27, 1880; Danville, Illinois, U.S.
- Died: January 5, 1964 (age 83); Kalamazoo, Michigan, U.S.
- Occupation: Cellist

Lillian Pringle Baldauf (December 27, 1880 – January 5, 1964) was an American cellist. She taught at Kalamazoo College in Michigan.

== Early life and education ==
Pringle was born in Danville, Illinois, the daughter of James Lewis Pringle and Dovie Estelle Polk Pringle. In her youth she played cello in the Pringle Concert Company with her older sister Agnes, a violinist. She graduated from Chicago Musical College.

== Career ==
Pringle was a cellist who performed across the United States in the 1910s and 1920s. She was a member of the Women's Symphony Orchestra of Chicago, the Kalamazoo Symphony Orchestra, and the Joseffer String Quartette of Chicago. In 1918 she was advertised as "the greatest woman cello virtuoso in the world."

She toured with baritone Bernardo Olshanky in 1921, and with singer Katherine Browne in Missouri, Oklahoma, and Mississippi in 1925. She gave recitals and played in churches and community events in the Chicago area later in the 1920s. "Her tone is noble, sonorous, suave, and absolutely convincing," according to a 1927 review in a Toronto newspaper. "Sympathetic beyond everything, it never sinks to mere sentimentalism."

After marriage, she taught cello at Kalamazoo College, where she was also conductor of the Instrumental Ensemble. She was a founder of the Little Symphony Orchestra of Kalamazoo. She also taught at Western Michigan University, where she played a faculty quartet and was active in the school's annual Bach Festival. In her later years she gave private lessons in cello and piano in Kalamazoo.

== Personal life ==
Pringle married fellow cellist Hans Bruno Baldauf. They were both active in the Kalamazoo Amateur Astronomical Association. She died in 1964, at the age of 83, at her home in Kalamazoo. The Lillian Pringle Baldauf Prize in Music is an award at Kalamazoo College, funded in her memory.
