= Späth-Arboretum =

Arboretum in Berlin, Germany

Coordinates: 52.4549°N 13.4748°E

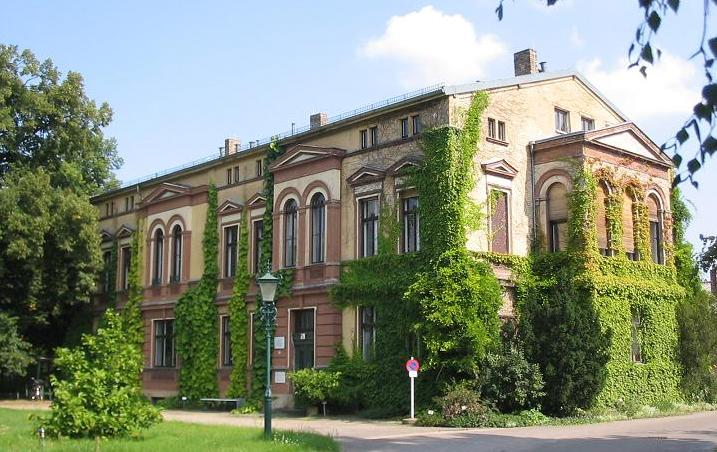
Franz Späth's villa in the arboretum

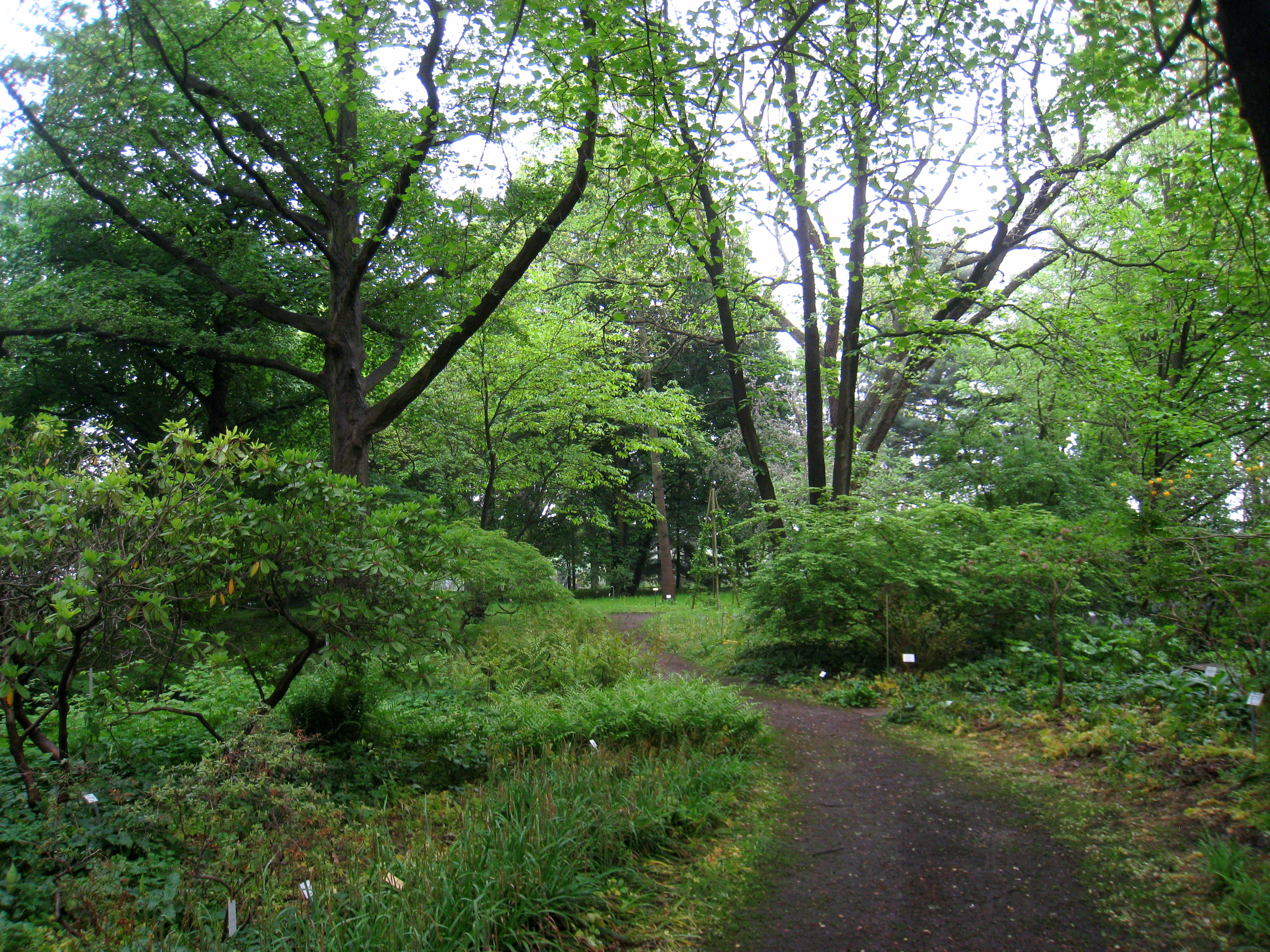
Späth-Arboretum

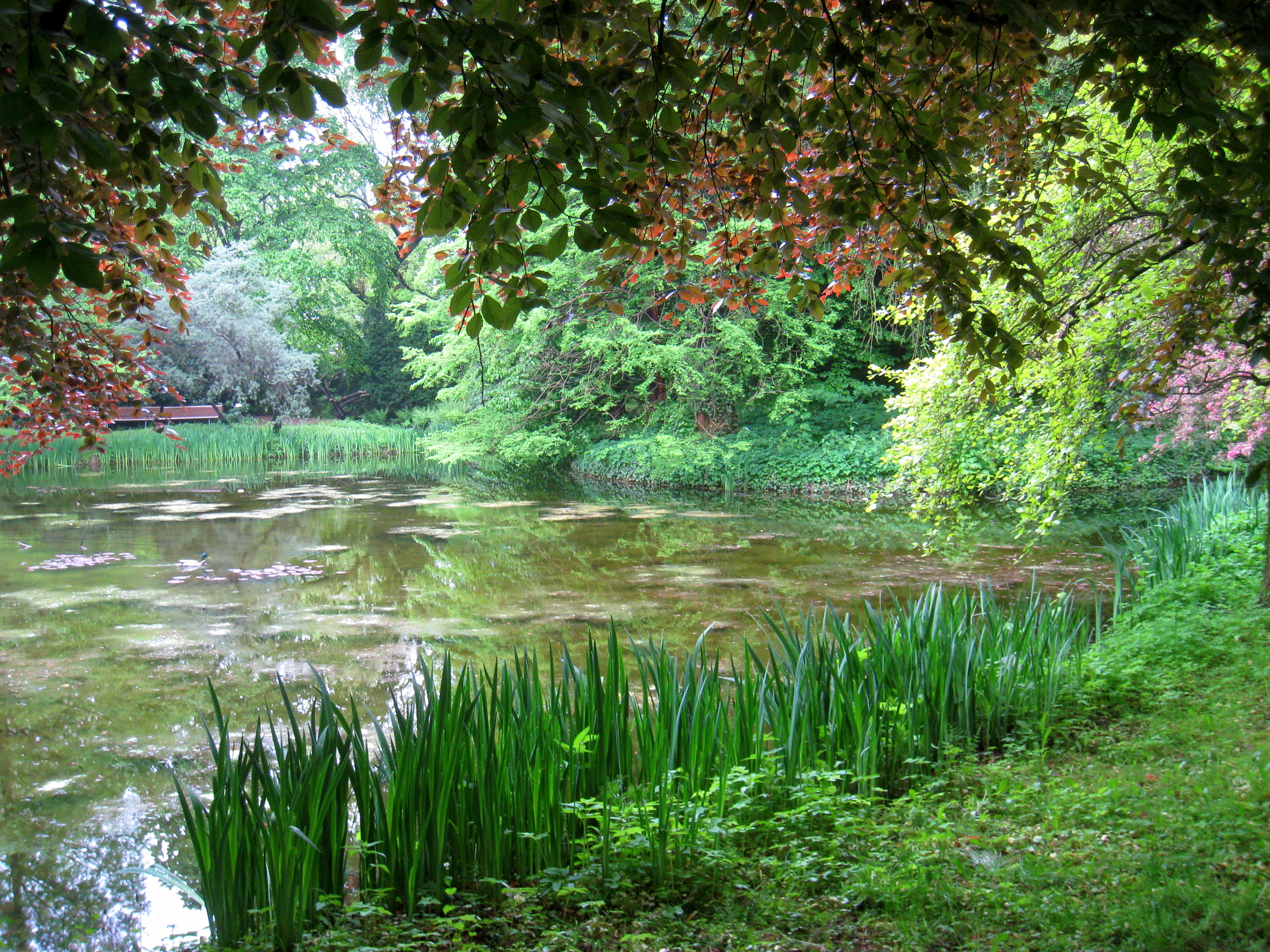
Späth-Arboretum

The Späth-Arboretum (3.5 hectares) is an arboretum now maintained by the Humboldt University of Berlin. It is located at Späthstraße 80/81, Berlin, Germany, and open several days per week in the warmer months.

== About ==
The arboretum was begun in 1879 by Franz Ludwig Späth, owner of the world's largest and oldest tree nursery (Späth nursery, founded 1720), when he expanded the garden around his 1874 villa. Berlin city gardener Gustav Meyer designed the arboretum in the style of an English garden. On Franz's death in 1913, ownership passed to his son Hellmut, who added a rock garden to the centre in 1928. The first arboretum catalogue published in 1930 listed almost 4,500 taxa.

Hellmut was executed in Sachsenhausen in 1945; ownership passed to a trust in 1947, and then to the people in 1949. When the university's Institute for Special Botany was created, it was given the villa and arboretum as its home in 1961. In 1966 the grounds were opened to the public four Sundays a year for concerts, a tradition which continues to this day. In 1969 the institute became affiliated with the university's Museum of Natural History, and in 1981 a series of six postal stamps entitled "Rare trees from the Arboretum" was issued.

Today the arboretum contains more than 1,200 exotic trees and bushes from Asia, Africa, and America for research and display. Its total holdings include about 4,000 plant species with a systematic collection of herbaceous plants, medicinal and aromatic garden, and rock garden.

== See also ==
- Botanical Garden in Berlin
- List of botanical gardens in Germany
