= Joachim Baldauf =

German photographer and publisher (born 1965)

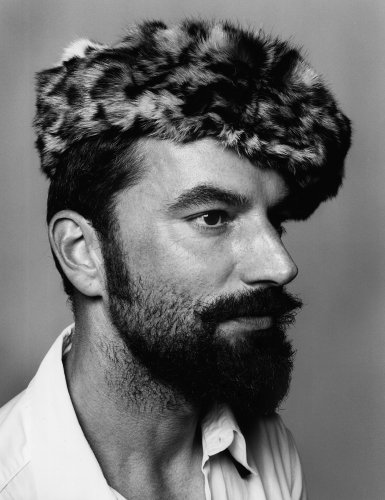
- Born: 20 July 1965 (age 61); Weiler, West Germany
- Education: Technikum Reutlingen
- Occupations: Photographer, publisher, art director
- Known for: Work for Wallpaper*; Co-founder of Printkultur and Vorn magazine

Joachim Baldauf (* 20 July 1965 in Weiler, Germany) is a German photographer and publisher. He currently lives in Berlin.

== Biography ==
Joachim Baldauf began his studies in textile design at the Technikum Reutlingen in 1984, where he graduated with a degree in 1987. He went on to create textile designs for Holzhauser Textildesign, Rueff Muntlix, Stragapede Didra and others. From 1989 to 1998, Baldauf worked as a graphic designer and art director for magazines and other clients such as Adidas, Bertelsmann Music Group, Cosmopolitan, Doc Martens, Helmut Lang/Sucrow-Barthel, Levi's, MAC and others. In 1992, together with Gabriele Grammelsberger and Dieter Brachtl, he founded the agency Boom Communication in Munich, which published magazines including Nachtschwärmer and Lavabo. Since 1998, Joachim Baldauf has worked as a freelance photographer for numerous international magazines and has photographed a variety of advertising campaigns. Baldauf also supports charity projects through his work with organisations such as Doctors Without Borders, the Altonaer Museum, the German Red Cross, Dunkelziffer e.V., Internationales Kindercamp Sans Souci and Pro Organ. From 1999 to 2002 he collaborated extensively with the London-based magazine Wallpaper*, where he was responsible for approximately 30 editorials and covers. In 2004, together with the graphic designer Agnes Feckl, Baldauf founded the publishing house Printkultur, which publishes the magazine Vorn as well as a variety of books. Since 2009, he has worked as a lecturer and guest speaker at various universities, including the Maastricht Academy of Fine Arts and Design, the Dortmund University of Applied Sciences and Arts, Fefè Project in Rome, the University of the Arts Bremen, the Hochschule für Technik und Wirtschaft in Berlin, the Merz Akademie in Stuttgart and the Berlin University of the Arts.

== Exhibitions ==
Since 2002, Joachim Baldauf has been the subject of various solo exhibitions, and he has also participated in a number of group exhibitions in galleries and institutions.

- Jeden Tag ein wenig, AMD, Munich, 2002
- Der subjektive Mann, Galerie Rössler, Munich, 2002
- Le charme discret de la bourgeoisie, Galerie Viaux, Hamburg, 2003
- Deichtorhallen/Haus der Photographie, Hamburg, 2003, 2004, 2005, 2007
- Private Collection, curated by Thorsten Heinze, Sevenstargallery, Berlin, 2007
- Mode ist tot – Von Virusverbreitern und Gratwanderern, curated by Werner Hanak-Lettner, Haus Wittgenstein, Vienna, 2008
- Be an Angel, Camerawork, Berlin, 2008
- Fashion, Camerawork, Berlin, 2009
- The Wallpaper* Years, curated by Claudia Seidel, Galerie im Regierungsviertel, Berlin, 2009
- Meissen Macht Ikonen, curated by Claudia Seidel, Albrechtsburg, Meissen, 2010
- Lingering Whispers, curated by Predrag Pajdic and Claudia Seidel, Crypt of St Pancras Church, London, 2010
- Liebet!, Perfectprops, Vienna, 2010

== Awards ==
Joachim Baldauf and Printkultur have received numerous prizes and awards, including several International Art Directors Club Awards and Lead Awards, a Creative Club Austria Award, a Swiss Photo Award, Cover of the Year and a Distinctive Merit Award.

== Printkultur publications ==
- Vorn, issue no. 1, 244 pages, Printkultur (2004), limited edition
- Vorn, issue no. 2, 268 pages, Printkultur (2004), limited edition
- Vorn, issue no. 3, 252 pages, Printkultur (2006), limited edition
- Vorn, issue no. 4, 250 pages, Printkultur (2007), limited edition
- Vorn, issue no. 5, 250 pages, Printkultur (2008), limited edition
- Wendy Iles: A Book About Hair, 228 pages, Printkultur (2008), ISBN 978-3-00-023631-0
- Tina Berning: 100 Girls On Cheap Paper, 192 pages, Printkultur (2009), ISBN 978-0-8118-6719-1
- Christina Kruse: Reisetagebuch 1–5, 254 pages, Printkultur (2009), no ISBN
- Vorn, issue no. 6, 240 pages, Printkultur & Claudia Seidel (2010), limited edition
- Vorn, issue no. 7, 240 pages, Printkultur & Uta Grosenick (2014), ISBN 978-3-89955-532-5

== Publications ==
- Joachim Baldauf: Photographs + The Wallpaper* Years, 384 pages, Distanz Verlag (2013), ISBN 978-3-95476-009-1

With a conversation between Tyler Brûlé, founder and former editorial director of Wallpaper* and current editor-in-chief of Monocle, and Ariel Childs, former editor of photography at Wallpaper*; a text by Tillmann Prüfer, an editor at Die Zeit and style director at Zeit Magazin; and a foreword by Uta Grosenick, cofounder of Distanz Verlag.
