= Tony Spaeth =

American businessman (1934–2021)

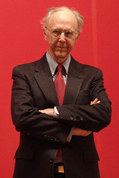
Tony Spaeth

Otto Lucien Anton Spaeth Jr. (February 6, 1934 – January 13, 2021), better known as Tony Spaeth, was an American corporate identity planner, consultant, critic and teacher. His work developed the premise that institutional branding systems are best understood as tools of leadership – tools to establish directional clarity, motivate performance, and affect structural change as well as to revitalize market presence:

"In preparing an imaginary consulting proposal, the author provides a practical, comprehensive overview of two major groups of identity issues: content - making sure the program is right; and execution - making sure the program is working. It is a thorough primer rich with examples and commentary on the nuances of decision making." (Tony Spaeth - Diagnosing Corporate Identities, Design Management Journal, 1991)

== Early years ==
Spaeth born in Saint Louis, Missouri on February 6, 1934. During his childhood, Spaeth's parents took in Anthony Bailey (then himself a child) as a war refugee; Bailey has since told the story of their shared childhood years in the books America, Lost & Found and England, First & Last.

== Later work ==
From a base in Rye, New York, since 1990 Spaeth has provided identity planning and creative counsel to scores of clients in diverse categories. He is credited with such corporate brands as Dow Jones, Eastman Chemical, Celera Genomics, Flowserve, Commonfund, FIRST Robotics and Outward Bound USA.

From 1998, on his website Identityworks.com - a service of Tony Spaeth / Identity (now discontinued), Spaeth reviewed noteworthy new identities of strategic or creative interest, with appropriate credit to chief executives and designers alike. The site also provided a variety of analytic and planning tools for branding and design students worldwide, and contained Identity Forum, where a global panel of leading thinkers and practitioners addressed identity issues.

Spaeth's annual rebrandings overview in The Conference Board Review magazine provided a significant record covering more than two decades of Corporate Identity change:

"Some corporate brands evolve. Others sicken—of neglect, or inertia, or fear of change—decline, and can ultimately die. And when an identity begins to sicken, its effect can be systemic, like gangrene. The symptoms are conflicted managers, confused customers, and demoralized employees. An identity review is called for. Obviously, rebrandings are almost never the whole cure. There are substantive medicines too—restructurings, reorganizations, even new leaders—and more often than not, the rebranding event merely plays catch-up, expressing such substantive changes in hope that public image (and market valuation) will keep pace with them." (Tony Spaeth - Brand Evolution - The Conference Board, 2009)

"A downturn can represent an opportune time to rebrand. In a time of turmoil, companies find themselves rethinking their customer base, their lines of business, their very identity. Some retreat to focus on their core competencies; others look to expand by snapping up troubled competitors. You’d think more would publicize their shifts with new logos and identities, particularly when newspapers and TV stations are practically giving away ad pages and commercial slots. And indeed, some companies did launch rebrandings in 2009. Several are worth studying for their strategic interest, excellent execution, and perhaps for their courage. But for my friends in the identity business—and also, I would argue, for a fluid and dynamic economy—the less-good news is that these brave companies are the exceptions. Nobody is keeping score, but far fewer companies appear to have rebranded in 2009 than in any of the post-2001 recession years, which themselves were sharply down from the “brand is hot” 1990s." (Tony Spaeth - The Identity Recession - The Conference Board, 2010)

== Death ==
Spaeth died at his home in Rye, New York, on January 13, 2021, at the age of 86.
