= Ludwig Späth =

German botanist and nurseryman

Ludwig Späth (1793–1883) was a German botanist and nurseryman. He was father of Franz Ludwig Späth.

The Common Lilac cultivar 'Andenken an Ludwig Späth' (French: 'Souvenir de Louis Spaeth') (Syringa vulgaris 'Souvenir de Louis Spaeth') was named in his honour.
