= Franz Ludwig Späth =

German botanist (1839–1913)

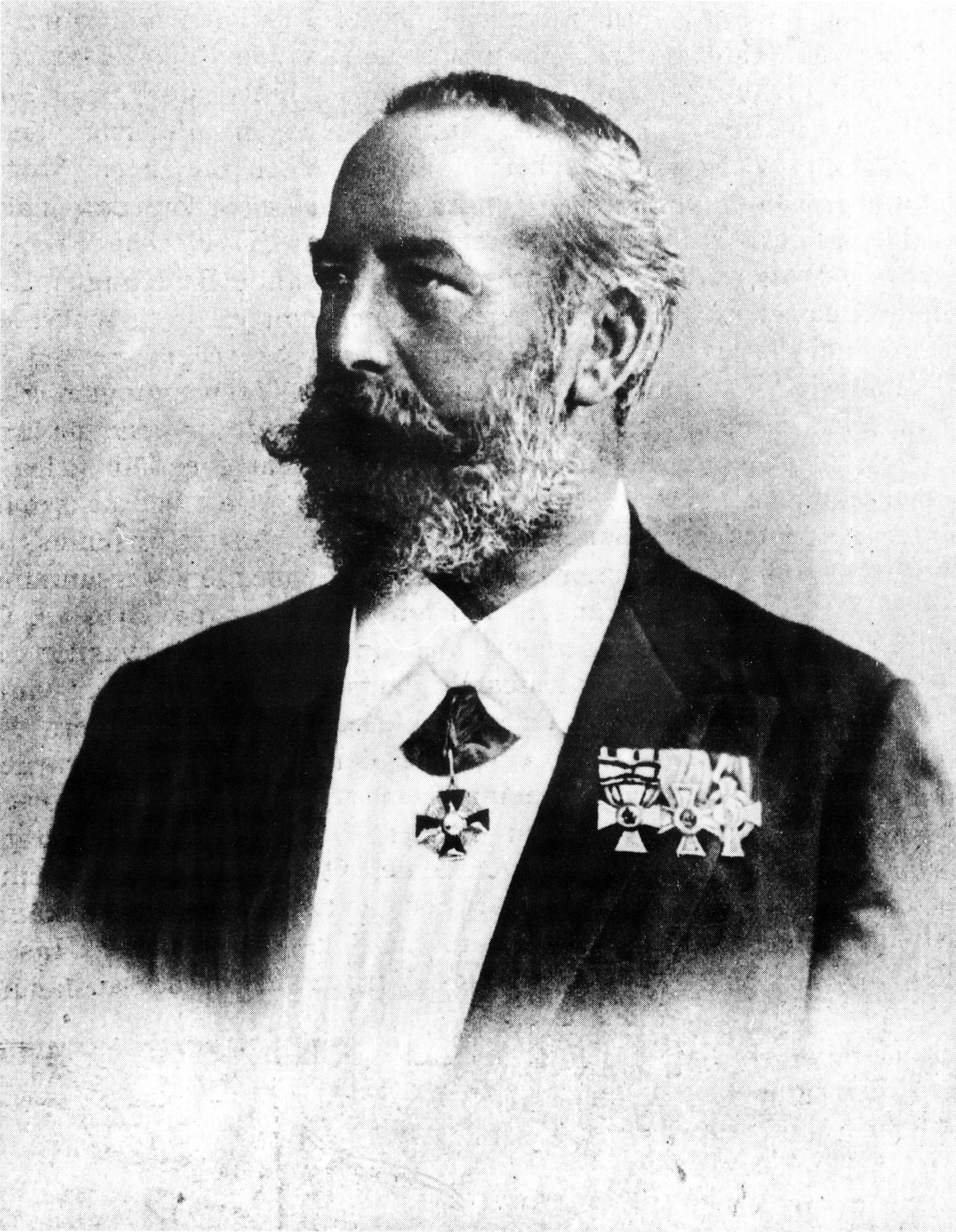
Franz Ludwig Späth, 1899

Franz Ludwig Späth (25 February 1839 – 2 February 1913), was a German botanist and fifth manager of the Späth nursery from 1863, when his father Ludwig Späth (1793–1883) retired, until his death, when the nursery passed to his own son Hellmut Ludwig Späth (1885–1945). With his father Ludwig, Franz was a co-founder of the German Pomologists Association in 1860, and was made an honorary member in 1903.
