= Späth nursery =

Plant nursery in Berlin, Germany

Coordinates: 52.4543°N 13.4734°E

The Späth (often spelt Spaeth) family created one of the world's most notable plant nurseries of the 19th and early 20th centuries. The nursery had been founded in 1720 by Christoph Späth but removed to the erstwhile district of Baumschulenweg (lit. 'nursery way'; now part of the Treptow-Köpenick district) in south-east Berlin in 1863 when Franz Ludwig Späth (1839 - 1913) succeeded his father Ludwig as manager when aged only 25. By the end of the 19th century, the nursery was the largest in the world, occupying 120 hectares. In 1874 Franz built a mansion on the site, now part of Humboldt University and, five years later, established an arboretum.

After his death in Britz in 1913, Franz Späth was succeeded by his son, Hellmut, who revived the nursery's flagging fortunes during the Depression by joining the Nazi Party and securing lucrative landscaping contracts for the new autobahns and other public works. However, his outspoken criticism of the Nazi regime saw him incarcerated in Sachsenhausen concentration camp where he was executed in 1945. The nursery had closed the year before, and in 1947 the arboretum passed into public ownership becoming known as the Späthsches Arboretum.

== Owners / proprietors of the Späth nursery, 1720 - 1944 ==
- Christoph Späth (1696–1746)
- Carl Späth (1721–1782)
- Frederick Späth (1768–1831)
- Ludwig Späth (1793–1883)
- Franz Späth (1839–1913)
- Hellmut Späth (1885–1945)
