= Ulmus pumila 'Pinnato-ramosa' =

Elm cultivar

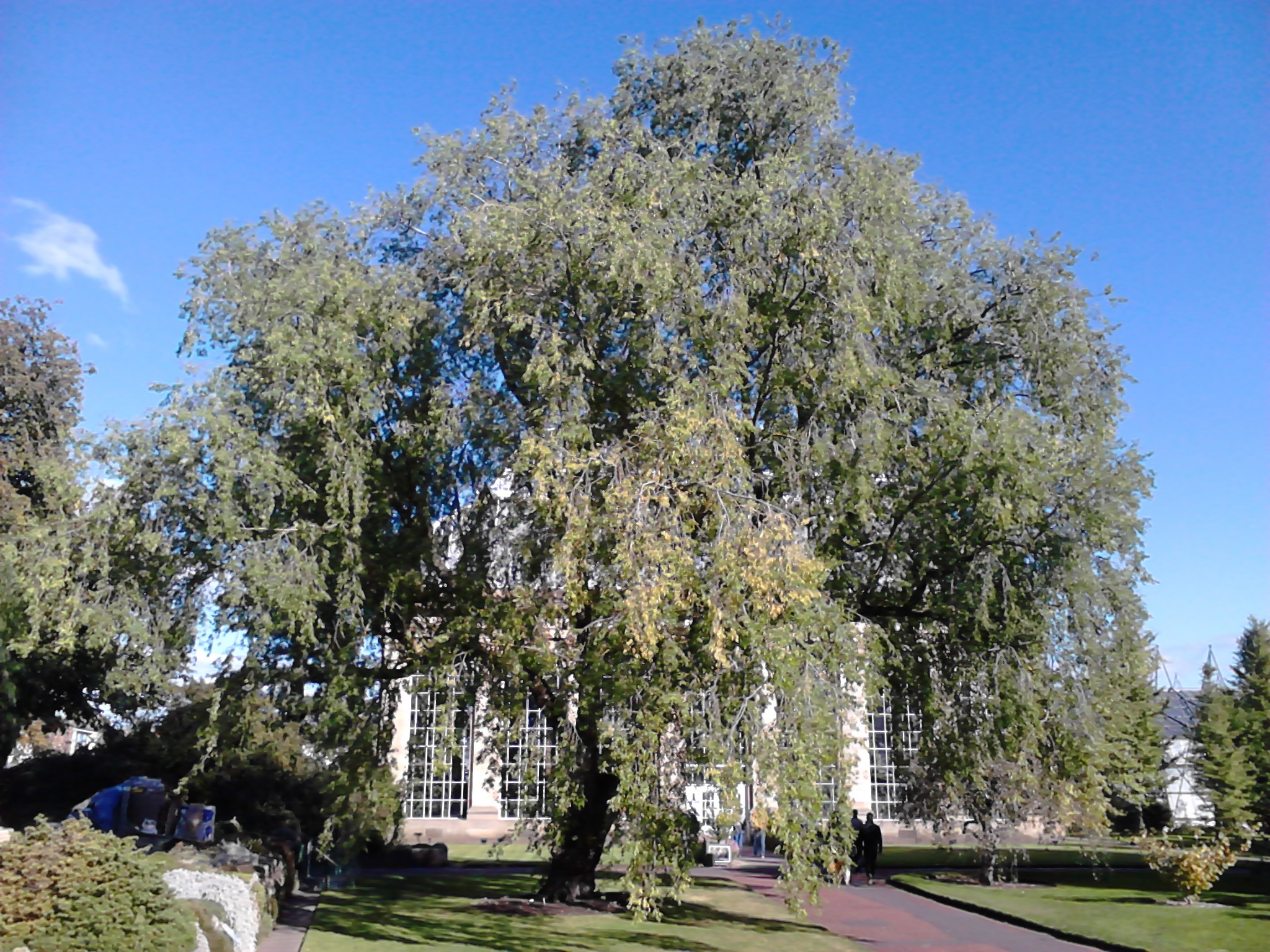
- 'Pinnato-ramosa', Royal Botanic Garden Edinburgh, planted 1902
- Species: Ulmus pumila
- Cultivar: 'Pinnato-ramosa'
- Origin: Germany

The Siberian elm cultivar Ulmus pumila 'Pinnato-ramosa' was raised by Georg Dieck, as Ulmus pinnato-ramosa, at the National Arboretum, Zöschen, Germany, from seed collected for him circa 1890 in the Ili valley, Turkestan (then a region of the Russian Empire, now part of Kazakhstan) by the lawyer and amateur naturalist Vladislav E. Niedzwiecki while in exile there. Litvinov (1908) treated it as a variety of Siberian elm, U. pumila var. arborea but this taxon was ultimately rejected by Green, who sank the tree as a cultivar: "in modern terms, it does not warrant recognition at this rank but is a variant of U. pumila maintained and known only in cultivation, and therefore best treated as a cultivar". Herbarium specimens confirm that trees in cultivation in the 20th century as U. pumila L. var. arborea Litv. were no different from 'Pinnato-ramosa' (see 'External links').

'Pinnato-ramosa' is one of a number of elms that have at various times been called 'Turkestan Elm'. That name has also been applied to dense-branched Central Asian elms like U. densa and 'Androssowii', to U. turkestanica Regel (which Elwes and Henry confused with 'Pinnato-ramosa' in their Synonymy list but which Regel himself had regarded as a form of field elm), and to U. minor 'Umbraculifera' (which Green considered synonymous with Ulmus turkestanica Regel, naming it U. 'Turkestanica'). The Späth nursery of Berlin, Kew Gardens, and the Arboretum national des Barres treated U. turkestanica Regel as a cultivar distinct from U. pinnato-ramosa and 'Umbraculifera'.

== Description ==
'Pinnato-ramosa' grows very vigorously, and can ultimately make a large tree, however it also has a straggling, untidy habit, producing long shoots 0.60–0.95 m in length. Dieck also described the unusual arrangement of the branch and shoots: 'The branches are organized in a way that each offshoot lies in the same plane as the main branch or stem, like the quill and filaments of a bird feather'. The cultivar name derives from this pinnate-branched appearance. The tree is chiefly distinguished from U. pumila by its greater height and more slender leaves. The leaves, which have pinnate venation, are 4–7 cm in length, ovate-lanceolate, with double-toothed margins, and finely pointed.

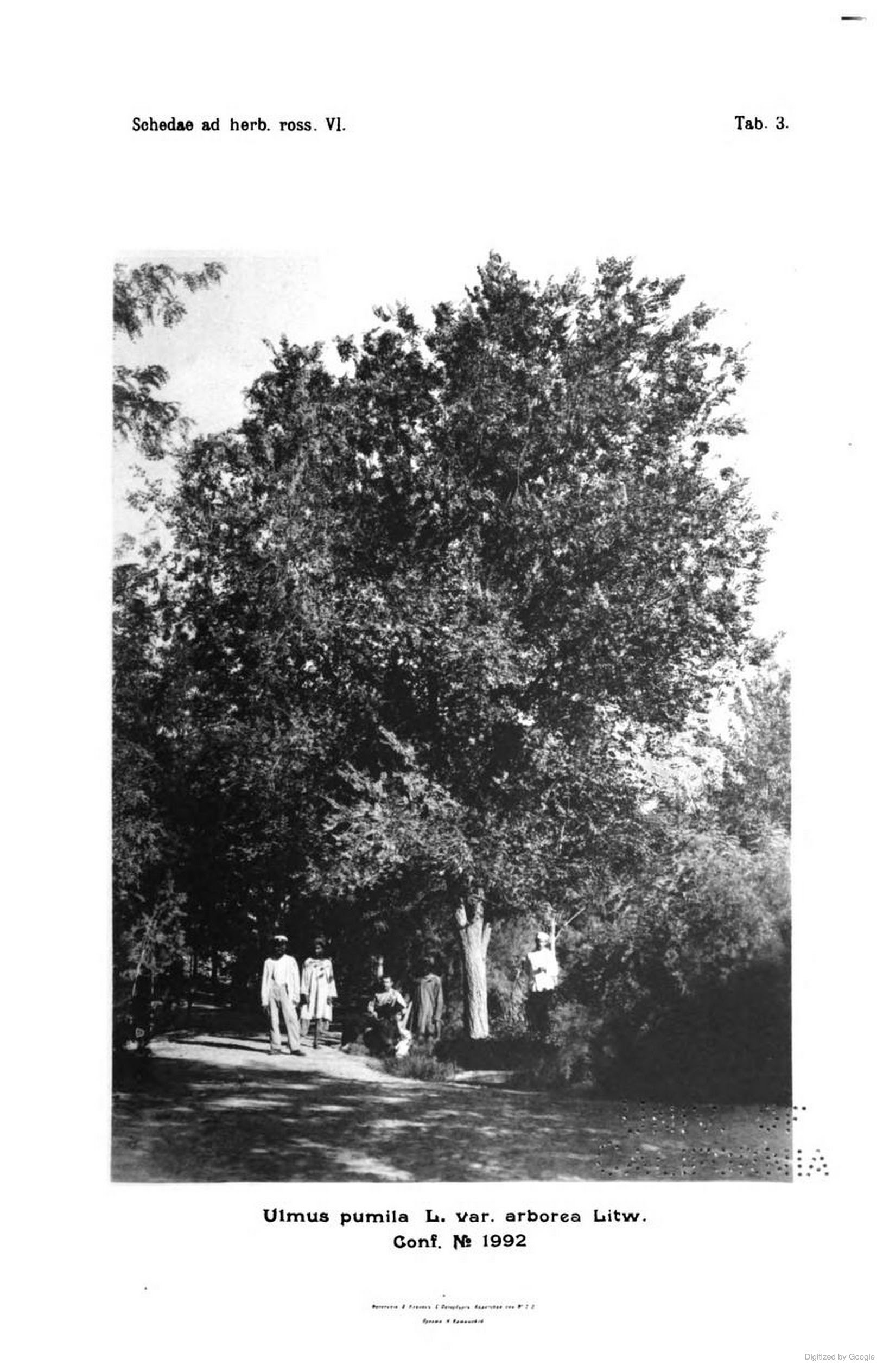
U. pumila var. arborea

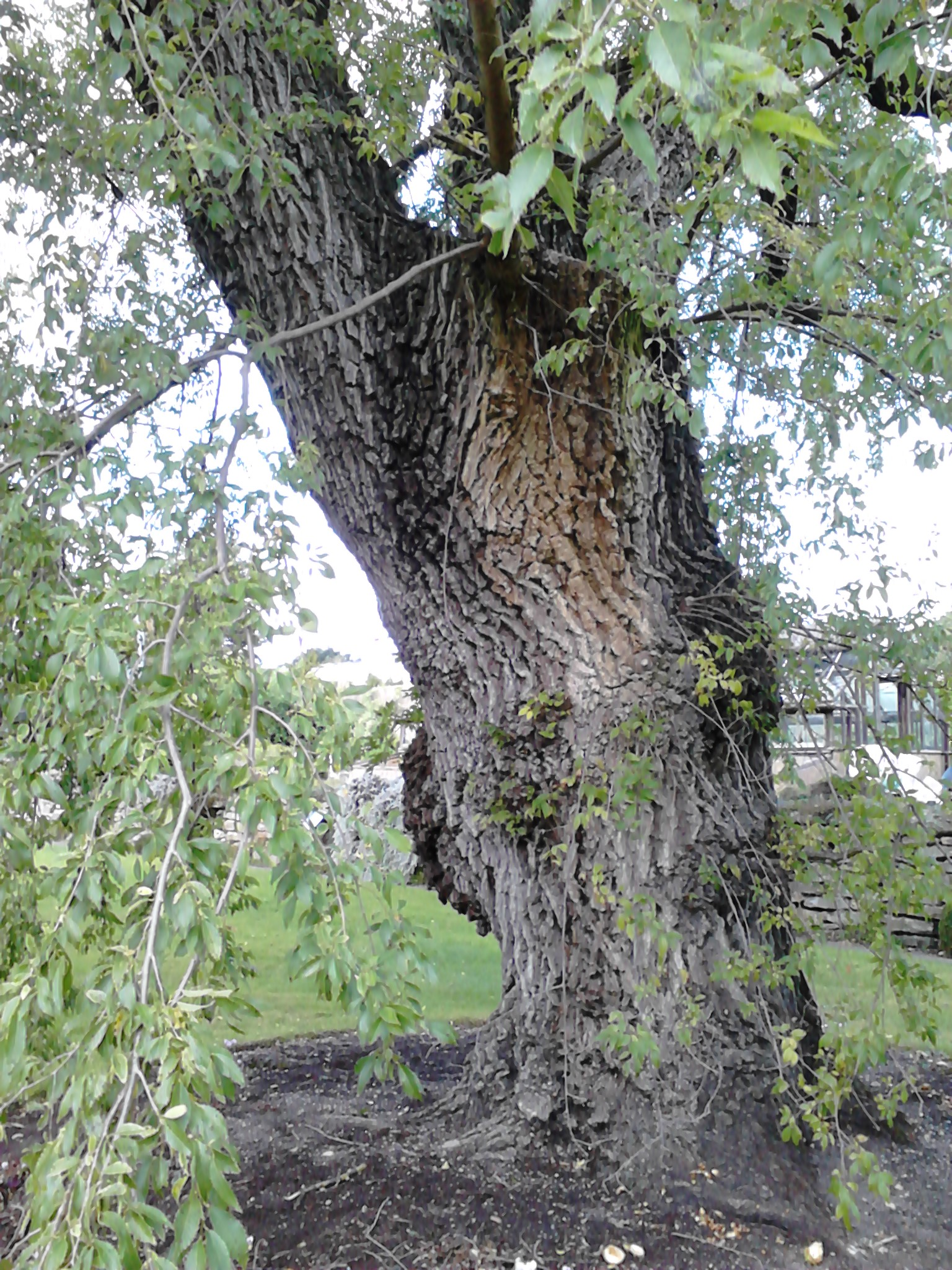
Bole of RBGE tree

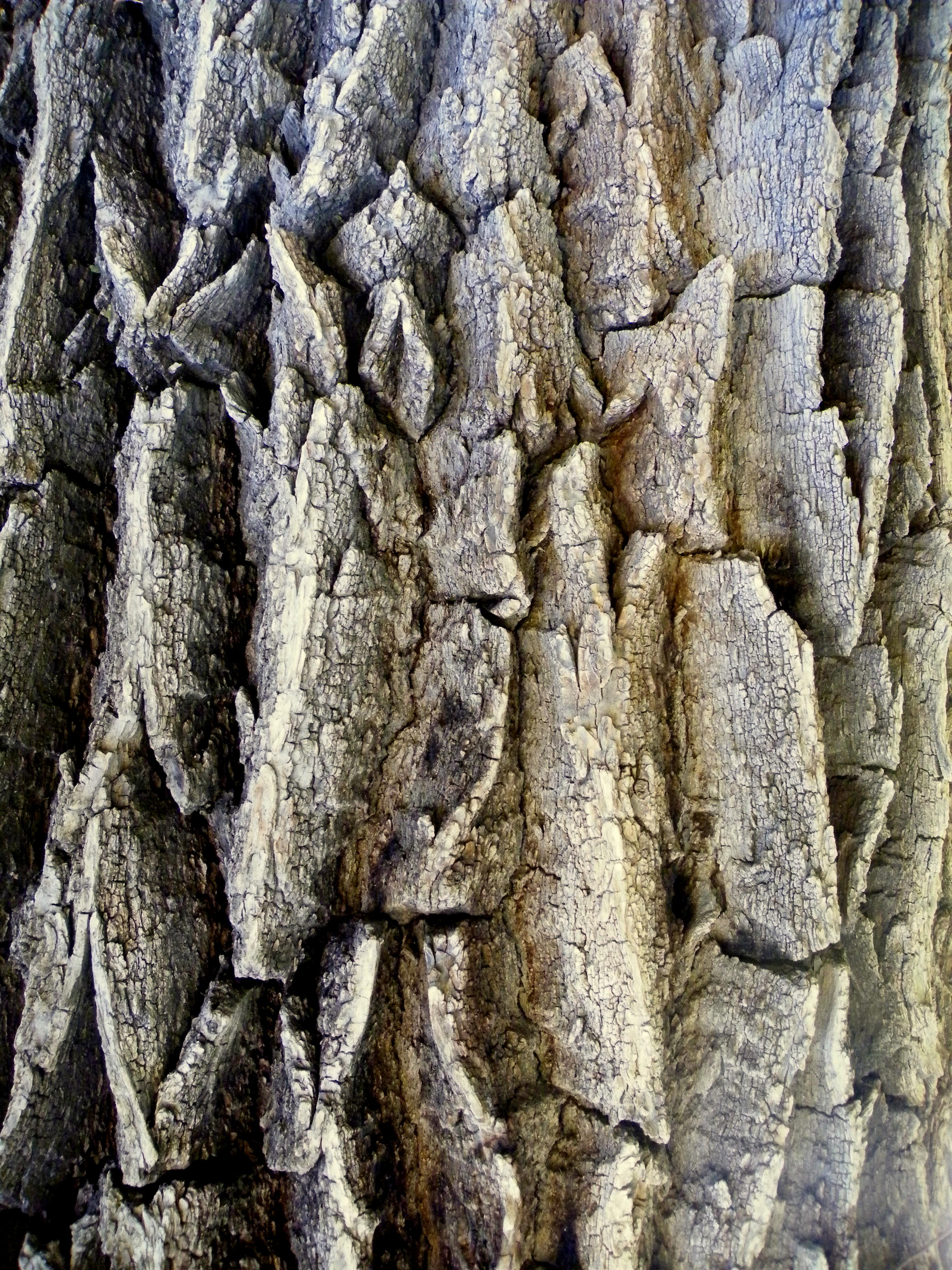
Bark of specimen in University of Belgrade Botanical Garden

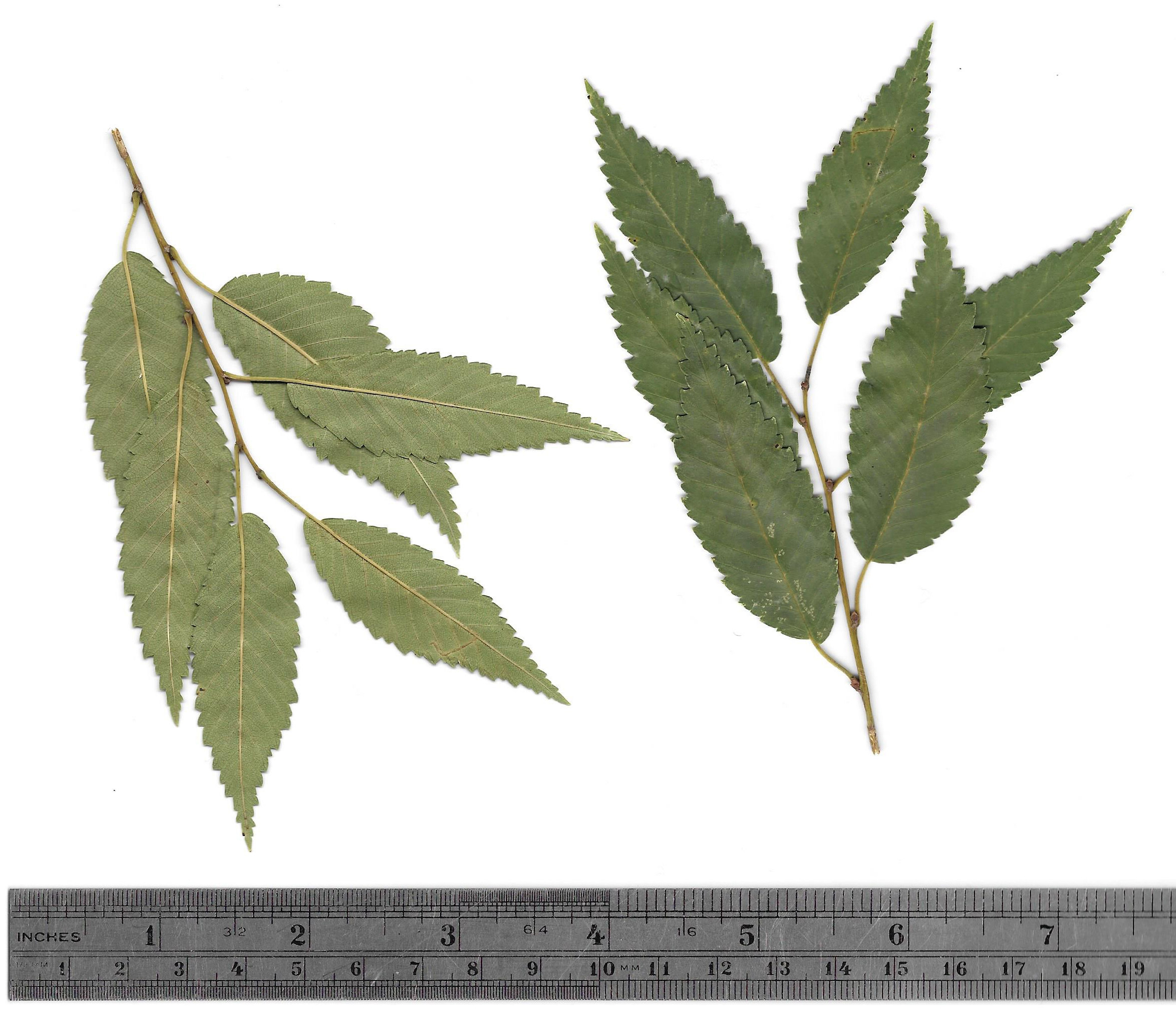
Dried leaves from 'Pinnato-ramosa', Edinburgh

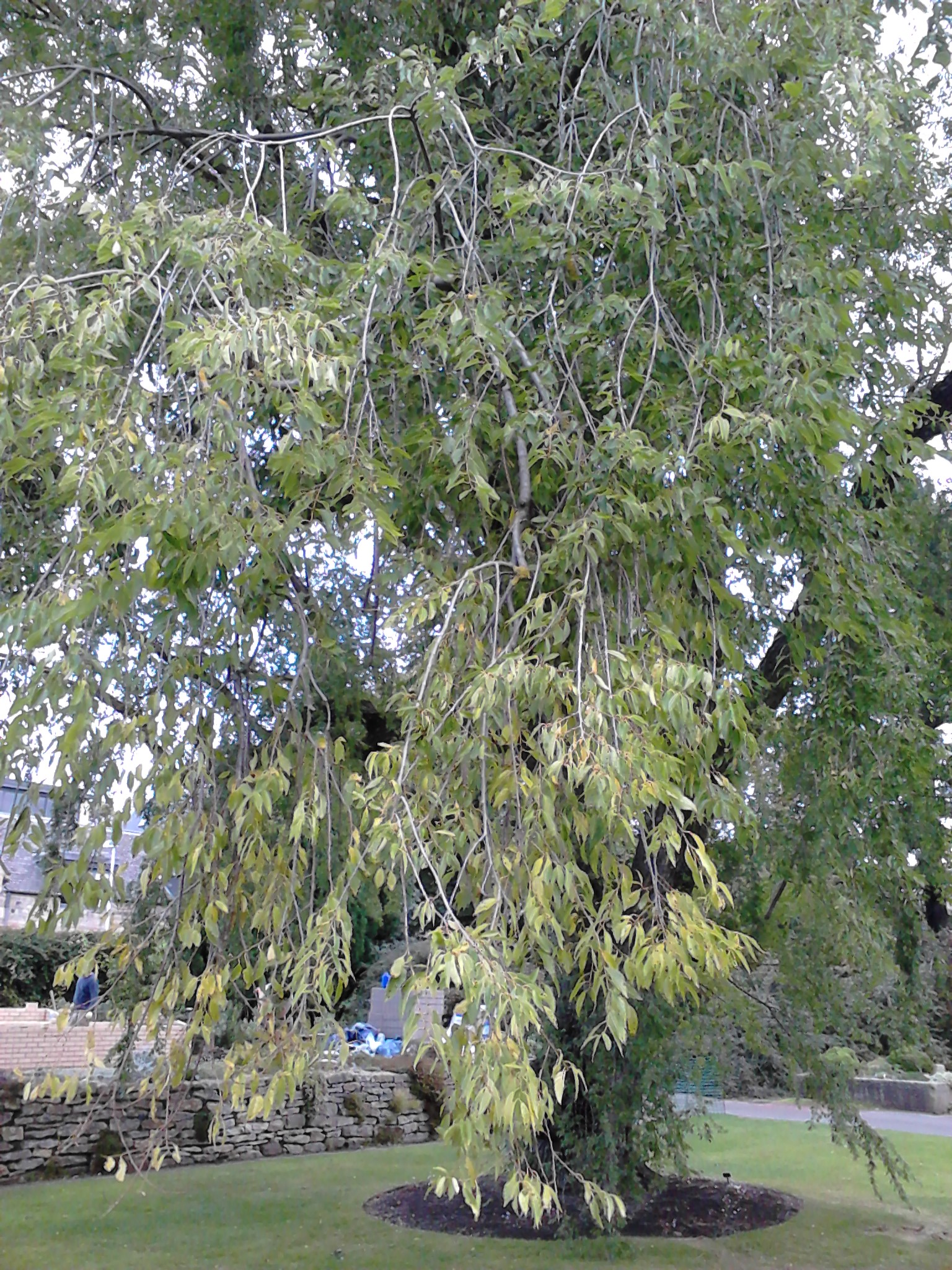
Long shoots of 'Pinnato-ramosa'

== Pests and diseases ==
Though resistant to the earlier strain of Dutch elm disease (DED), 'Pinnato-ramosa' has not been scientifically tested for resistance to the later strain. Several old specimens have survived unscathed by the disease (see 'Notable trees').

== Cultivation ==
Dieck gave several specimens to the Späth nursery, which exported the tree across Europe, and to the USA. A specimen from Späth, incorrectly listed as Ulmus pinnato-racemosa, was planted at the Dominion Arboretum, Ottawa, Canada, in 1898. Some of these trees still survive, notably in the UK, and North America. Clibrans' nursery of Altrincham, Cheshire, supplied the tree in the UK in the early 20th century; the tree was later propagated and marketed by the Hillier & Sons nursery, Winchester, Hampshire from 1949, with 48 sold in the period 1962 to 1977, when production ceased.

Landowners in Italy in the 1930s were advised to plant 'Pinnato-ramosa' to replace native elms lost to the earlier strain of Dutch elm disease. Introduced to Croatia from Italy, 'Pinnato-ramosa' can now be found in many places along the Croatian littoral, where it is known as 'Turkestan Elm'. An Ulmus turkestanica (listed separately from 'Umbraculifera'), "a compact grower with smallish leaves", appeared in early 20th-century catalogues of the Gembrook or Nobelius Nursery near Melbourne, Australia. 'Pinnato-ramosa' is a rather loosely-branched tree, so the Nobelius introduction may have been Ulmus turkestanica Regel rather than the Siberian elm cultivar.

By the 1930s, when 'Pinnato-ramosa' was being recommended as resistant to early-strain DED, the "Turkestan elm" in nursery lists, as descriptions show, was usually this cultivar, not U. turkestanica Regel. The Hesse Nursery of Weener, Germany, sold an "Ulmus turkestanica Reg." in this decade, but gave U. pumila arborea Litv. as a synonym.

The tree was included in the early stages of the Dutch elm breeding programme, but was dropped owing to the susceptibility of its flowers, which emerge in early February, to frost. A specimen was planted in 2015 in the Mierenbos, Wageningen.

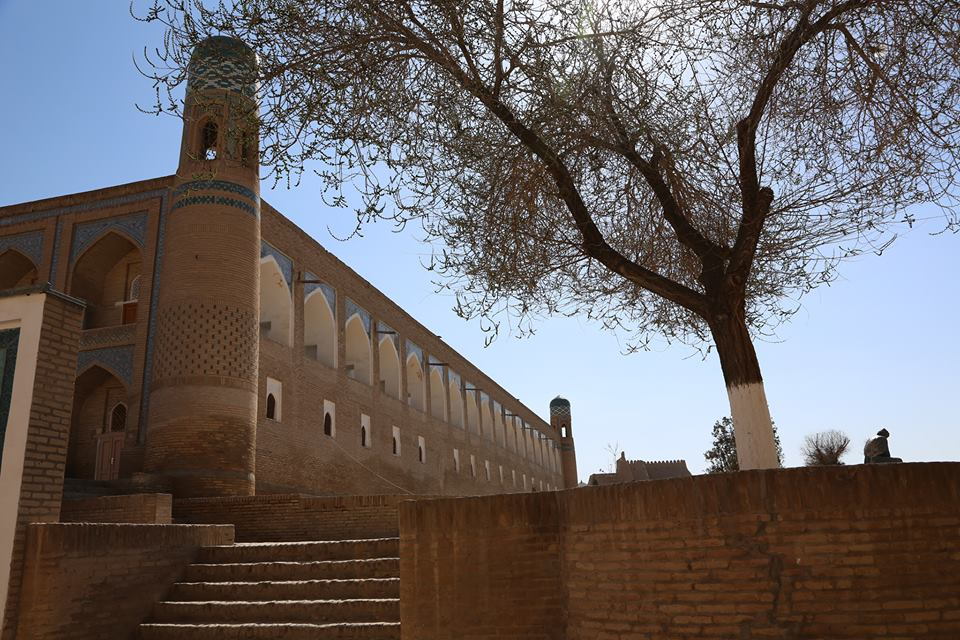
Pruned Ulmus pumila var. arborea, Khiva, Uzbekistan (2016)

== Notable trees ==
In the UK, one of three trees labelled Ulmus pinnato-ramosa obtained from Späth in 1902 by the Royal Botanic Garden Edinburgh survives (2020), measuring 15 m height × 82 cm d.b.h. in 2004. Though its U. pumila identity is not in doubt, the tree itself bears the non-specific label Ulmus 'Pinnato-ramosa' (2020). A specimen at Mote Park in Kent measured 20 m × 80 cm in 2009. Across the Atlantic, a probable 'Pinnato-ramosa' grows in the grounds of the Gillett-Beer Farm, Chicago Road, Warren, a suburb within the Detroit Metropolitan Area; the tree was 45 m tall, with a d.b.h. of 155 cm in 2012.

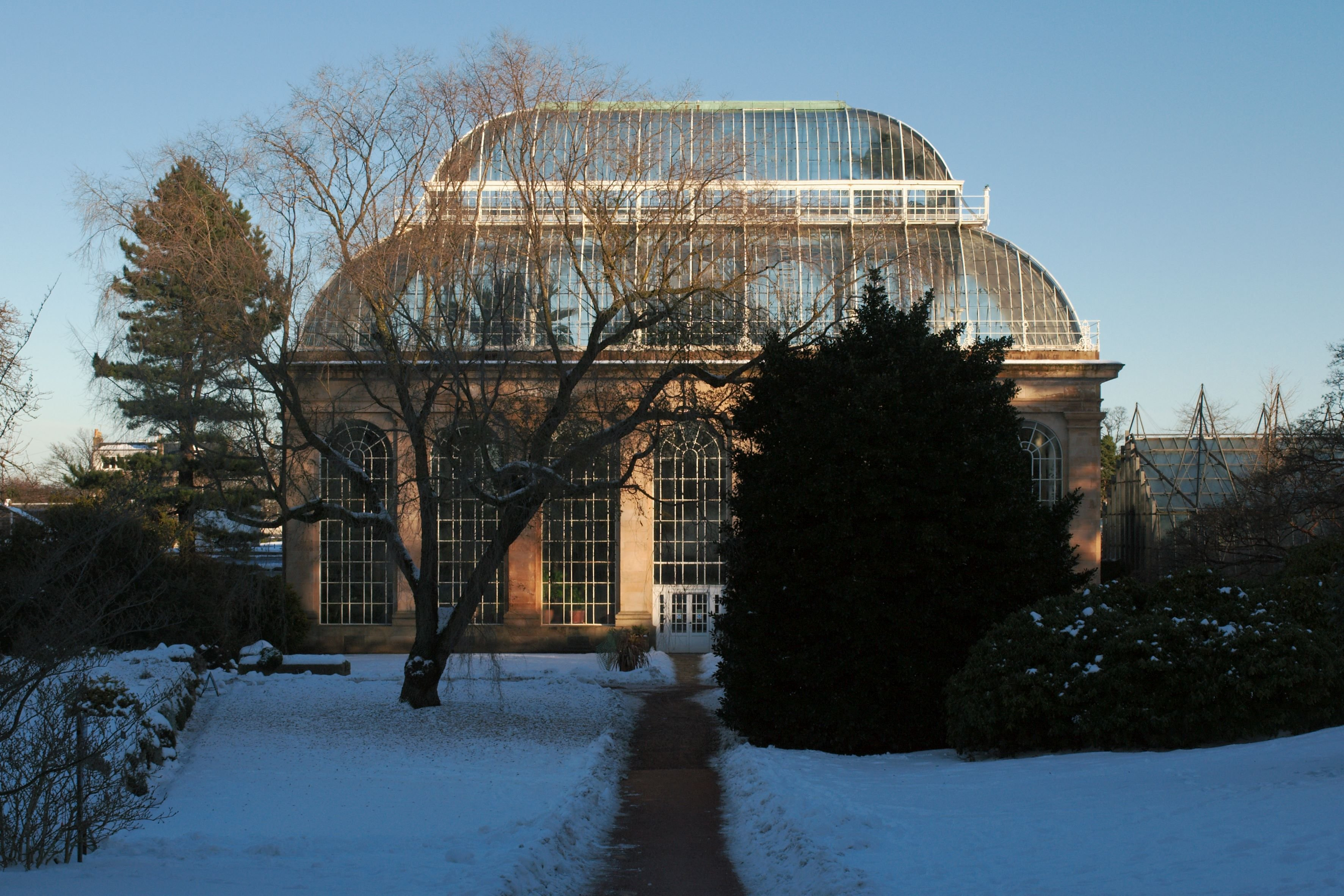
Winter silhouette of RBGE 'Pinnato-ramosa'

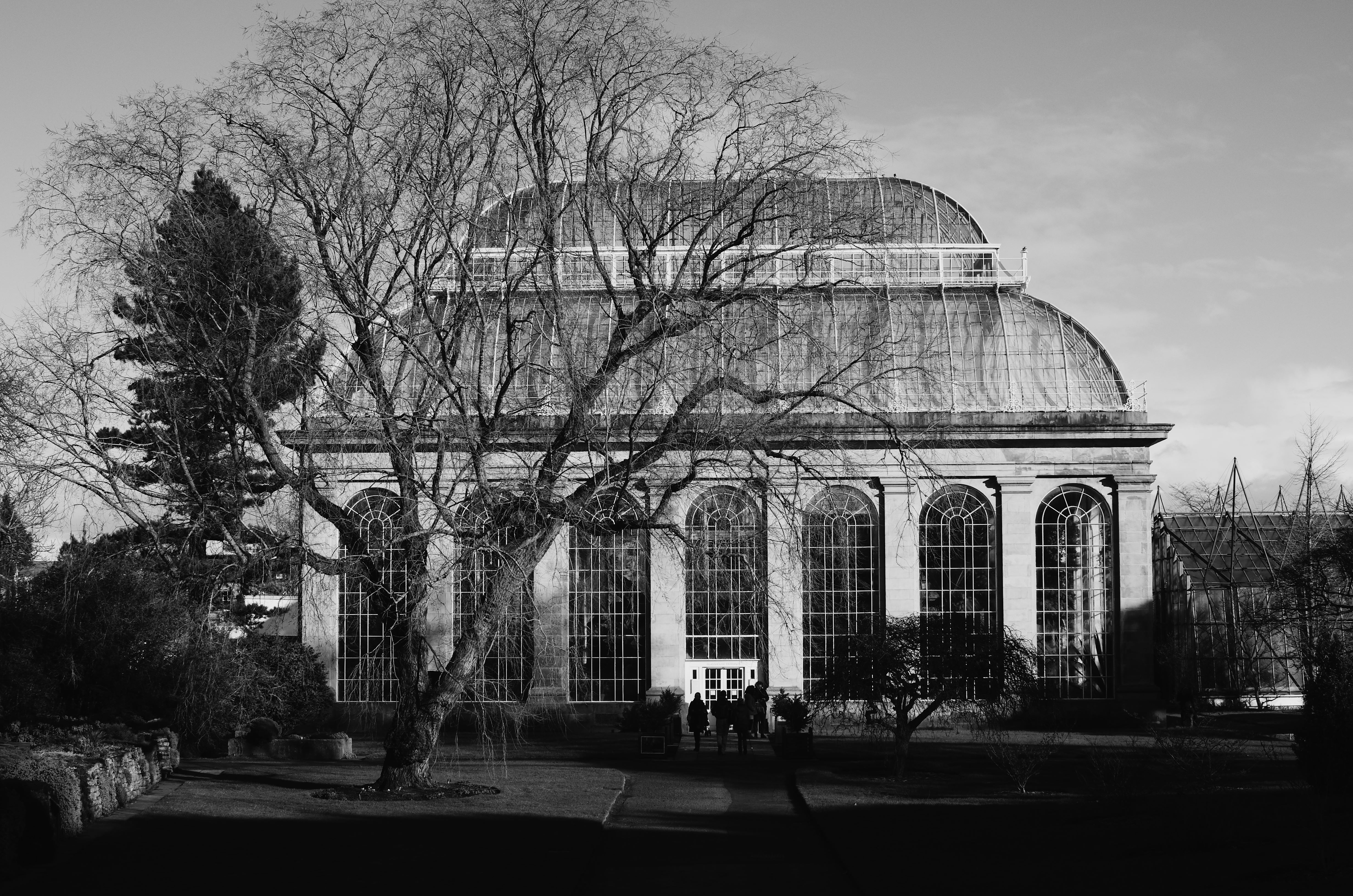
'Pinnato-ramosa' in flower, RBGE

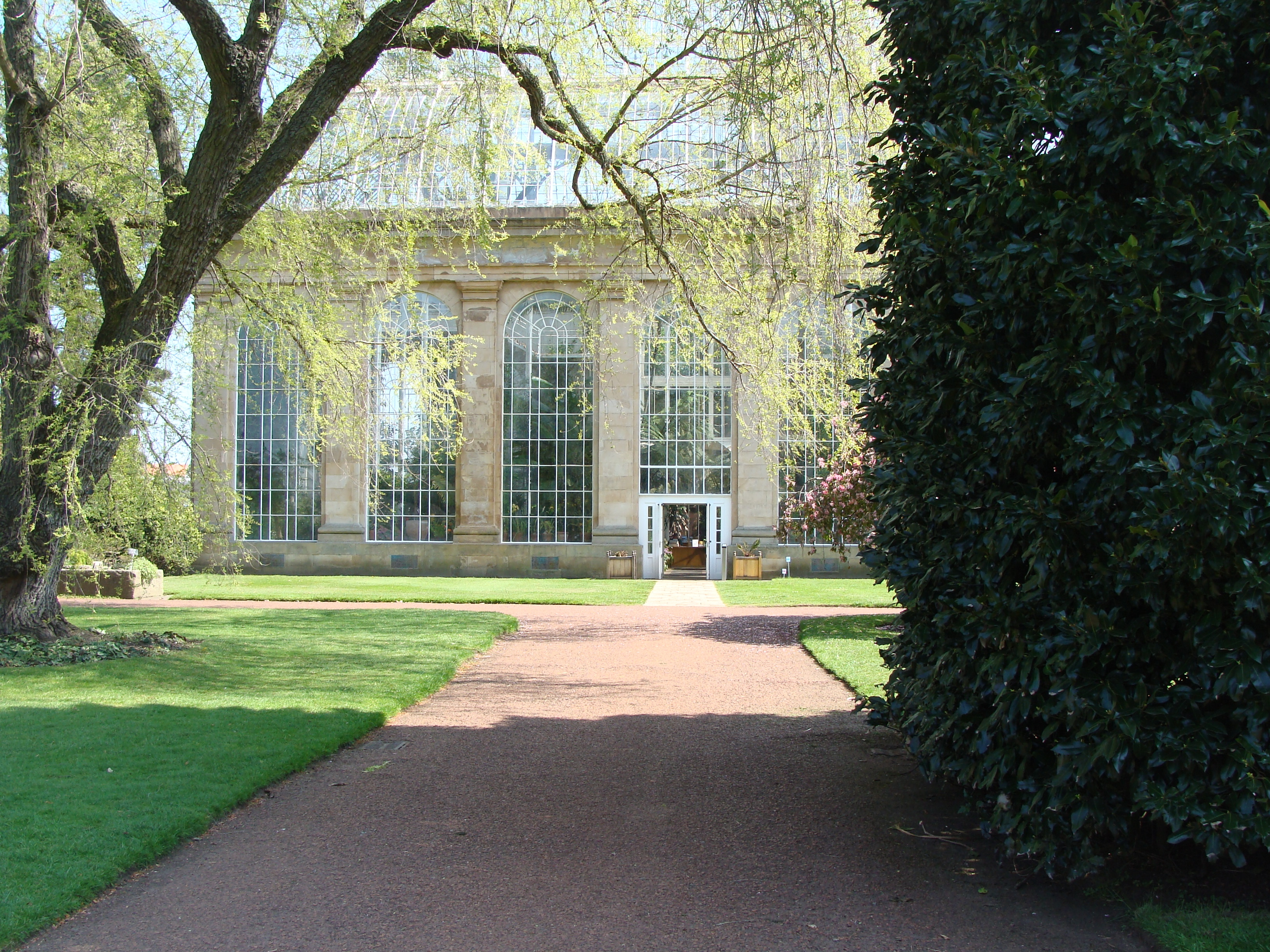
Emerging leaves of 'Pinnato-ramosa', RBGE

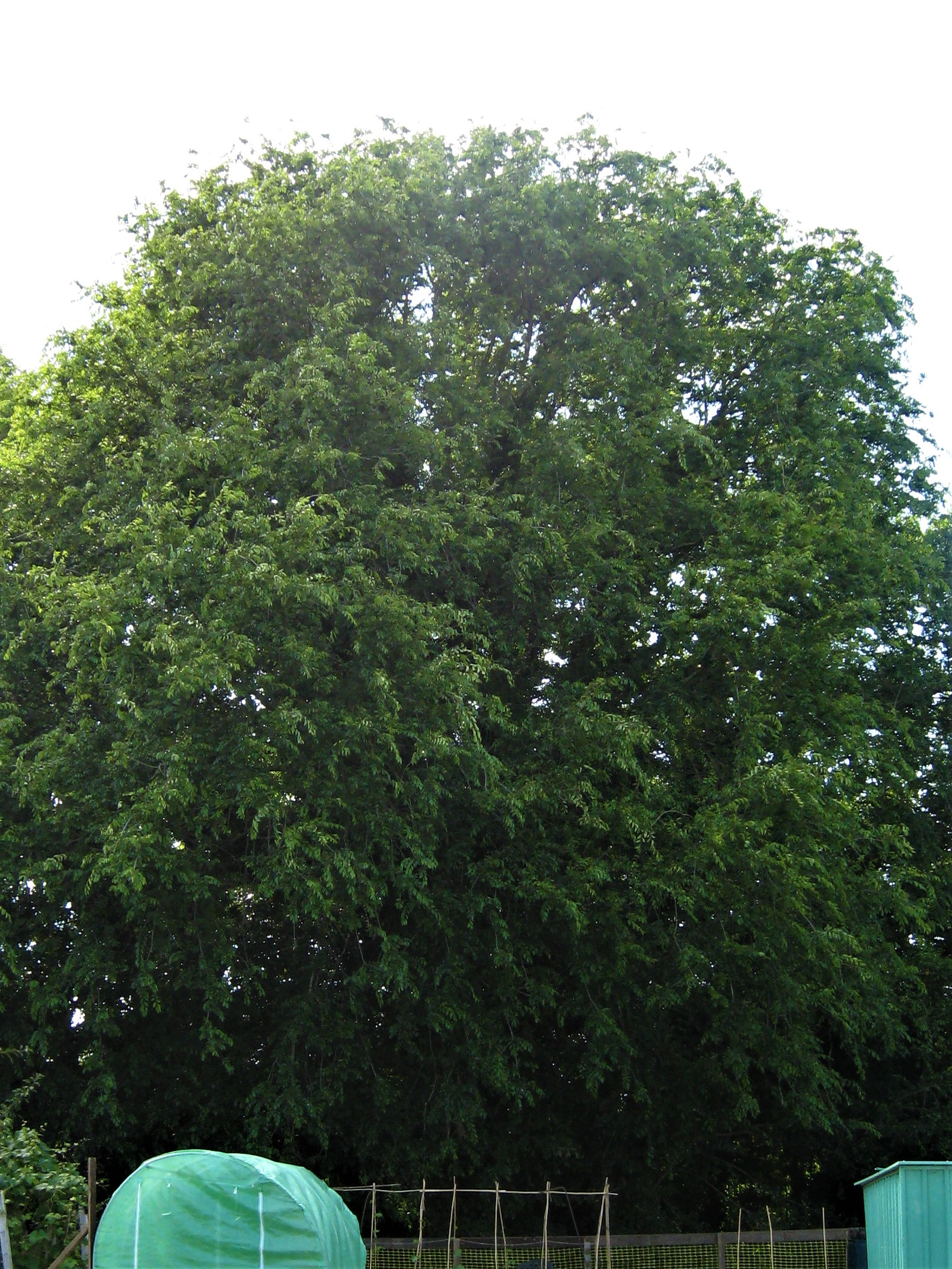
'Pinnato-ramosa', Portsmouth, UK. 20m height, bole 3.33m girth

== Synonymy ==
- U. pumila var. pinnato-ramosa
- U. pumila var. arborea

== Accessions ==
North America

- Arnold Arboretum, US. Acc. nos. 925–83, 698–87.
- Holden Arboretum, US. Acc. no. 60–317
- New York Botanical Garden, US. Acc. no. 1032/60

Europe

- Brighton & Hove City Council, UK. National Elm Collection. Full accession details unknown.
- Darmstadt University of Technology Botanic Garden, Darmstadt, Germany. Some accession details available
- Grange Farm Arboretum, Sutton St James, Spalding, Lincolnshire, UK. As U. pinnato-ramosa. Acc. no. 1088.
- Hergest Croft Gardens , Kington, Herefordshire, UK. One tree, as U. pinnato-ramosa; no accession details available.
- Royal Botanic Garden Edinburgh, UK. As U. pinnato-ramosa. Acc. no. 19021006. (2021 cloned sapling as U. pumila 'Pinnato-ramosa'; same acc. no.)
- Sir Harold Hillier Gardens, Ampfield, UK. Acc. no. 1977.4795 (LM200), Acc. no. 1986.2511 (LM600)
- Späth-Arboretum, Berlin, Germany. Acc. no 02-009.
- Strona Arboretum, University of Life Sciences, Warsaw, Poland. Acc. details not known
- University of Copenhagen Botanic Garden, Denmark. No details available.
- University of Ulm Botanic Garden, Ulm, Germany. Some accession details available

== Hybrid cultivars ==
- Den Haag ('Pinnato-ramosa' × Ulmus × hollandica 'Belgica'), raised in the Netherlands in 1936.
