= Ulmus 'Turkestanica' =

Elm cultivar

- Genus: Ulmus
- Cultivar: 'Turkestanica'
- Origin: Turkestan

The elm cultivar Ulmus 'Turkestanica' was first described by Regel as U. turkestanica in Dieck, Hauptcat. Baumschul. Zöschen (1883) and in Gartenflora (1884). Regel himself stressed that "U. turkestanica was only a preliminary name given by me; I regard this as a form of U. suberosa" [:U. minor ]. Litvinov (Schedae ad Herbarium Florae Rossicae, 1908) considered U. turkestanica Regel a variety of his U. densa (now considered in Russia a form of field elm), adding that its fruits were "like those of U. foliacea Gilibert" [:U. minor].

'Turkestanica' was distributed in Europe as U. turkestanica Regel by the Späth nursery of Berlin from c.1890, in whose catalogues it was listed separately from U. pinnato-ramosa, now U. pumila 'Pinnato-ramosa', and from U. campestris umbraculifera. It was later confused with these two – with 'Pinnato-ramosa' by Elwes and Henry (1913) and Krüssmann (1976), and with 'Umbraculifera' by Green (1964).

== Description ==
Späth in his catalogues described U. turkestanica Regel as "a densely growing, small-leaved tree". Litvinov (1908) noted that it had branchlets like those of Ulmus pumila but typical field-elm fruit, up to 2 cm long by 1.2 cm wide. Melville noted (1958) that the specimen of U. turkestanica at Kew had "frond-like leading shoots".

== Pests and diseases ==
Not known.

== Cultivation ==
One tree was planted as U. turkestanica Regel, 'Turkestan Elm', in 1899 at the Dominion Arboretum, Ottawa, Canada, where it was distinguished from U. pinnato-ramosa. A specimen of U. turkestanica Regel was present at Kew from the early 20th century to at least the 1950s, again distinguished from U. pinnato-ramosa. Three U. turkestanica Regel (as well as three 'Pinnato-ramosa') were supplied in 1902 by Späth to the Royal Botanic Garden Edinburgh. One was planted at the Benmore garden in Argyll in 1902, and survived till 2022 as a sucker or cutting of the original. Following Green's confusion of 'Turkestanica' and 'Umbraculifera', the Benmore tree was believed for a time to be 'Umbraculifera'. 'Umbraculifera', however, though present in Späth's catalogues, does not appear in the RBGE 1902 accessions list from Späth. Being grafted, it does not sucker. In 2004 the tree was again misidentified by the Garden as U. pumila L. var. arborea Litv. (a synonym of 'Pinnato-ramosa'), though the leaves do not match those of the latter cultivar. An U. turkestanica stood till 1993 in RBGE itself, near the U. pinnato-ramosa. This was also a small tree; it produced suckers, and may itself have been sucker regrowth from tree C2697, one of the 1902 'Turkestanica' Regel from Späth. A specimen of 'Turkestanica' Regel stood in the Arboretum national des Barres, Nogent-sur-Vernisson, France, in the 20th century, where it was distinguished from 'Pinnato-ramosa'. It was listed there under the queried synonym of Ulmus campestris turkestanica, suggesting that the Arboretum thought it possibly a field elm cultivar.

A 'Turkestanica' obtained from Späth before 1914, and planted in 1916, stood in the Ryston Hall arboretum, Norfolk, in the early 20th century. (The arboretum's list also includes 'Umbraculifera' but not 'Pinnato-ramosa'.) A 'Turkestanica' (listed separately from 'Umbraculifera'), "a compact grower with smallish leaves", appeared in early 20th-century catalogues of the Gembrook or Nobelius Nursery near Melbourne, Australia. The description is the one used by Späth for U. turkestanica Regel. 'Pinnato-ramosa' (not in the Nobelius catalogue) is, by contrast, a rather loosely-branched tree, so the Nobelius introduction may have been Regel's tree.

By the 1930s, when 'Pinnato-ramosa' was being recommended as resistant to early-strain Dutch elm disease, the "Turkestan elm" in nursery lists, as descriptions show, was usually this Siberian elm cultivar, not Regel's field elm. A 1929 Dutch herbarium specimen renames Regel's clone "Unknown Ulmus, formerly known as U. turkestanica", reflecting this change in nomenclature. The Hesse Nursery of Weener, Germany, sold an "Ulmus turkestanica Reg." in the 1930s, but gave as a synonym U. pumila arborea Litv., another name for 'Pinnato-ramosa', confirming that their tree was not Regel's field elm clone.

=== Putative specimens ===
A tall suckering field elm with leaves matching those of the Benmore specimen, and with the "frond-like leading shoots" described by Melville, stands in Carlton Terrace Gardens, Edinburgh, above Carlton Terrace Brae.

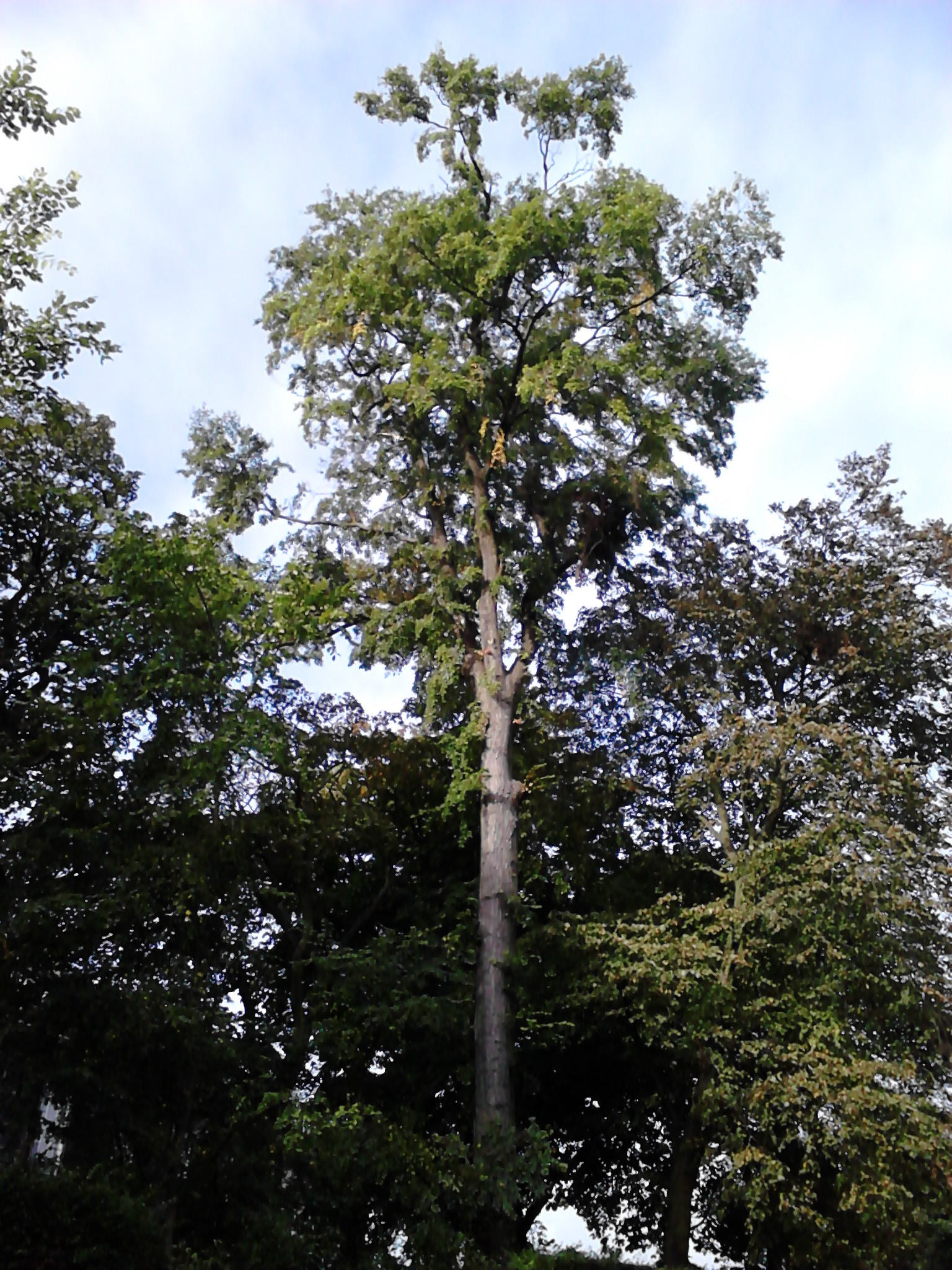
Possible 'Turkestanica', Edinburgh (2016)

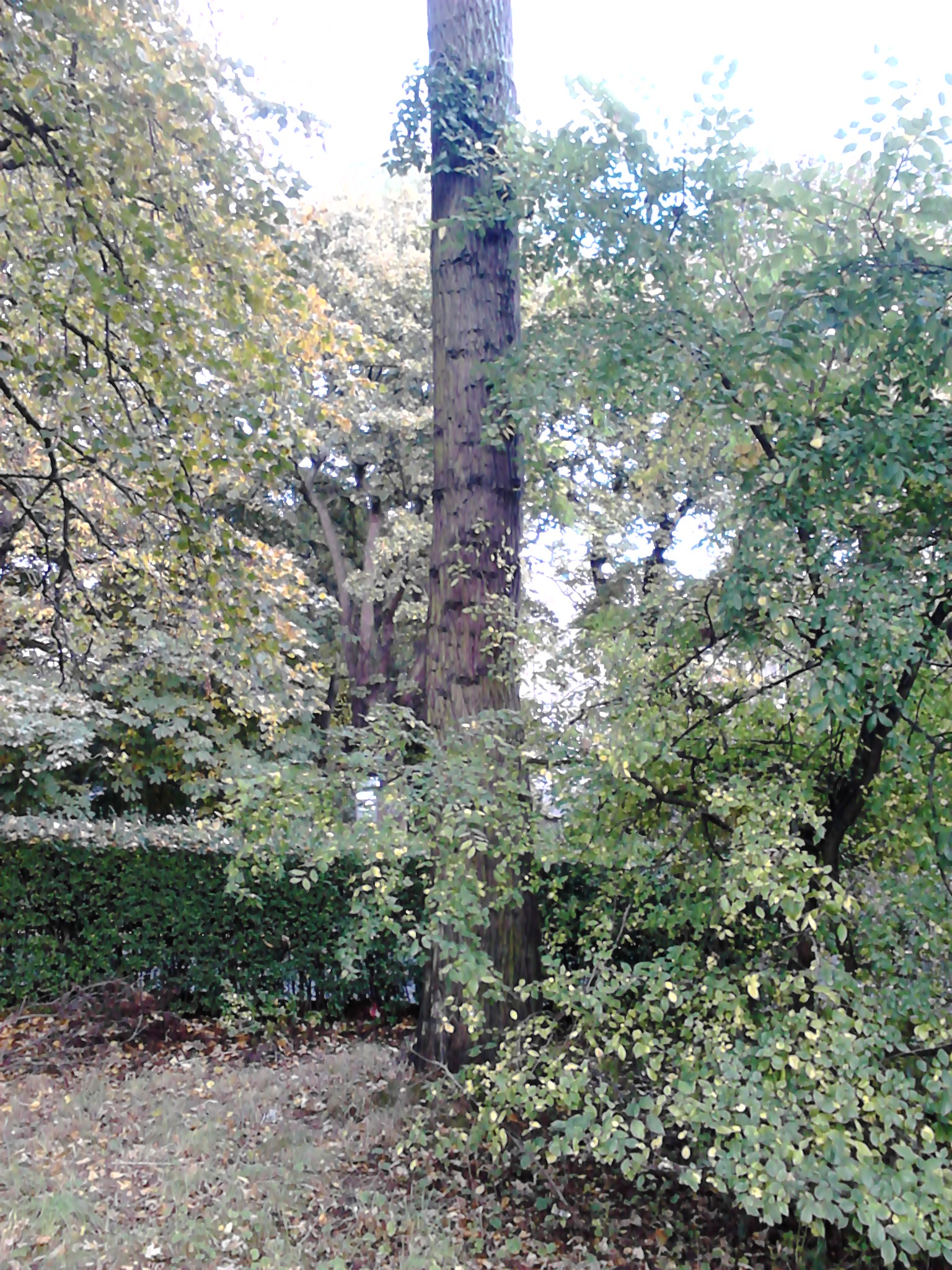
Bole and suckers

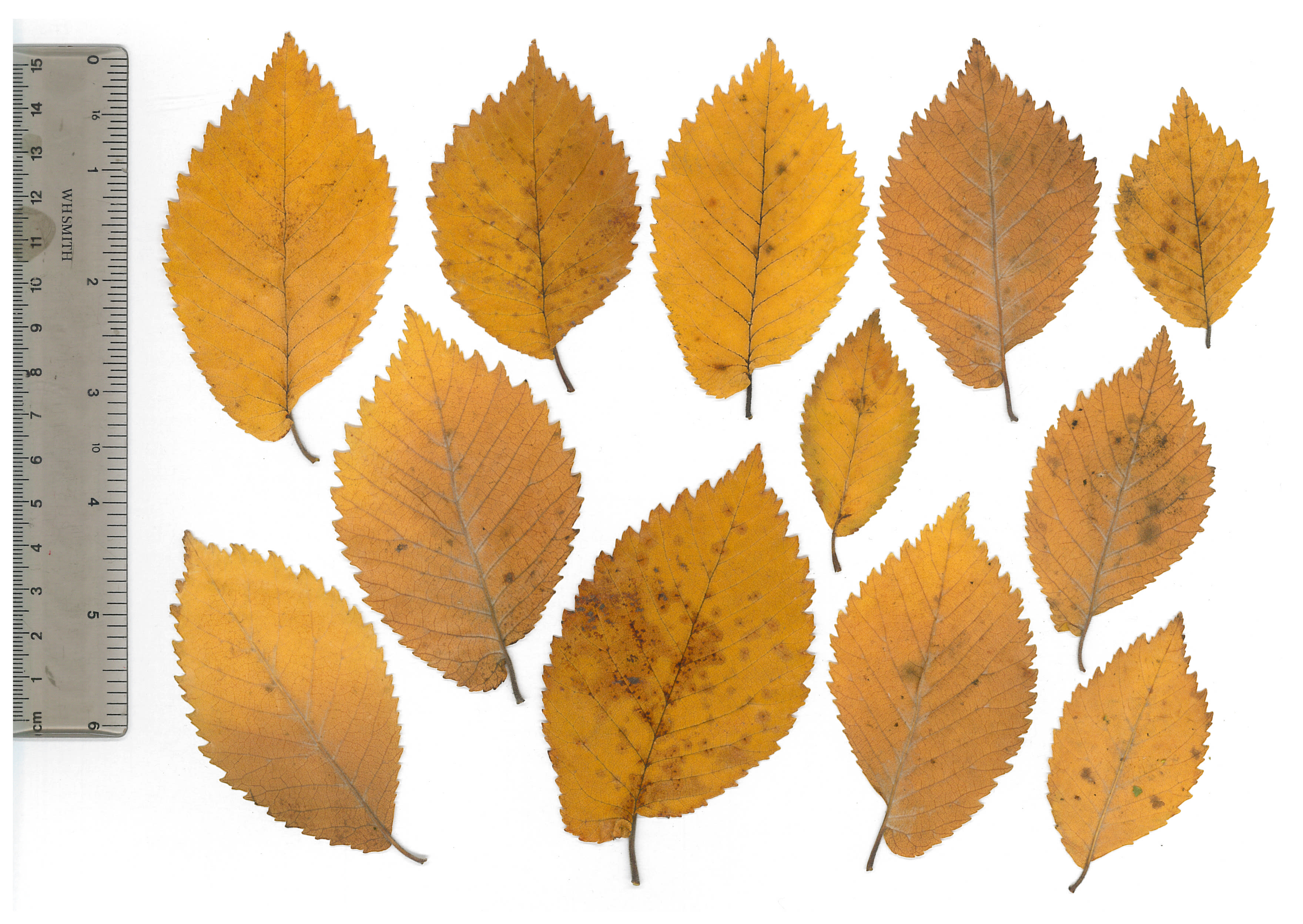
Pressed autumn leaves

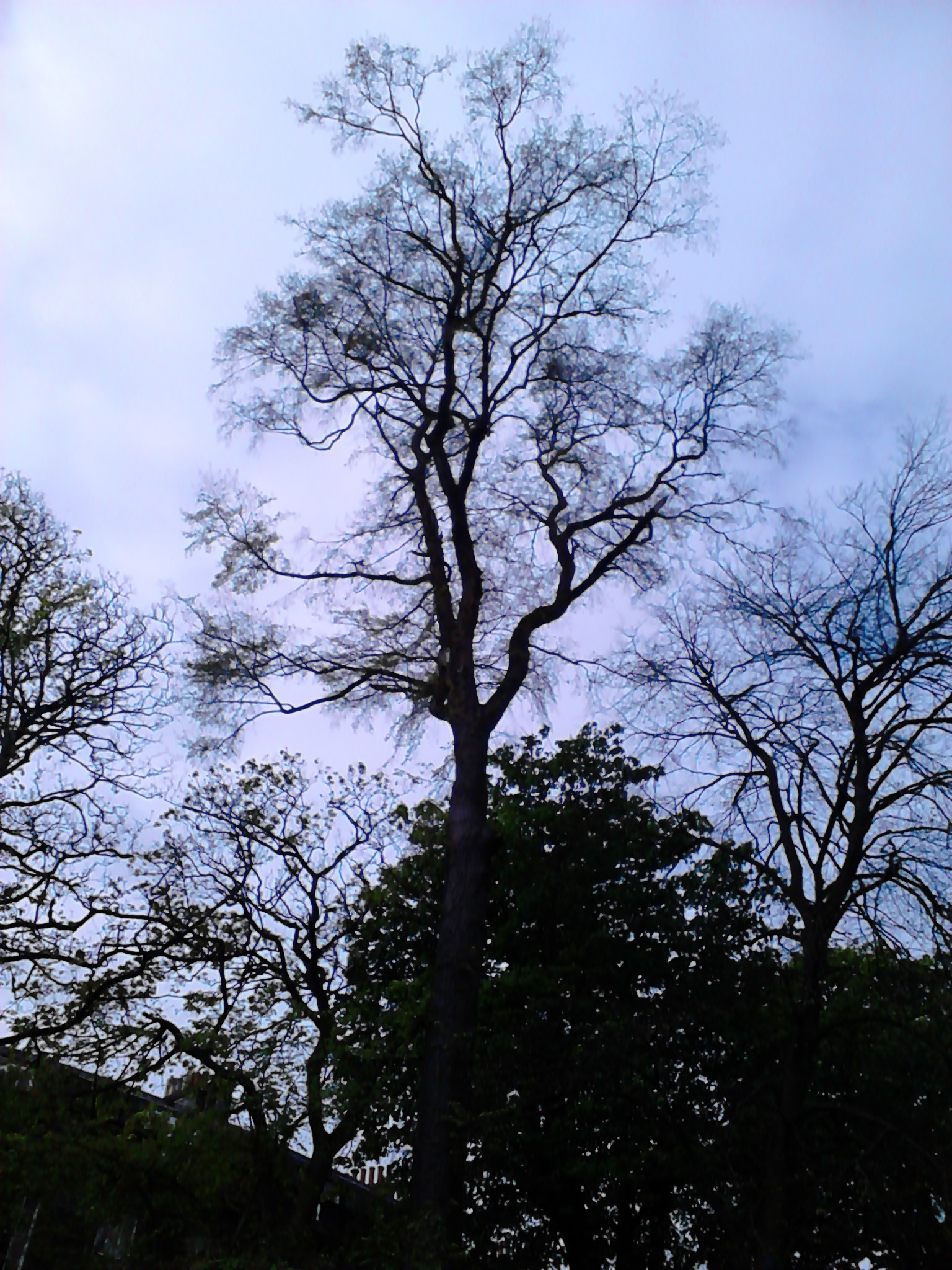
Spring silhouette

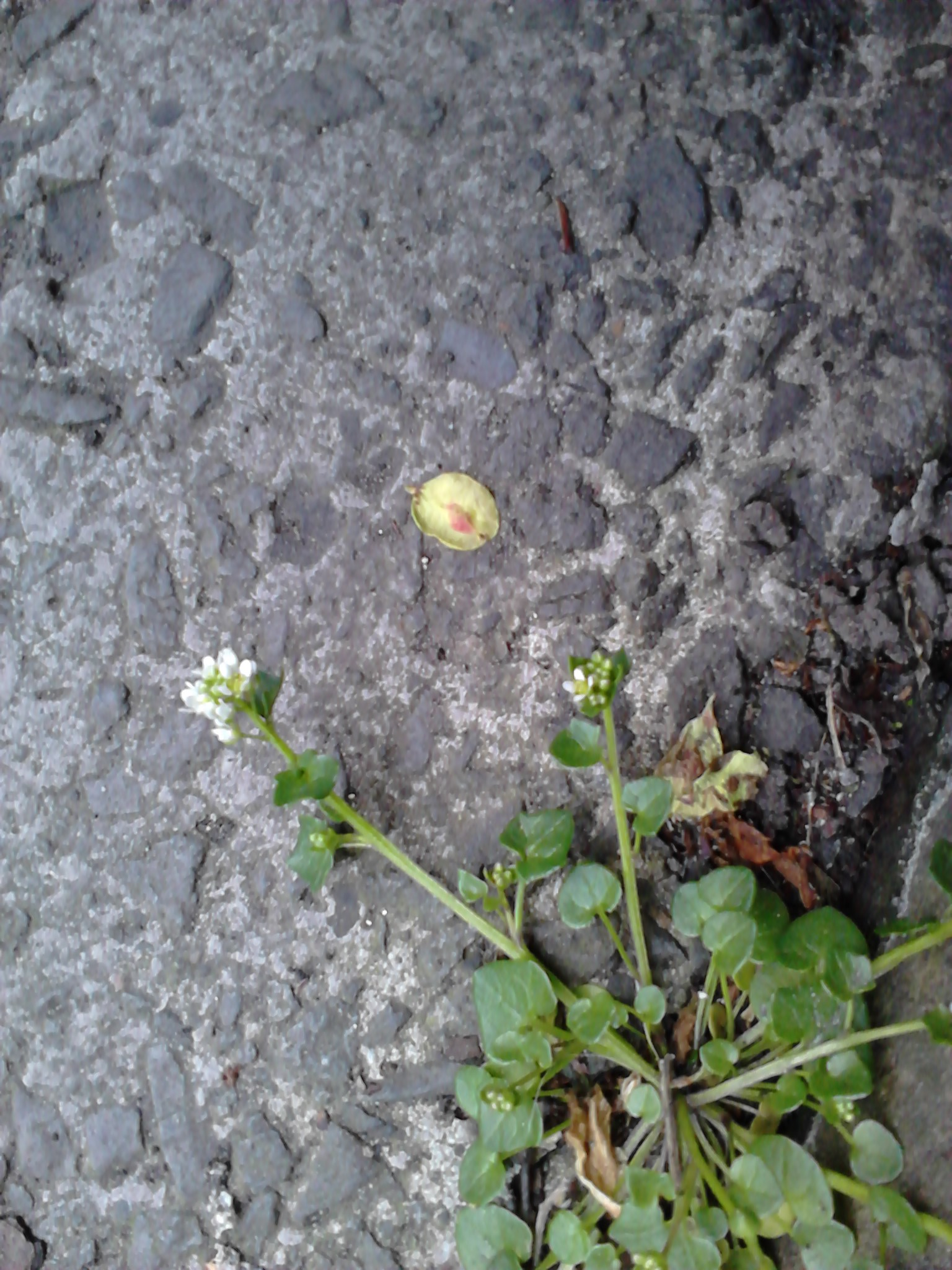
Samara

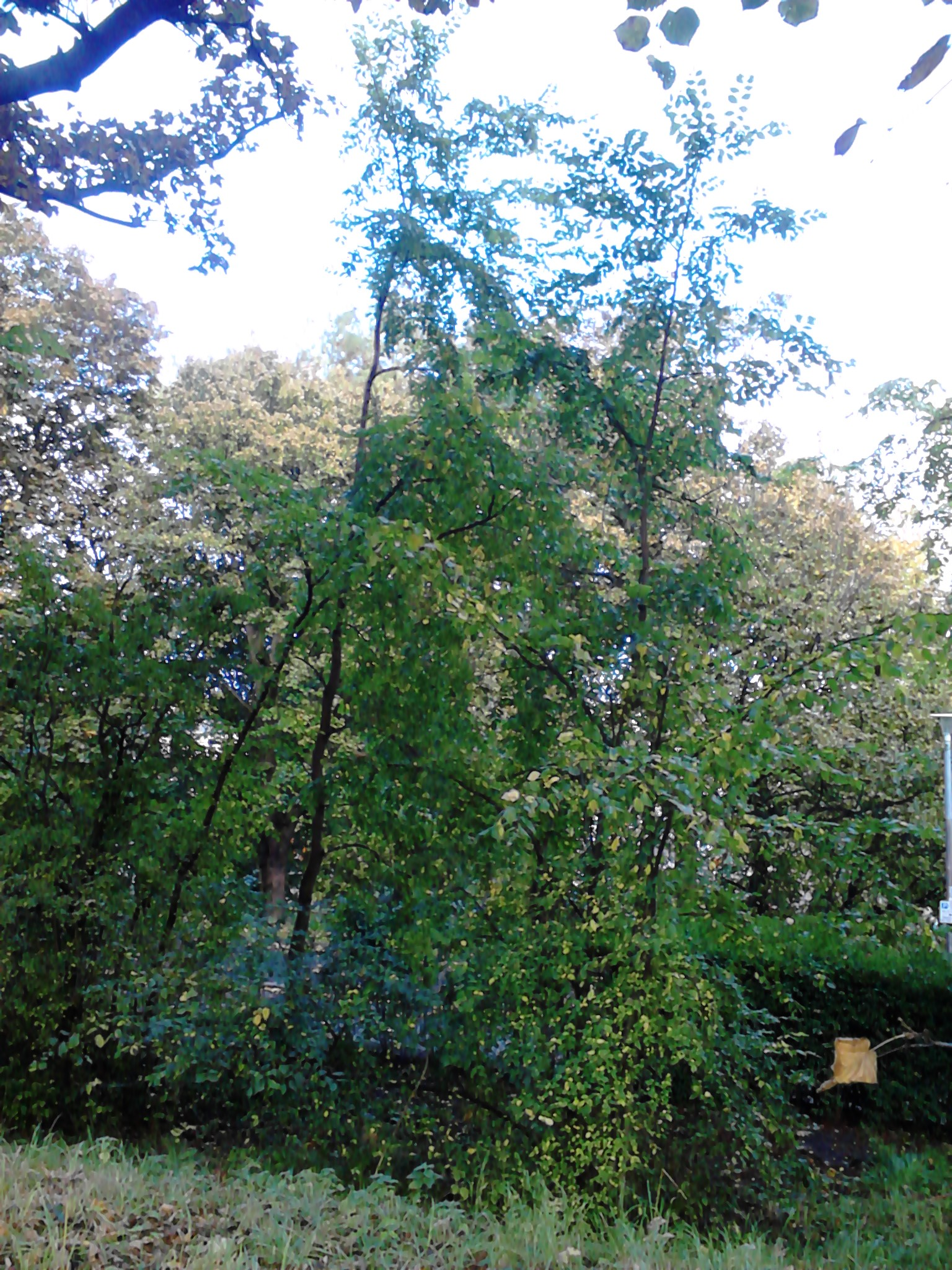
Young trees grown from suckers, showing frond-like leading shoots

== Synonymy ==
- Ulmus suberosa var. turkestanica
- Ulmus campestris turkestanica (?)
- Ulmus campestris var. laevis Regel (1879) (Litvinov, 1908)

== Accessions ==
=== Europe ===
- Royal Botanic Garden Benmore, UK, as U. turkestanica Regel, Acc. no. 19021007; misnamed (2004) U. pumila var. arborea Litv.; died 2022

=== North America ===
- Dominion Arboretum, Ottawa, Ontario, Canada. Accession no. 2626
