= Ulmus 'Den Haag' =

Elm cultivar

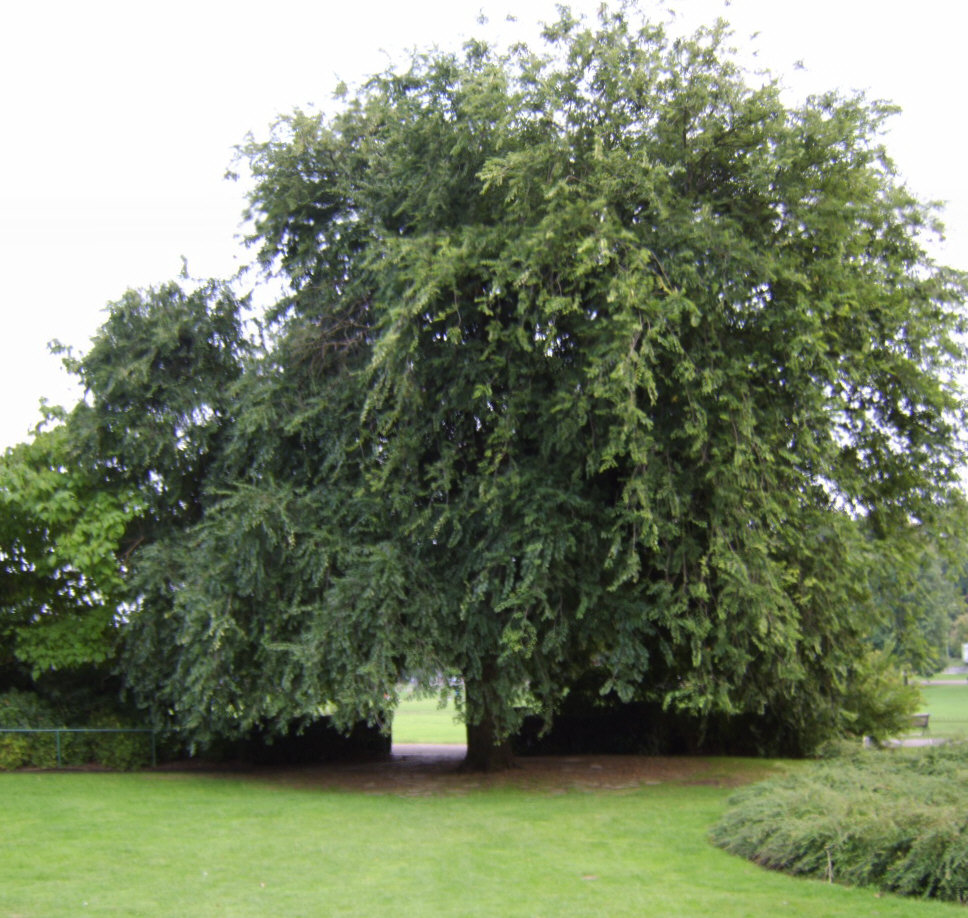
- 'Den Haag', Preston Park, Brighton
- Genus: Ulmus
- Hybrid parentage: U. pumila 'Pinnato-ramosa' × Ulmus × hollandica 'Belgica'
- Cultivar: 'Den Haag'
- Origin: The Netherlands

The hybrid elm cultivar Ulmus 'Den Haag' is a Dutch development derived from a chance crossing of the Siberian Elm cultivar Ulmus pumila 'Pinnato-ramosa' and the Belgian Elm Ulmus × hollandica 'Belgica'. S. G. A. Doorenbos (1891-1980), Director of Public Parks in The Hague, finding that seeds he had sown in 1936 from the Zuiderpark 'Pinnato-ramosa' had hybridized with the local 'Belgica', selected six for trials. The best was cloned and grafted on 'Belgica' rootstock as 'Den Haag'; it was planted first in that city, then released to nurseries elsewhere in the Netherlands. The other five were also planted in The Hague.

== Description ==
The tree is distinguished by its pendulous branches, and its foliage, which is light-green on emergence but turning lime-green and ultimately deep green by midsummer. The leaves are typical of U. pumila × Ulmus × hollandica, being very unequal at the base. The seed is central in the samara.

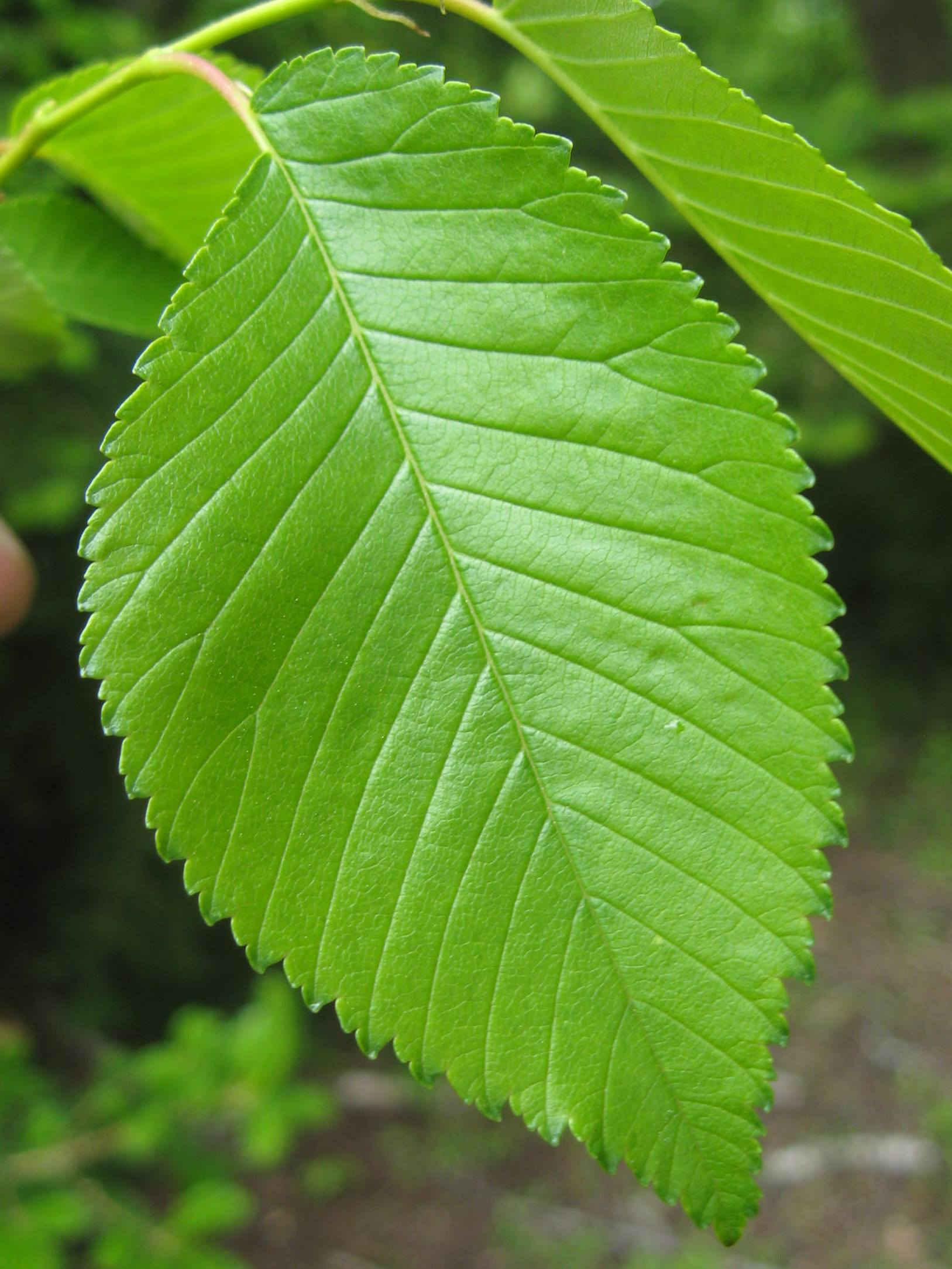
'Den Haag' leaf

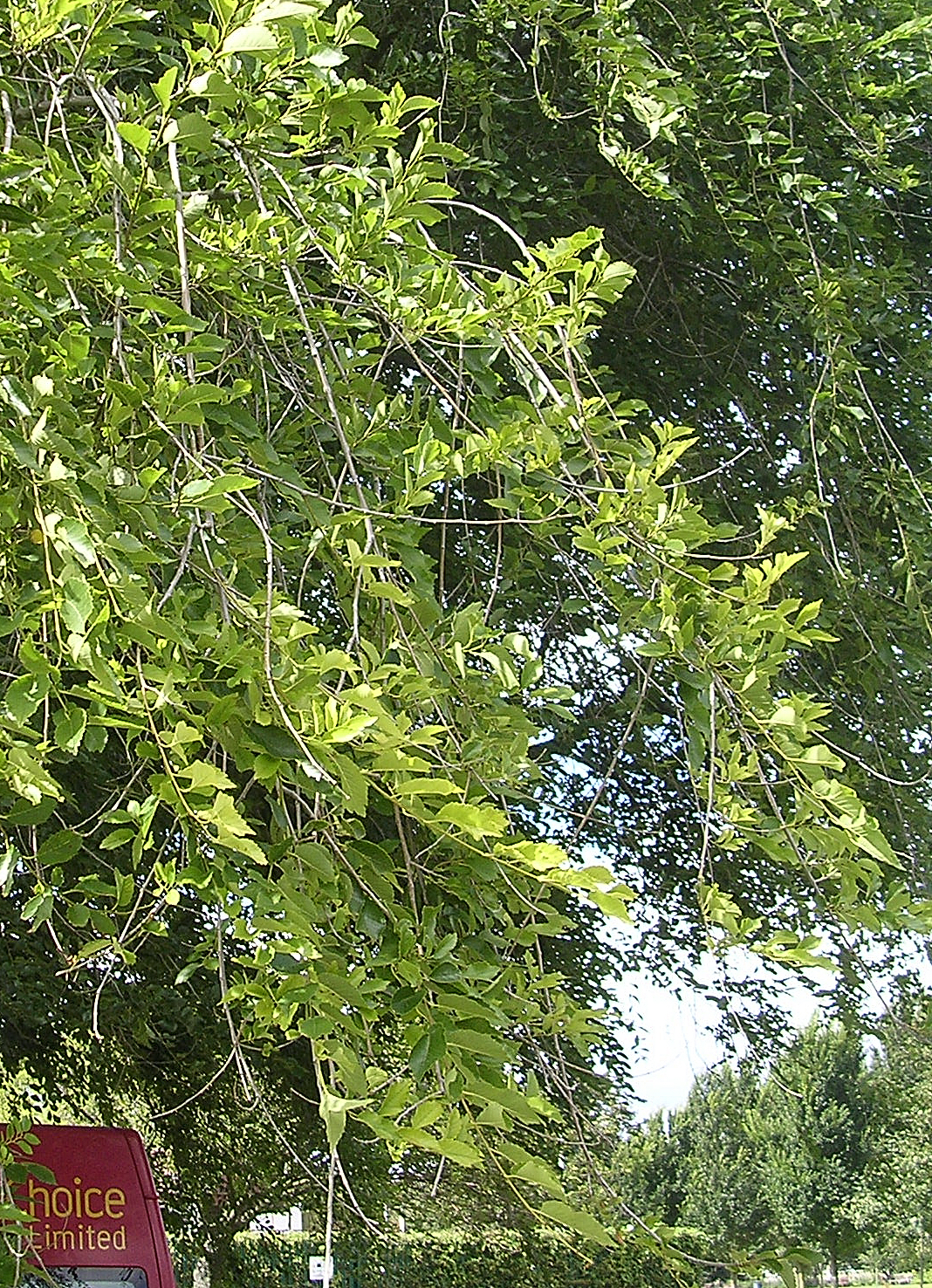
'Den Haag' long shoots

== Pests and diseases ==
Although reputed to be slightly resistant to Dutch elm disease, drought, and frost, the tree has brittle branches, and is vulnerable to Coral-spot Fungus Nectria cinnabarina

== Etymology ==
The tree is named for the city of Den Haag (known as The Hague in English). An unnamed cultivar of the same parentage stood in Zuiderpark, The Hague, in the mid-20th century.

== Cultivation ==
The tree remains in commerce in the Netherlands (on its own rootstock) and New Zealand. 'Den Haag' is not known to have been introduced to North America.

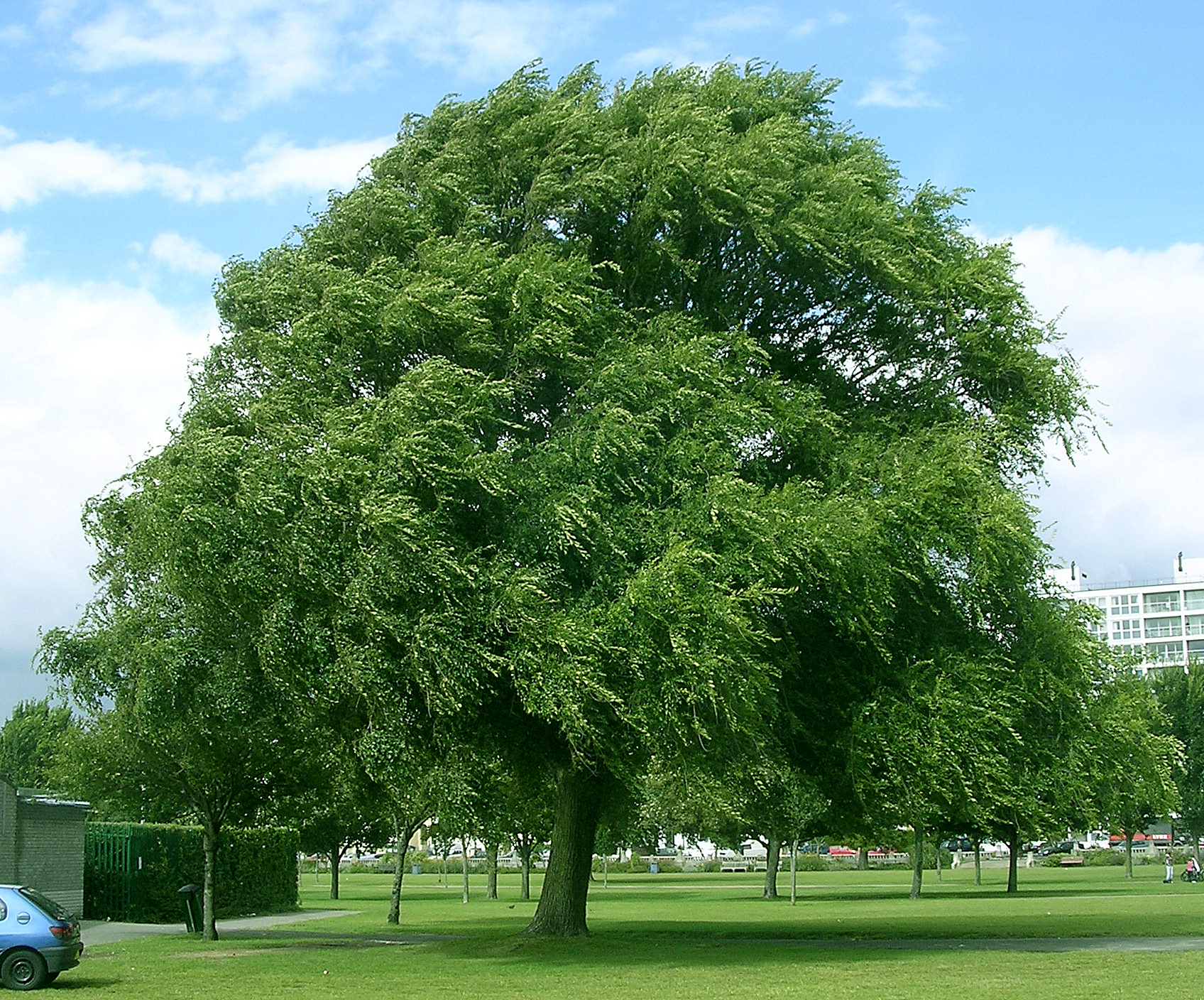
'Den Haag' on Southsea Common, Hampshire, UK (2007)

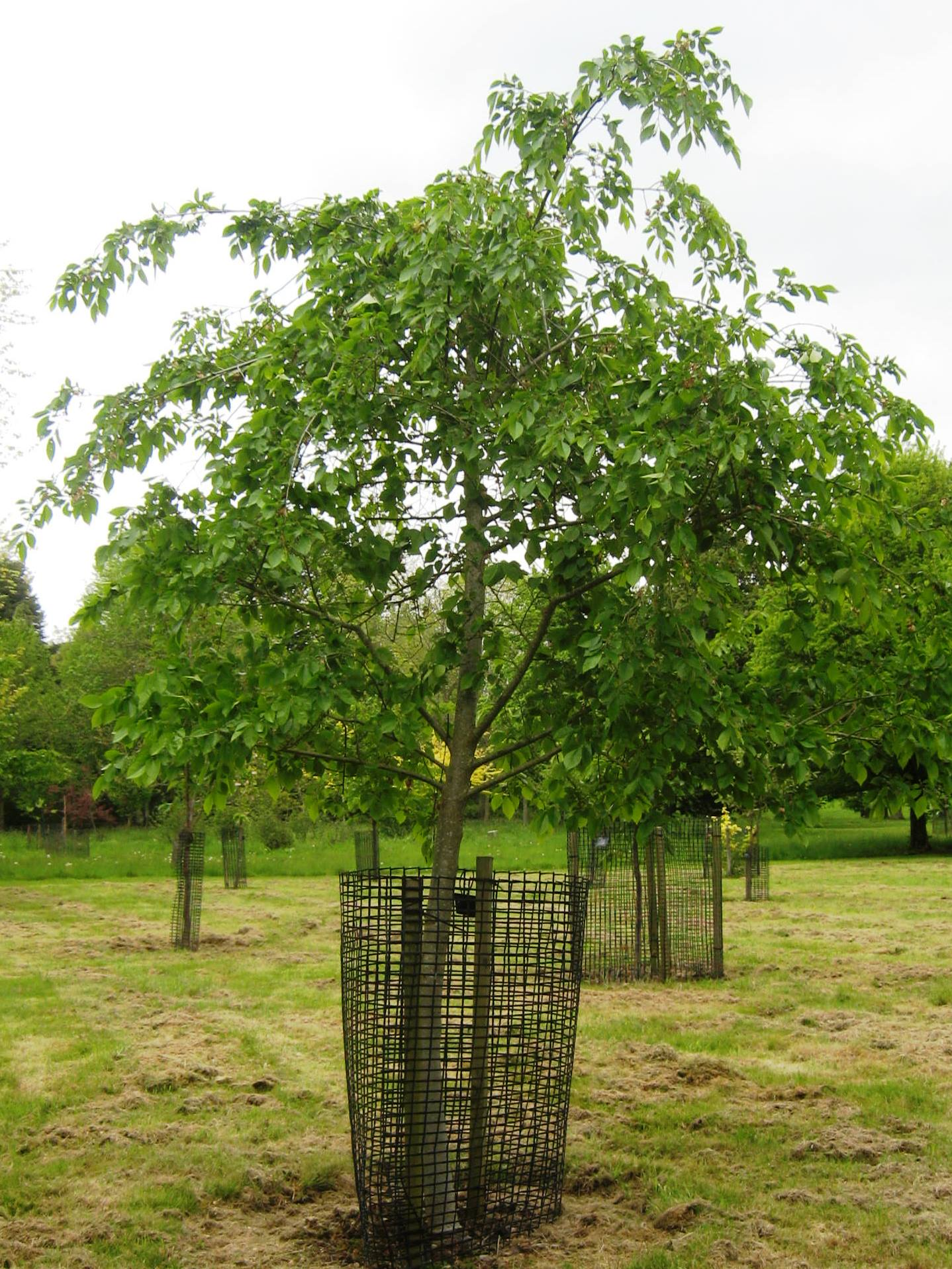
'Den Haag', Sir Harold Hillier Gardens, UK (2015)

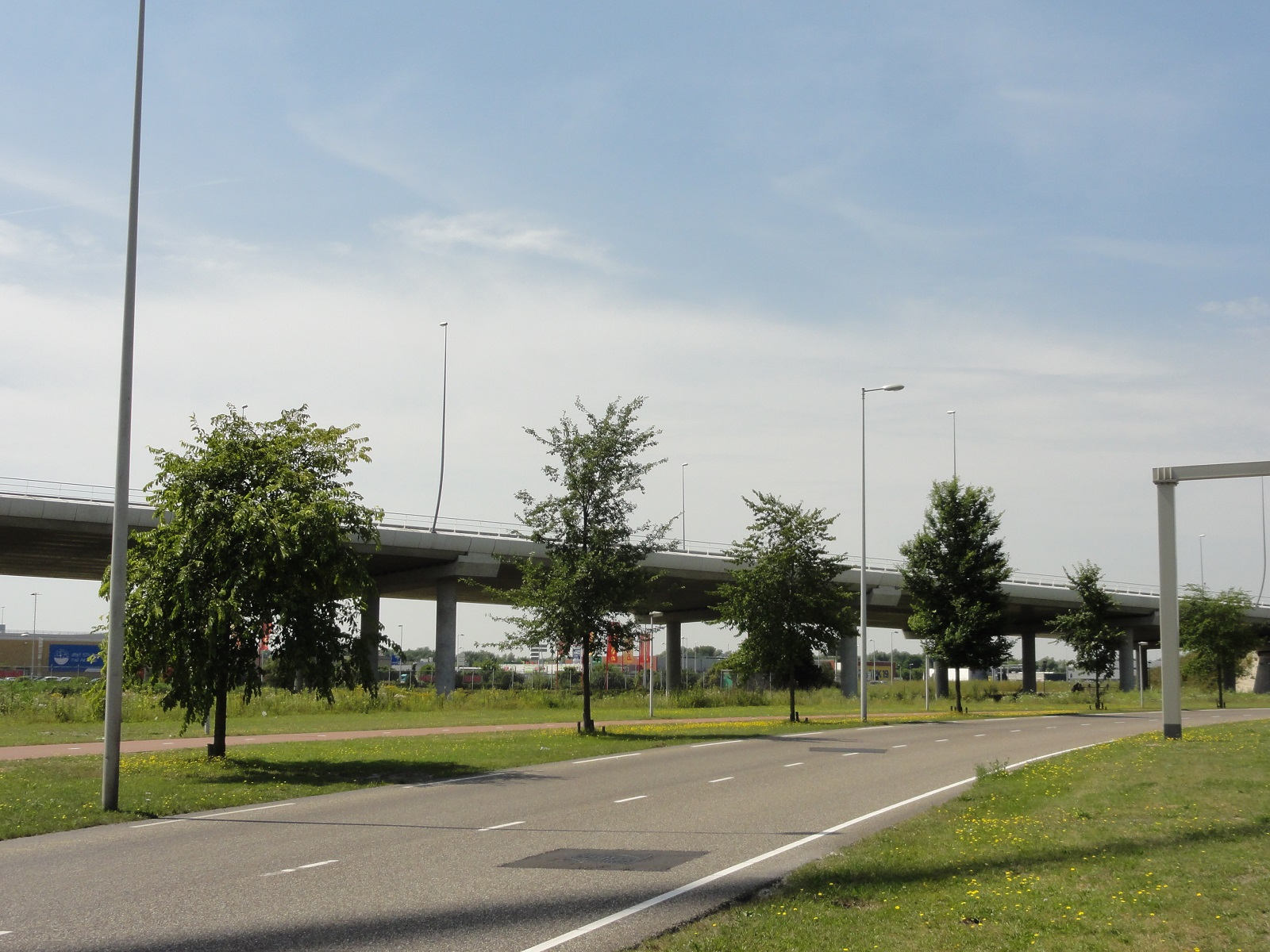
Elm cultivars, The Netherlands; 'Den Haag' far right of picture (2014)

== Notable trees ==
The UK TROBI Champion grows at Preston Park in Brighton, measuring 14 m high by 77 cm d.b.h. in 2009.

== Synonymy ==
- Ulmus 'Ieplaan': old (original?) name for Ulmus 'Den Haag'.
- Ulmus pumila 'Den Haag': various authorities.

== Accessions ==
Europe

- Brighton & Hove City Council, UK, NCCPG Elm Collection. Large tree in Preston Park.
- Grange Farm Arboretum, Sutton St James, Spalding, Lincs., UK. Acc. no. 819.
- Sir Harold Hillier Gardens, Romsey, Hampshire, UK. Acc. no. 2008.0114

== Nurseries ==
Europe

- De Reebock , Zwalm, Belgium.
- Noordplant , Glimmen, Netherlands.
- Van Den Berk (UK) Ltd., , London, UK

Australasia

- Big Trees, Nelson, New Zealand.
