= Georg Dieck =

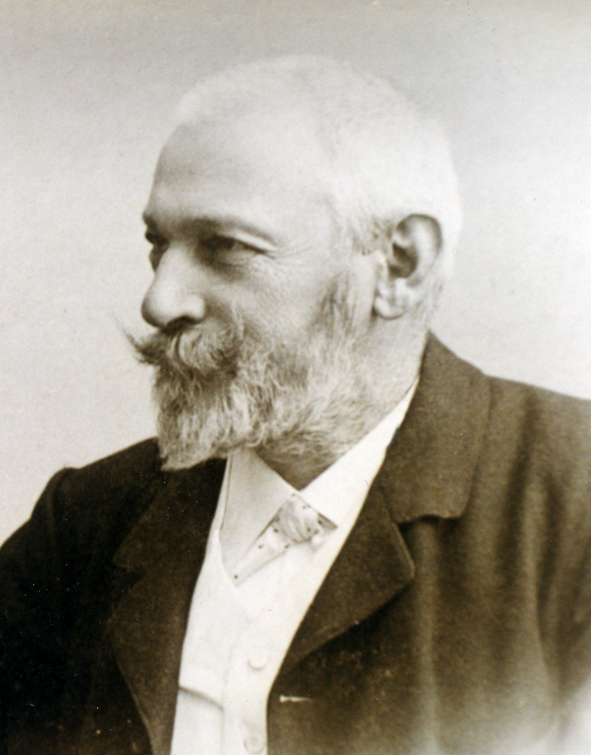
- Born: 28 April 1847; Zöschen, Province of Saxony, Kingdom of Prussia, German Confederation
- Died: 21 October 1925 (aged 78); Zöschen, Province of Saxony, Free State of Prussia, Weimar Republic
- Education: University of Jena
- Known for: Botanical and entomological research
- Scientific career
- Fields: Entomology, Botany

Georg Dieck (28 April 1847 in Zöschen – 21 October 1925 in Zöschen) was a German entomologist and botanist.

After attending high school in Naumburg, he studied natural sciences at Jena, where he was a pupil and assistant of Ernst Haeckel. In 1870, he taught in Zöschen at the large arboretum, where over 6000 different tree and shrub species were cultivated. In addition to the maintenance of plant collections, Dieck went on expeditions in the Rockies (1888), in the Caucasus (1891) and Spain (1892), where he collected beetles, plants and mosses, while new taxa such as Orthotrichum cupulatum var baldaccii were discovered. Further journeys led him to France, Italy and Sicily, Morocco, the Balkans and Turkey. He wrote many scientific papers describing new taxa, and introduced several plants to western cultivation, notably Ulmus pumila L. var. arborea Litv. from Turkestan.

His collections are in the University of Halle-Wittenberg (Biozentrum, World Coleoptera), Muséum national d'histoire naturelle in Paris (Turkey Lepidoptera), and the Natural History Museum in London (Turkey Lepidoptera). His collection of 450 rose species was presented at the world's fair in Paris in 1900.

Dieck was a Member of the Société entomologique de France.

== Eponymy ==
Several plant taxa are named for Dieck, including Brachythecium dieckii and maple Acer × dieckii hybrids.
