= Ulmus minor 'Umbraculifera' =

Elm cultivar

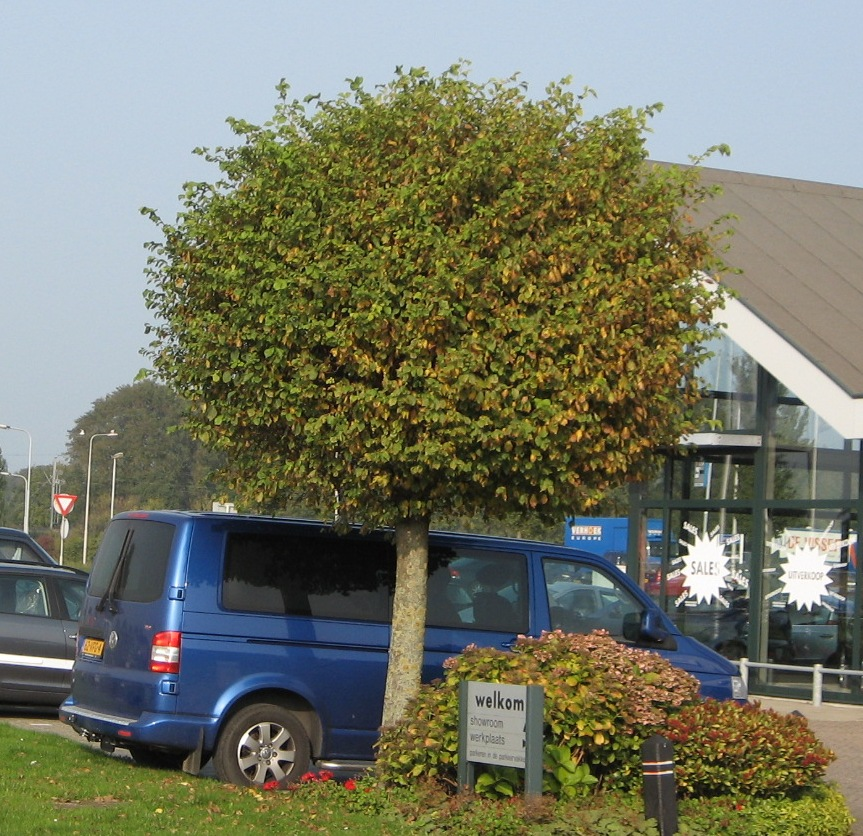
- 'Umbraculifera', Netherlands.
- Species: Ulmus minor
- Cultivar: 'Umbraculifera'
- Origin: Iran

The Field Elm cultivar Ulmus minor 'Umbraculifera' [:shade-giving] was originally cultivated in Iran, where it was widely planted as an ornamental and occasionally grew to a great size, being known there as 'Nalband' Persian: نعلبند [:the tree of the farriers] ("the famous 'Smithy elm' of Persia, where its dense top often forms the shelter of the native forgers"). Litvinov considered it a cultivar of a wild elm with a dense crown that he called U. densa, from the mountains of Turkestan, Ferghana, and Aksu. Non-rounded forms of 'Umbraculifera' are also found in Isfahan Province, Iran. Zielińksi in Flora Iranica considered it an U. minor cultivar.

'Umbraculifera' was introduced to Europe in 1878 by the Späth nursery of Berlin, by one account from a German gardener in the employ of the Shah of Persia, by another from M. Scharrer, inspector of Tiflis Imperial Gardens, Georgia. It was subsequently planted along streets in Berlin. Späth, along with Hesse of Weener, marketed the tree till the 1930s.

'Umbraculifera' was introduced to the United States in 1912 as "Karagatch" (Ulmus densa syn. U. campestris [:U. minor] 'Umbraculifera') at the USDA's Chico Plant Introduction Station in California by Frank Meyer, who collected it from the Russian imperial estate at Murgrab, Turkestan (see photo taken by Meyer in 'Notable trees' below).

Green mistook Späth's U. turkestanica Regel (the U. 'Turkestanica' of his Register of Cultivars) for a synonym of 'Umbraculifera'. Späth listed U. turkestanica Regel and U. campestris umbraculifera separately in his catalogues, where 'Umbraculifera' appears as "Ball elm. Transcaucasia, Persia. Needs no pruning. Valuable as a single tree, free-standing in park or street".

== Description ==
The tree is distinguished by its dense, rounded, sometimes flat-topped habit. Henry's statement (1913) that "it differs from ordinary U. nitens [: U. minor] only in its peculiar habit" suggests that, in one form of the tree at least, the leaf is not distinctive. Some herbarium specimens show almost rhomboidal, probably juvenile, leaves. The tree is reputedly always grafted on to U. minor standards. It grows 5 to 8 ft in diameter in twelve to fifteen years.

An early 20th-century Samarkand photograph in Schedae ad Herbarium florae URSS (1922) (see Gallery), shows that 'Umbraculifera' ('Bubyriana') is not dissimilar in appearance to its putative hybrid Ulmus 'Androssowii'. Rehder noted (1939) that though similar in habit to 'Androssowi', 'Umbraculifera' could be "easily distinguished" from it. In 'Umbraculifera' the twigs are red-brown and never corky, the leaves are clearly and sharply double-toothed, only slightly pubescent beneath when young and soon smooth, and the obovate fruit is wedge-shaped at base and about 1.5 cm long, with the seed close to the notch. 'Androssowii', by contrast, has grayish-brown bark on twigs with conspicuous corky wings on older branches, pubescent winter-buds, mostly shallow- and single-toothed leaves, pubescent beneath, and near-orbicular fruit 10-13 mm in diameter, with the seed slightly above the middle.

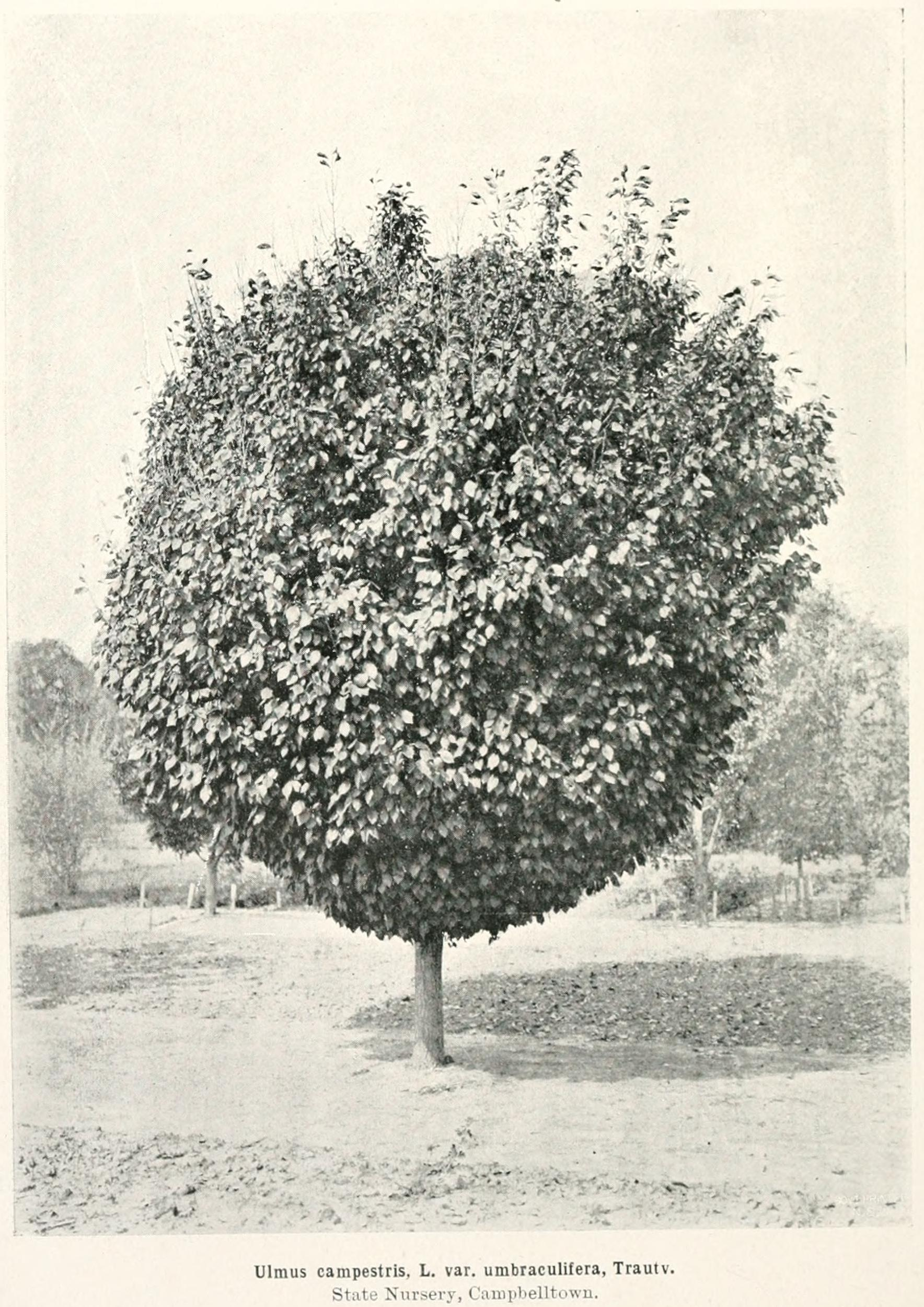
'Umbraculifera', State Nursery, Campbelltown, New South Wales, 1908

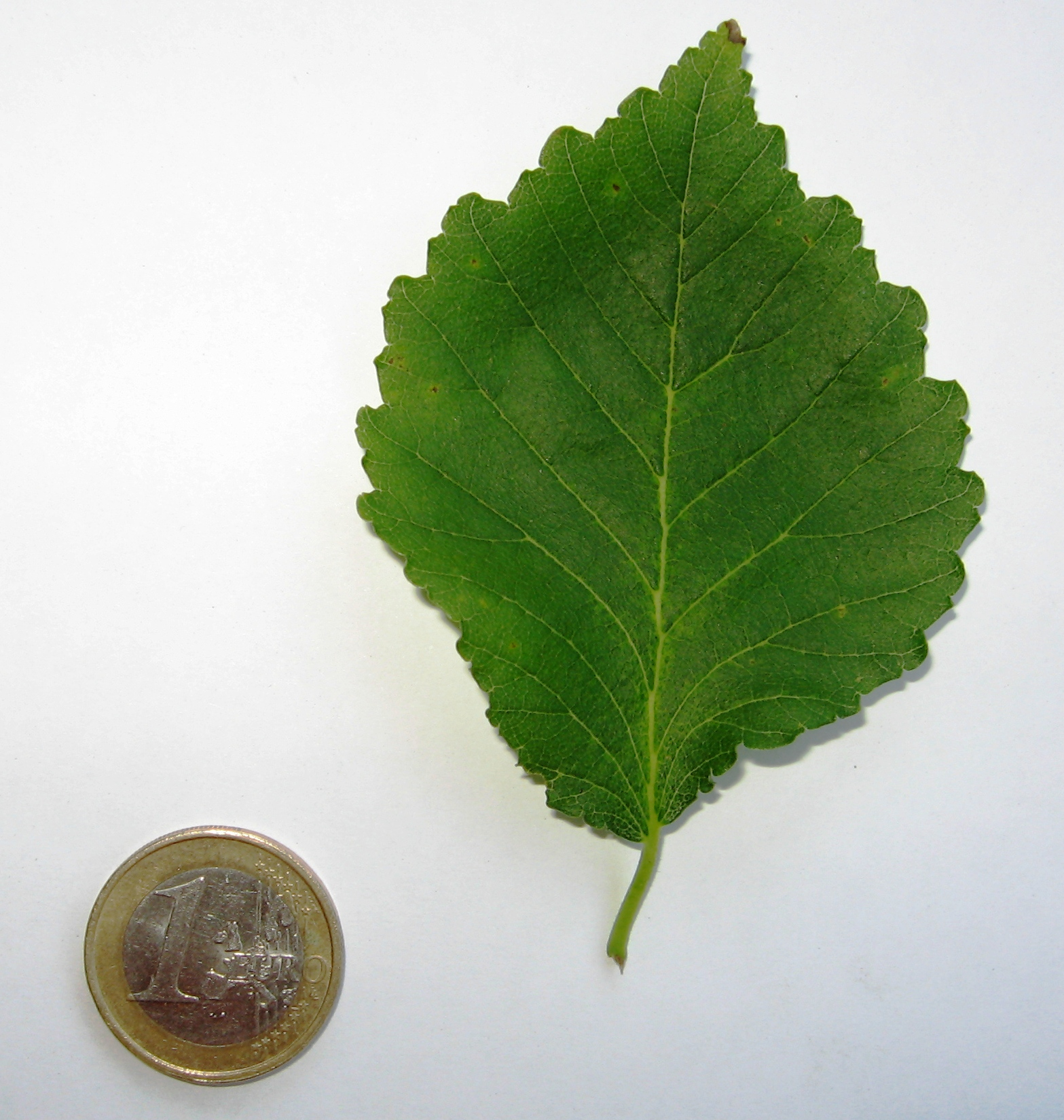
Juvenile leaf of 'Umbraculifera'

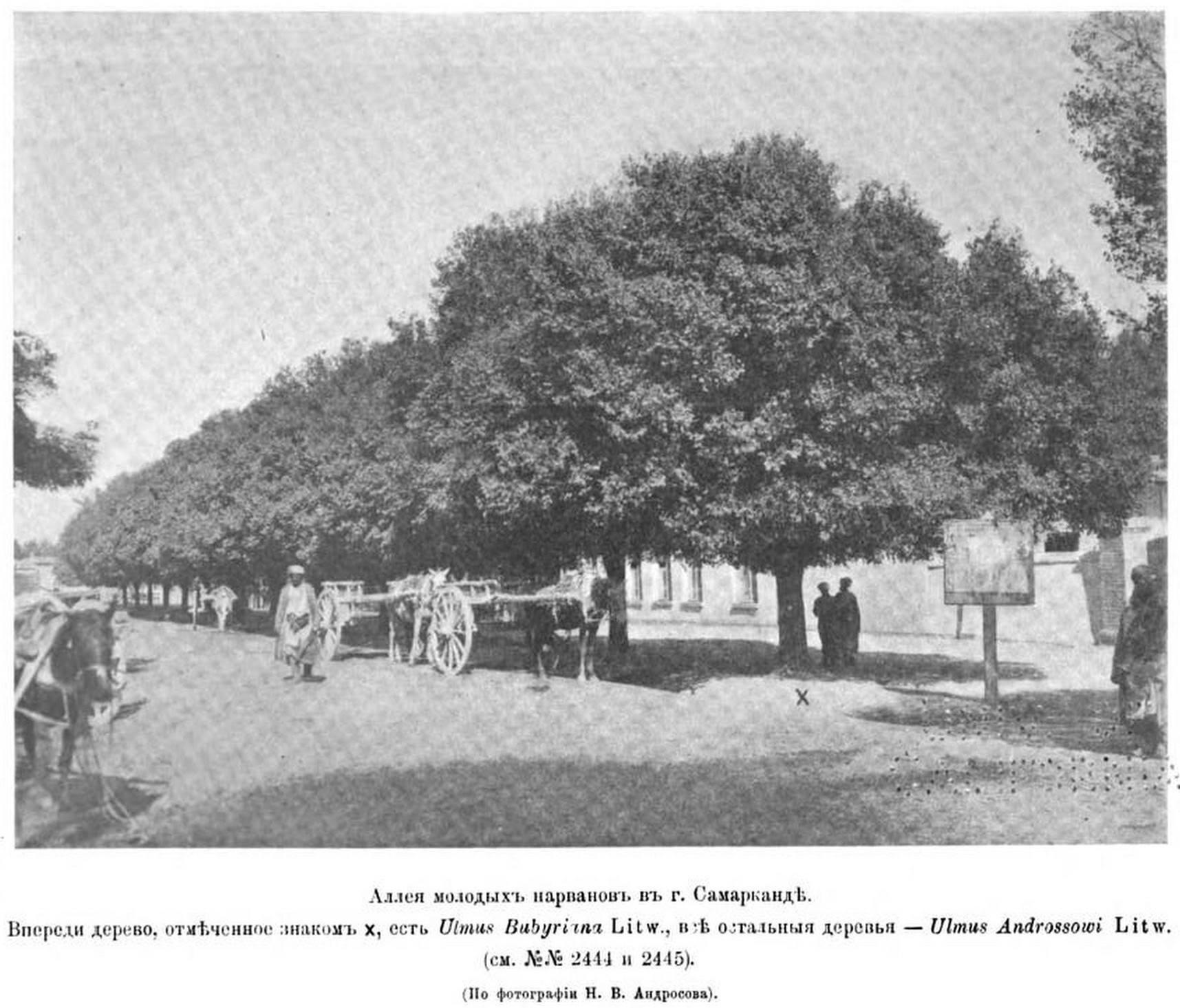
'Bubyriana' ('Umbraculifera') right, 'Androssowii' left, Samarkand (1903)

== Pests and diseases ==
The tree is as vulnerable to Dutch elm disease as the species.

== Cultivation ==
The tree was introduced to the Caucasus, Armenia and Turkestan, and it remains in cultivation in central and south-west Asia. Bean remarked that the tree succeeded well on the continent (Europe) and in eastern North America, but was rarely planted in the UK. Henry (1913) mentions an example at Kew Gardens, obtained in 1904 from Simon-Louis of Metz, France. A specimen stood in the Ryston Hall arboretum, Norfolk, in the early 20th century. The tree featured, as "Späth's globe-headed elm", on the cover of the 1913 catalogue of Klehms' nurseries of Arlington Heights, Illinois, with a detailed description. Klehms' propagated the clone in quantity. In 1947 the nearly two-mile long avenue of 30 year-old 'Umbraculifera' along 19th Avenue Boulevard in Moline, Illinois, was described as "the only street of Globe-heads in the country". Introduced to Australia, the tree was marketed in the early 20th century by the Gembrook Nursery near Melbourne, and by Searl's Garden Emporium, Sydney, but it is not known whether the tree survives in that country. Despite its susceptibility to Dutch elm disease, it remains in commercial cultivation in Belgium and the Netherlands.

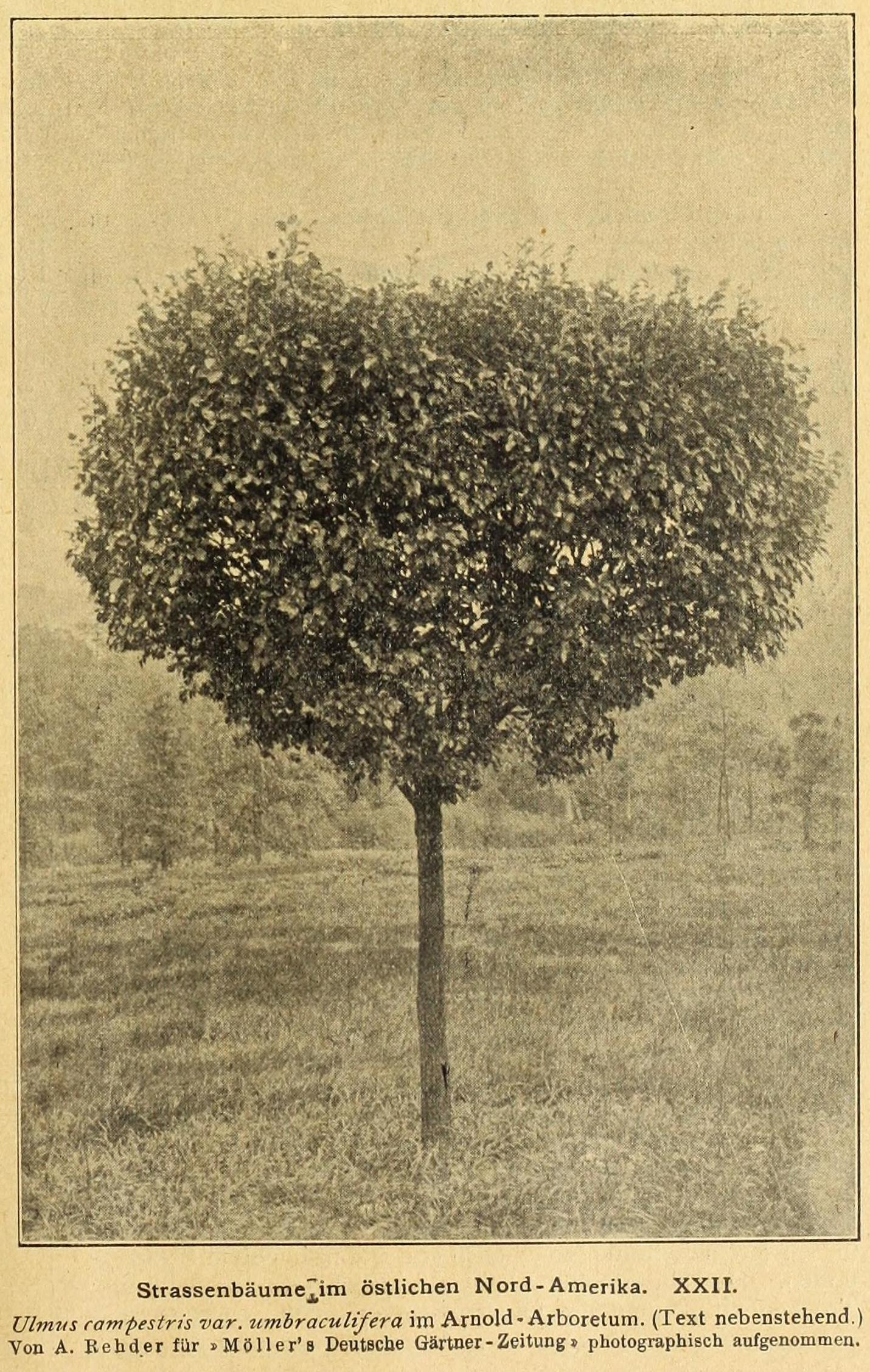
'Umbraculifera', Arnold Arboretum, Massachusetts, c.1900

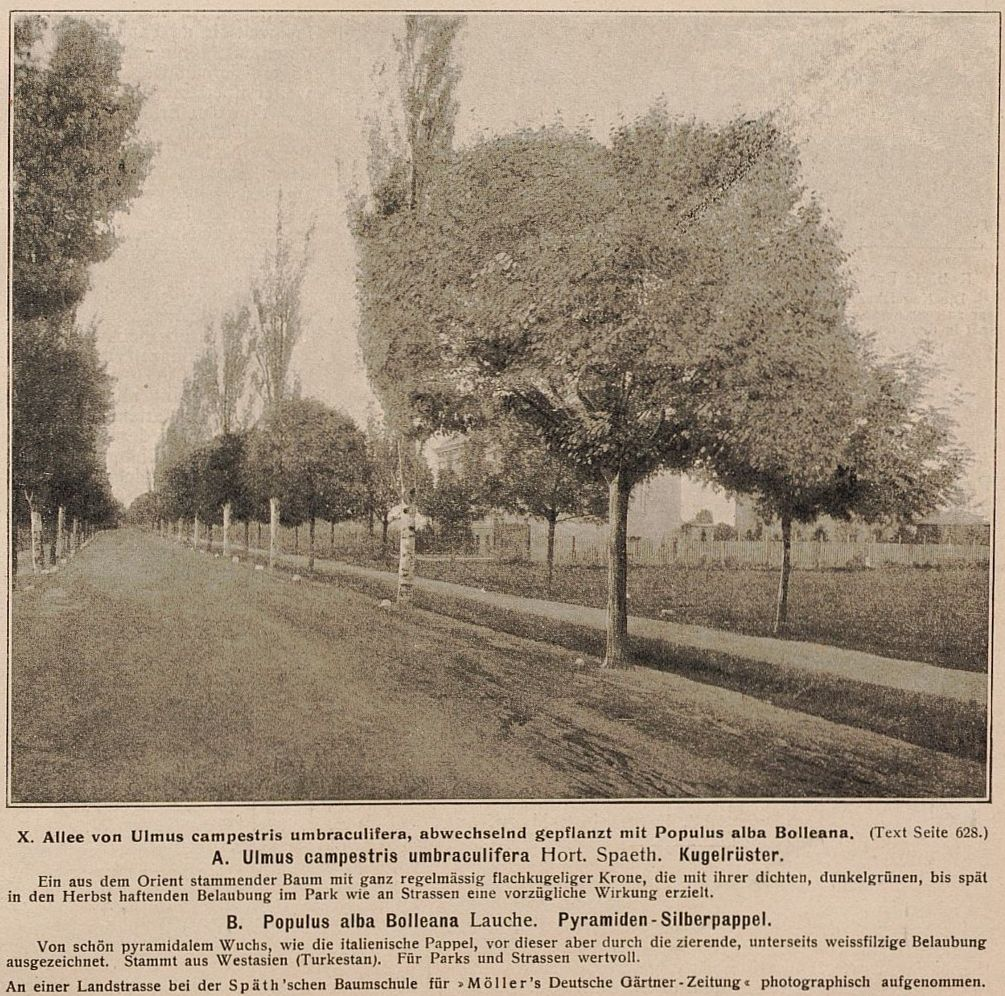
'Umbraculifera' avenue near the Späth nursery, Berlin, 1903

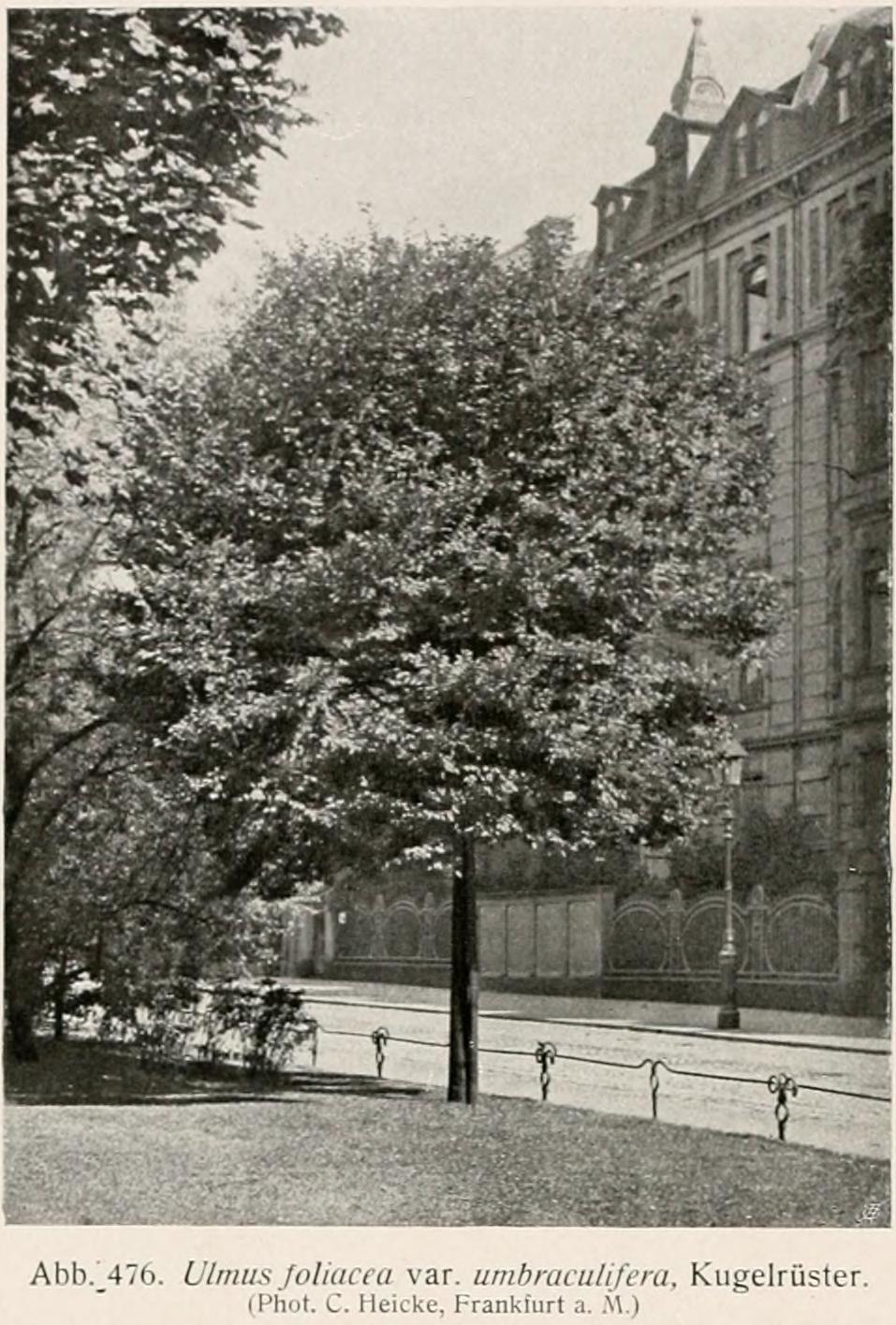
'Umbraculifera' in Germany, 1912

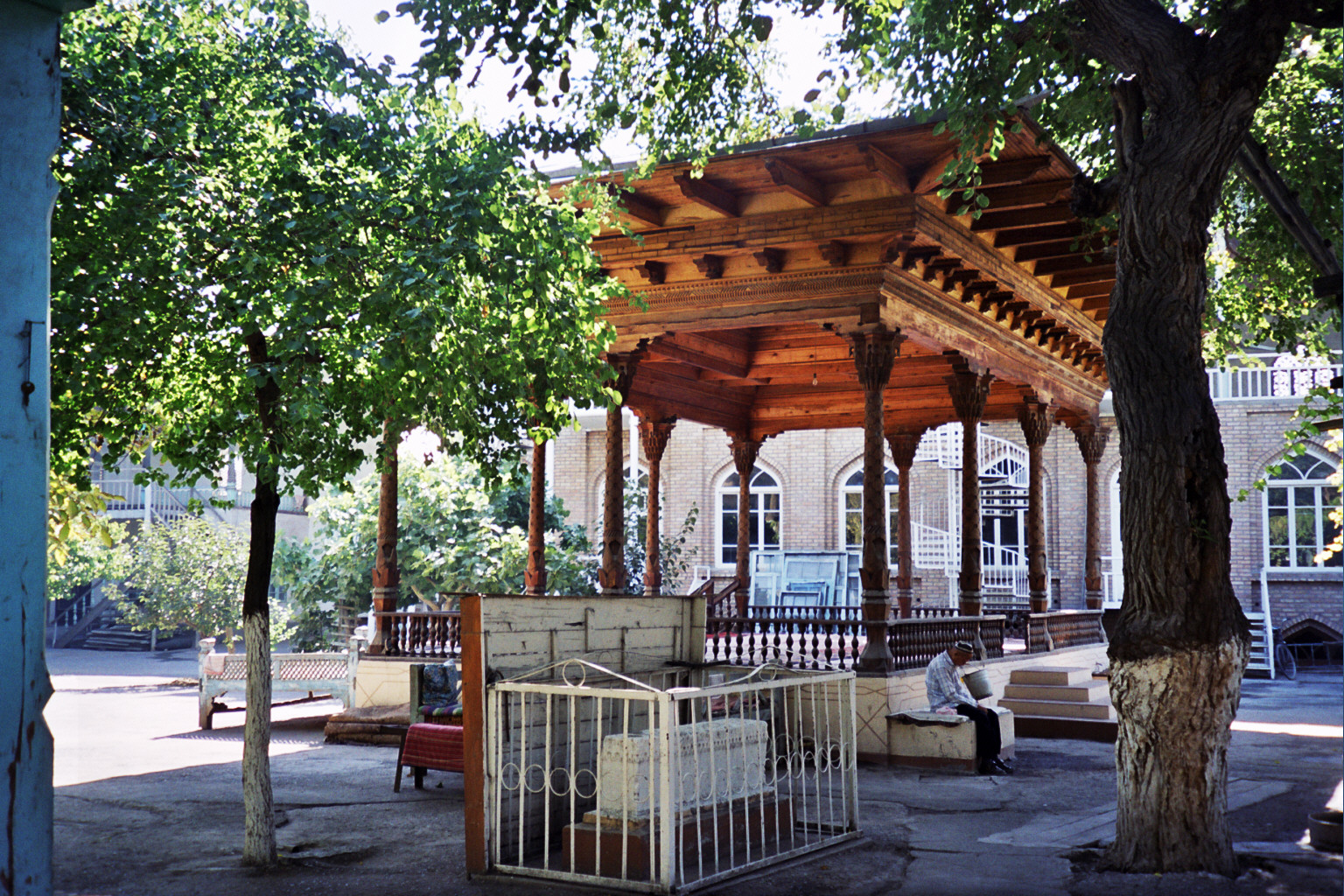
'Umbraculifera' in Margilan, Uzbekistan

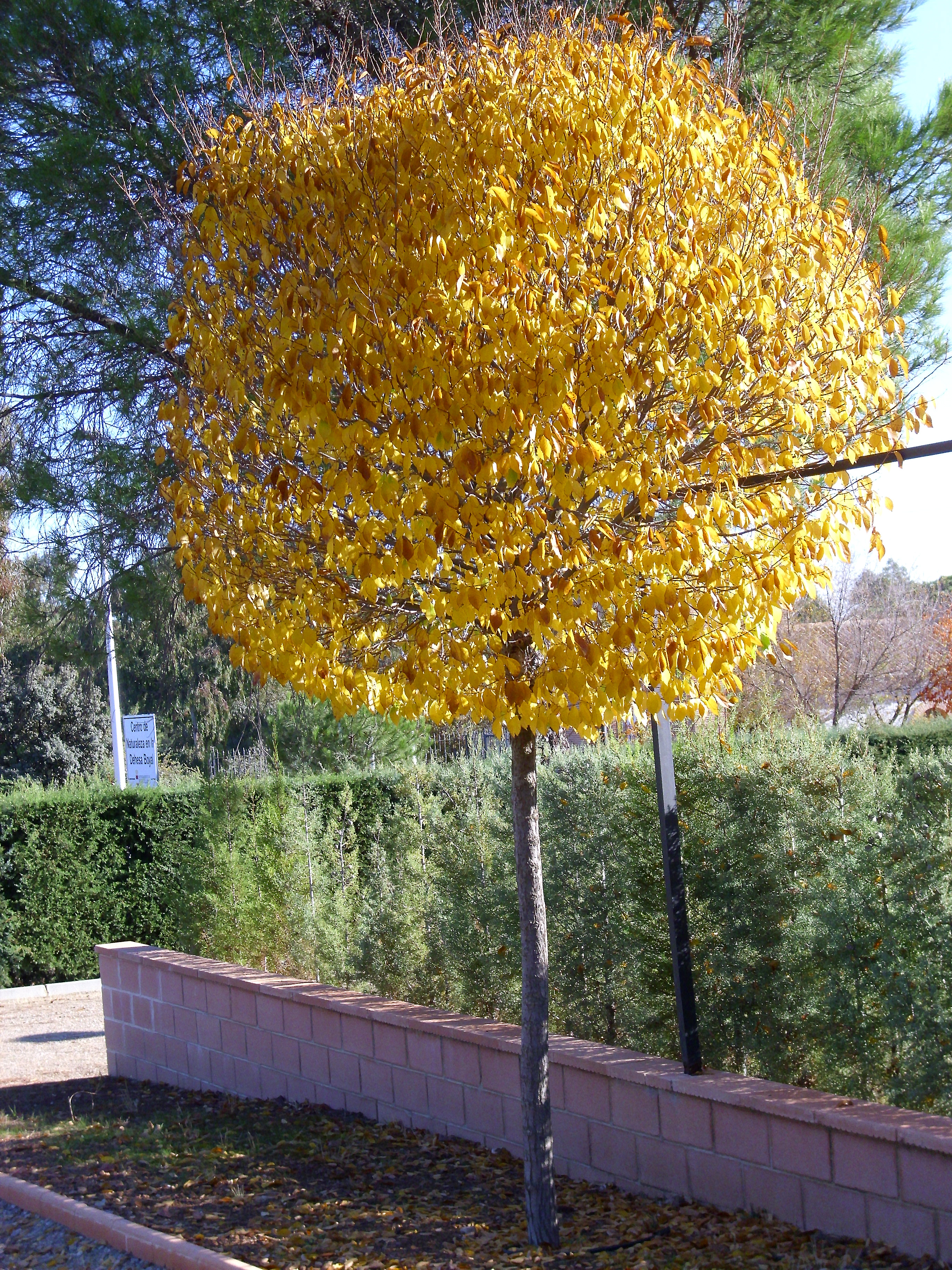
'Umbraculifera', Puertollano Botanical Gardens, November

=== Putative specimens in Budapest ===
A field elm cultivar in the People's Park, Budapest, in the early 20th century, presumably grafted at ground level and trained to a neat cone, illustrated in Möller's Deutsche Gärtner-Zeitung (1918) as Ulmus campestris als Pyramidenbaum [:field elm as pyramidal tree], may have been trimmed 'Umbraculifera'.

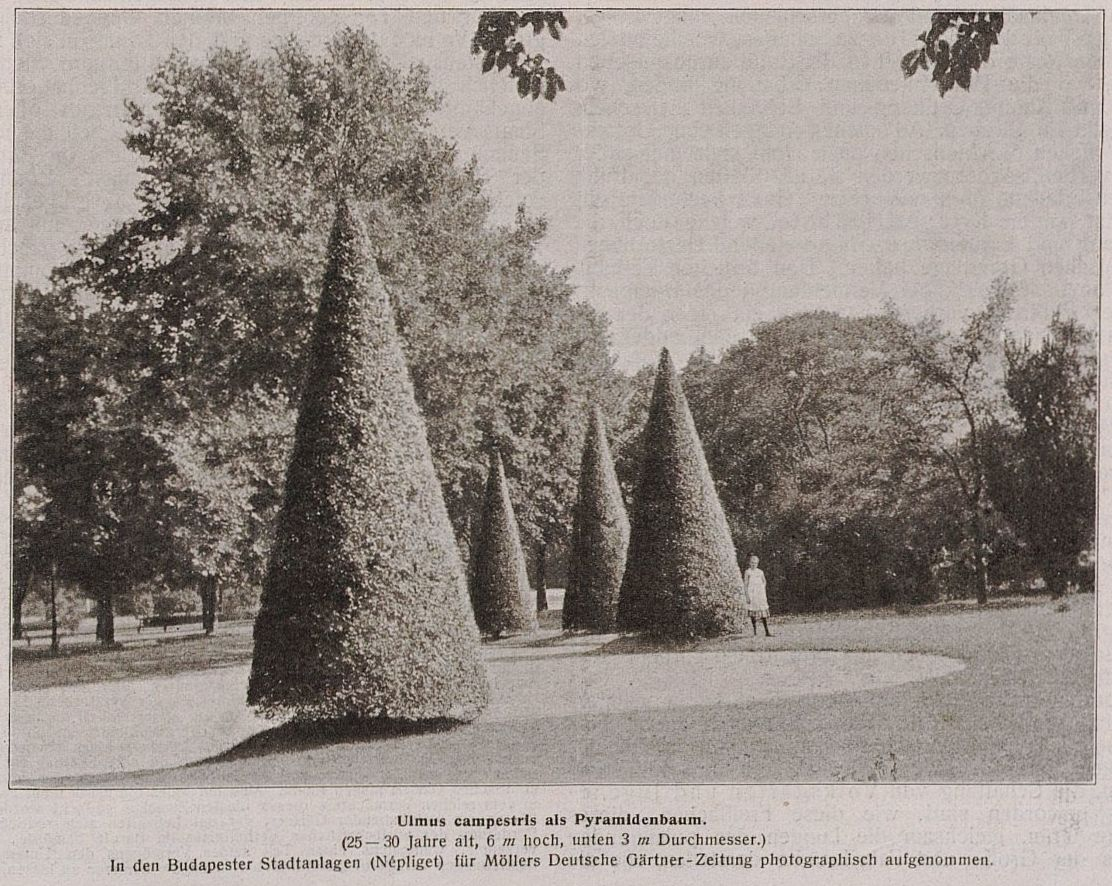
Trimmed field elm in Budapest, c.1917

== Varieties ==
The Field Elm cultivar Ulmus minor 'Umbraculifera Gracilis' was obtained as a sport of 'Umbraculifera' by Späth c.1897-8.

== Notable trees ==
Regel's Gartenflora (1881) contains an illustration, mentioned by Elwes and Henry in their account of 'Umbraculifera', of a great old tree near Eriwan. An avenue of dense globose trees, considered 'Umbraculifera' by Meyer at a time when the hybrid 'Androssowii' determination was unknown, once grew at the Russian imperial estate of Murgrab at Bairam-ali near Merv, formerly Russian Turkestan.

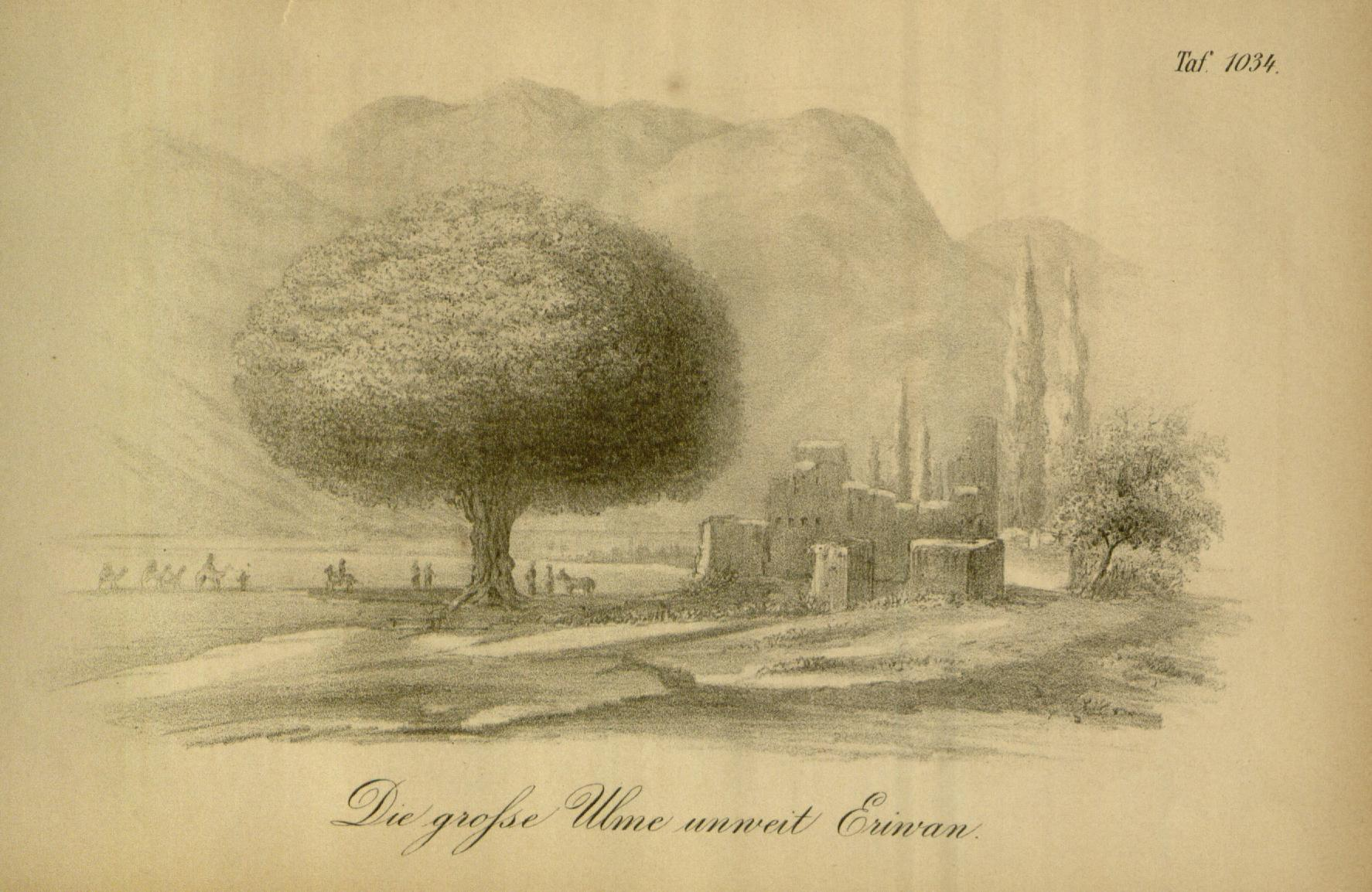
'Umbraculifera' near Eriwan, Armenia. Engraving by Scharrer.

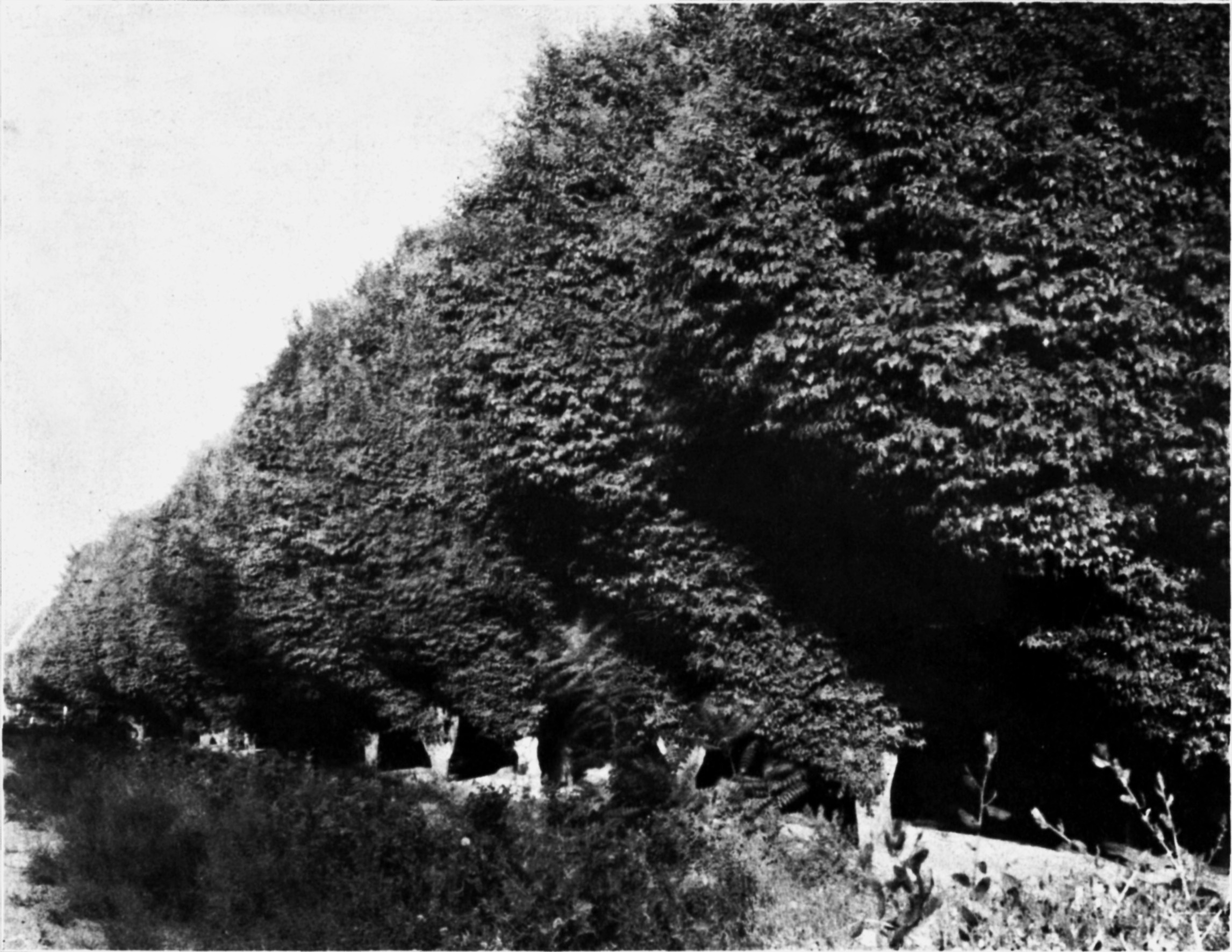
Meyer's "U. densa (U. campestris umbraculifera)" (but possibly 'Androssowii'), Murgrab near Bairam-ali (c.1912).

== Synonymy ==
- Karagatch, also applied to Central Asian field elms generally and to the hybrid cultivar Ulmus 'Karagatch'
- Narwan: The common name for 'elm' in Persian, nār-van [:elm-tree], confusingly similar to the local name for the pomegranate, anār-van [:pomegranate-tree]. In Tehran, Umbraculifera is called nārvan-e čatrī [:canopy-like elm].
- Ulmus densa var. nalband Talibov
- Ulmus densa var. bubyriana: Litv., Schedae ad Herbarium Florae Rossicae 6: 163, no. 1991, t.1, 2, 1908 and Schedae ad Herbarium Florae Rossicae 8: 23, no. 2444, t. 2, 1922 resp. In the latter, Litvinov described it from a cultivated tree in Samarkand.

== Hybrid cultivars ==
- Ulmus × androssowii

== Accessions ==
=== Europe ===
- Hortus Botanicus Nationalis, Salaspils, Latvia. Acc. no. 18147

=== North America ===
- Washington Park Arboretum, Seattle, Washington, US. Acc. no. 602-39

== Nurseries ==
=== Europe ===
- Boomwekerijen 'De Batterijen', Ochten, Netherlands..
- Kwekerij Johan Van Herreweghe, Schellebelle, Belgium.
- Jacobs Plantencentrum, Venlo, Netherlands.
- Kwekerij De Reebock, Zwalm, Belgium.
- Tuincentrum Semperflorens, Roosendaal, Netherlands.
- Tuincentrum Vechtweelde, Maarssen, Netherlands.
