= Zöschen =

- Stadtteil of Leuna
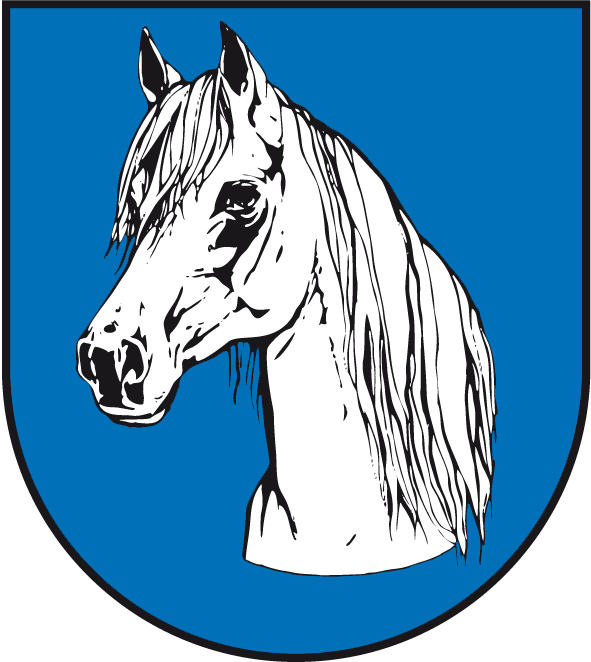
- Coat of arms
- Interactive map of Zöschen
- Location within Germany Location within Saxony-Anhalt
- Coordinates: 51°21′N 12°7′E
- Country: Germany
- State: Saxony-Anhalt
- District: Saalekreis
- Town: Leuna

Area
  - Total: 7.20 km^{2} (2.78 sq mi)
- Elevation: 104 m (341 ft)

Population (2006-12-31)
  - Total: 1,036
  - Density: 144/km^{2} (373/sq mi)
- Time zone: UTC+01:00 (CET)
  - Summer (DST): UTC+02:00 (CEST)
- Postal codes: 06254
- Dialling codes: 034638

Zöschen (German pronunciation: [ˈtsœʃn̩]) is a village and a former municipality in the district Saalekreis, in Saxony-Anhalt, Germany. Since 31 December 2009, it is part of the town Leuna.
