= Ulmus pumila 'Aurea' =

Elm cultivar

Ulmus pumila 'Beijing Gold'
- Species: Ulmus pumila
- Cultivar: ’Beijing Gold’
- Origin: China

The Siberian elm cultivar Ulmus pumila was known as 'Aurea' (selling name Beijing Gold™) was released by the Honze nursery in China shortly before the Beijing Olympics in 2008. Its former cultivarname was not accepted by E.N.A. and thus changed into ‘’Beijing Gold’’ although the species is a cultivar from U. pumila, it is falsely advertised as a 'Chinese elm', which is U. parvifolia.

== Description ==
‘’Beijing Gold’’ forms a dense shrub or small very broad tree growing to a height of < 6 m, bearing soft yellow foliage that retains its colour from early spring to early autumn.

== Pests and diseases ==
See under Ulmus pumila.

== Cultivation ==
The cultivar was introduced to the UK in 2008, but is not known to be in cultivation in North America.

== Accessions ==
=== Europe ===
- Grange Farm Arboretum, Sutton St. James, near Spalding, Lincs., UK. Acc. no. 692.
- Netherlands Plant Collection Ulmus, Wijdemeren, North-Holland, Netherlands

== Nurseries ==
=== Europe ===
- Gardening Express , Chelmsford, UK
- Marcopolo Plants , Boskoop, Netherlands
- Noordplant Nurseries , Glimmen, Netherlands
