= Ulmus pumila 'Pyramidalis Fiorei' =

Elm cultivar

- Species: Ulmus pumila
- Cultivar: 'Pyramidalis Fiorei'
- Origin: US

The Siberian Elm cultivar Ulmus pumila 'Pyramidalis Fiorei' was cloned by the Charles Fiorei Nurseries of Prairie View, Illinois, c. 1957 from a tree growing in nursery grounds.

== Description ==
The tree was described as being "strictly pyramidal" in form.

== Pests and diseases ==
See under Ulmus pumila.

== Cultivation ==
The tree is no longer listed by the Fiorei nursery and has probably been lost to cultivation.
