= Ulmus pumila 'Mr. Buzz' =

Elm cultivar

- Species: Ulmus pumila
- Cultivar: 'Mr. Buzz'
- Origin: Alabama, USA

The Siberian Elm cultivar Ulmus pumila 'Mr. Buzz' is a selection made by the Westerveldt Tree Co. of Selma, Alabama.

== Description ==
'Mr. Buzz' was distinguished by its dense crown and dark-green foliage.

== Pests and diseases ==
See under Ulmus pumila.

== Cultivation ==
Reputedly of vigorous growth, the tree had been withdrawn from commerce before 1995. It is not known whether it still survives.
