= Ulmus × arbuscula =

Scientific classification
- Kingdom: Plantae
- Clade: Tracheophytes
- Clade: Angiosperms
- Clade: Eudicots
- Clade: Rosids
- Order: Rosales
- Family: Ulmaceae
- Genus: Ulmus
- Species: U. × arbuscula

Binomial name
- Ulmus × arbuscula E.L.Wolf

Elm hybrid

Ulmus × arbuscula [: "bushy" ] is a putative hybrid of Ulmus scabra (: glabra) and Ulmus pumila raised from seed collected from a large wych elm in the St. Petersburg Botanic Garden in 1902. A similar crossing was cloned ('FL025') by the Istituto per la Protezione delle Piante (IPP), Florence, as part of the Italian elm breeding programme circa 2000.

== Description ==
The St. Petersburg tree bore leaves 17–75 mm long with 20 lateral veins, side shoots <125 mm long and leader shoots <170 mm long, and was described as "a shrubby tree with pleasing foliage and branches appearing quite decorative". In 1913 Späth described the tree as intermediate in appearance, with leaves 7–10 cm long, pointed-ovate, double-toothed, "dense-nerved", grey-green and rough above, light green below.

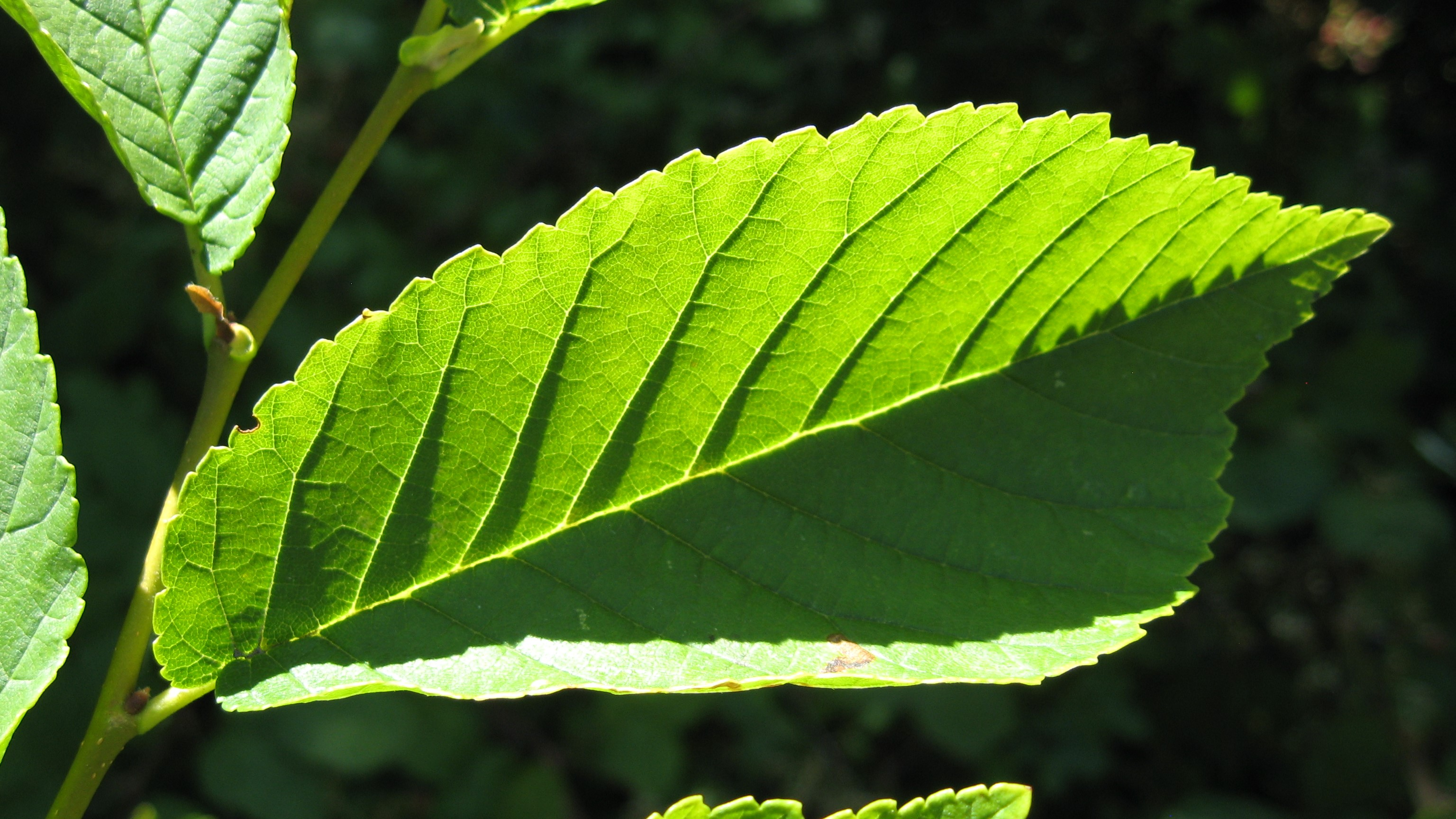
FL025 leaf, Cams Bay, Fareham, England

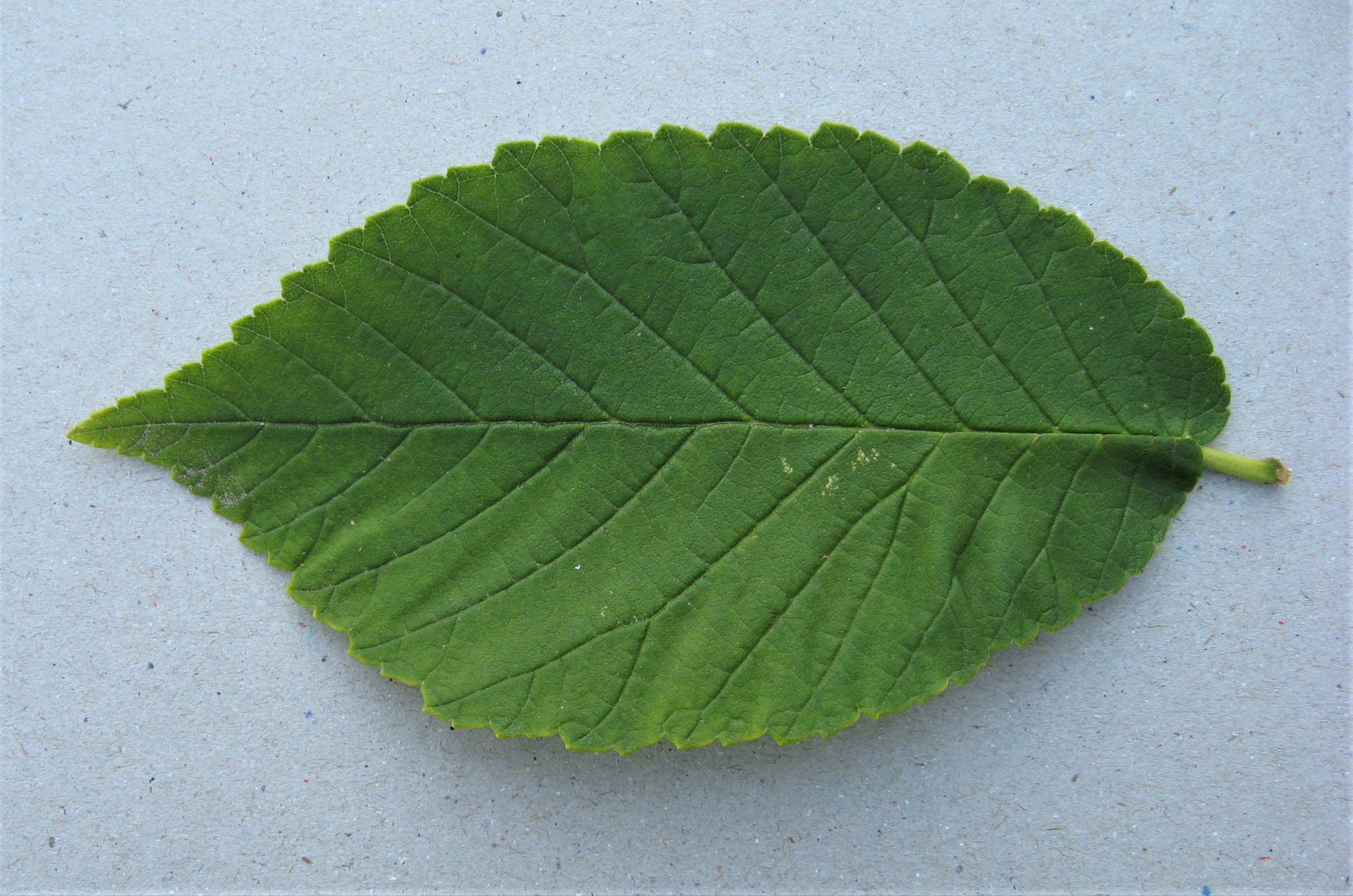
FL025 leaf

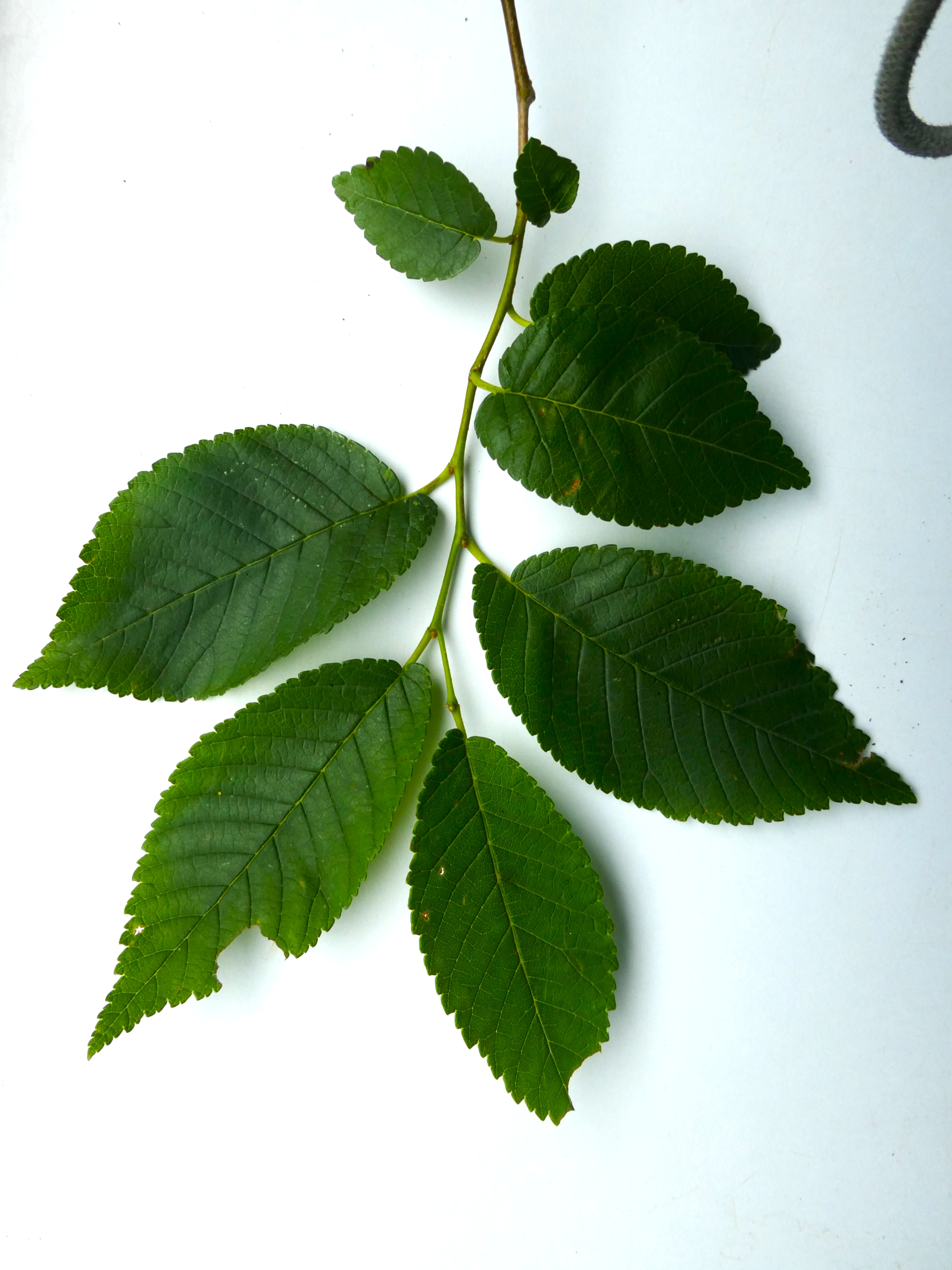
FL025 branchlet

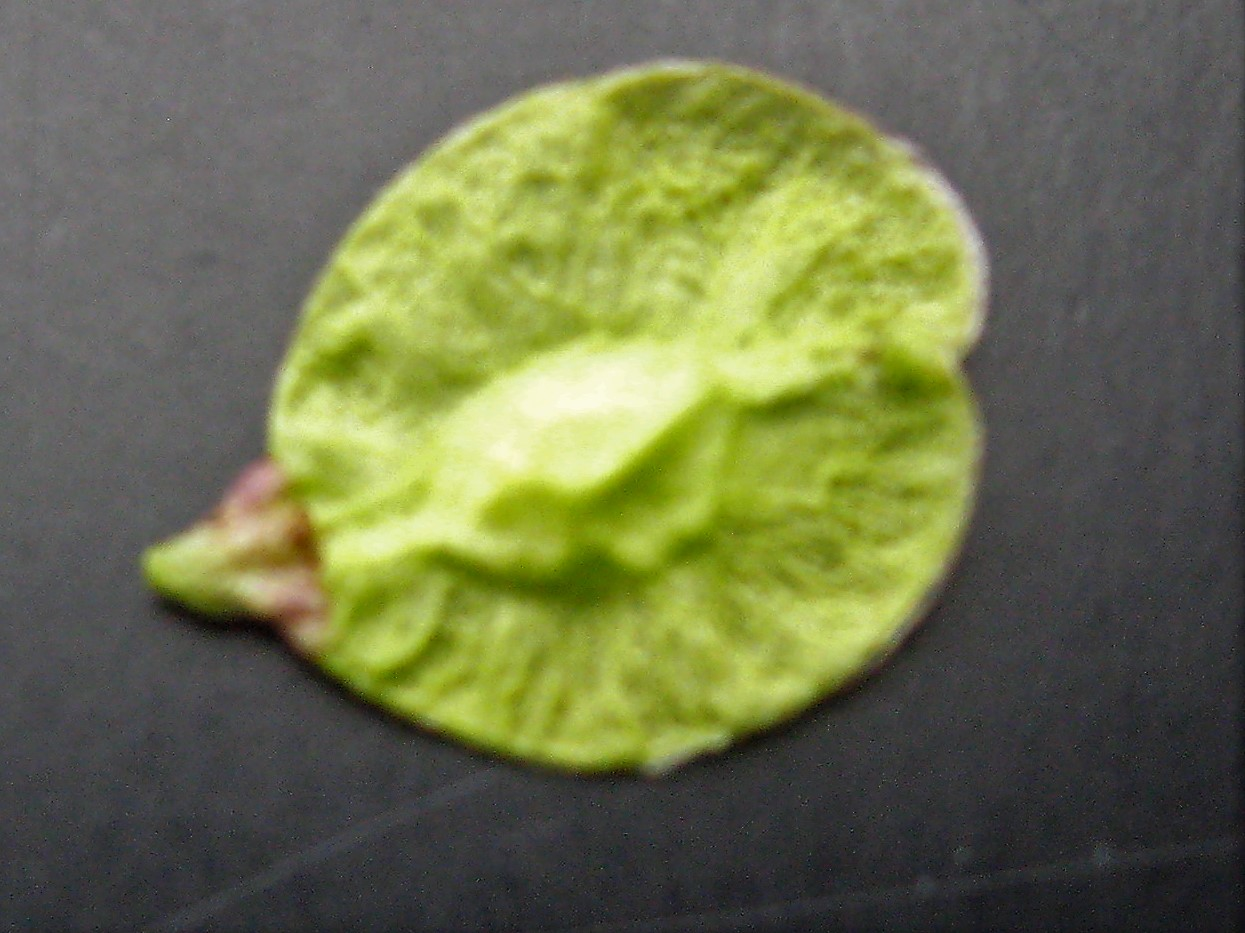
FL025 (glabra x pumila) samara

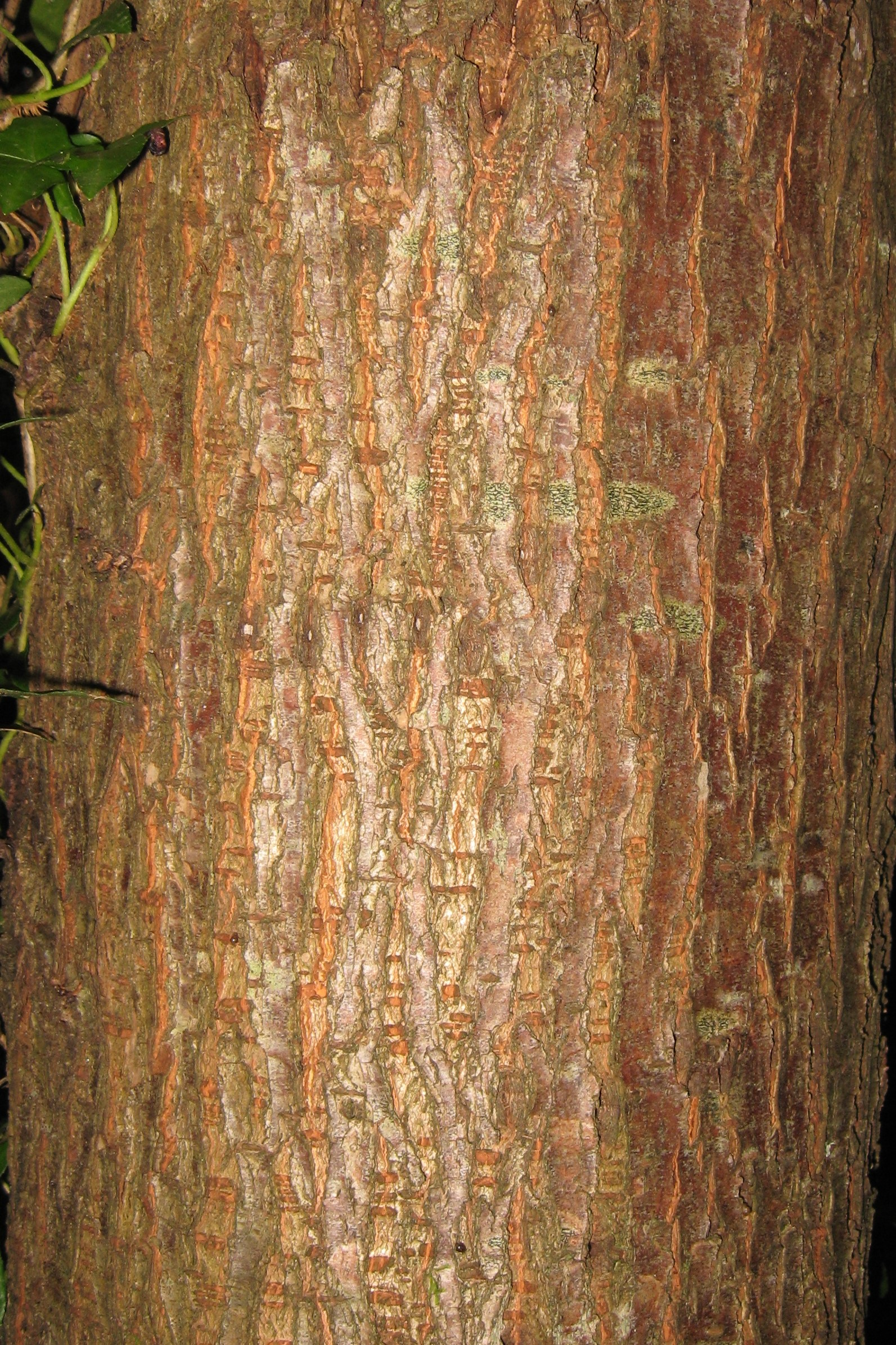
FL025 Bark of Cams Bay tree

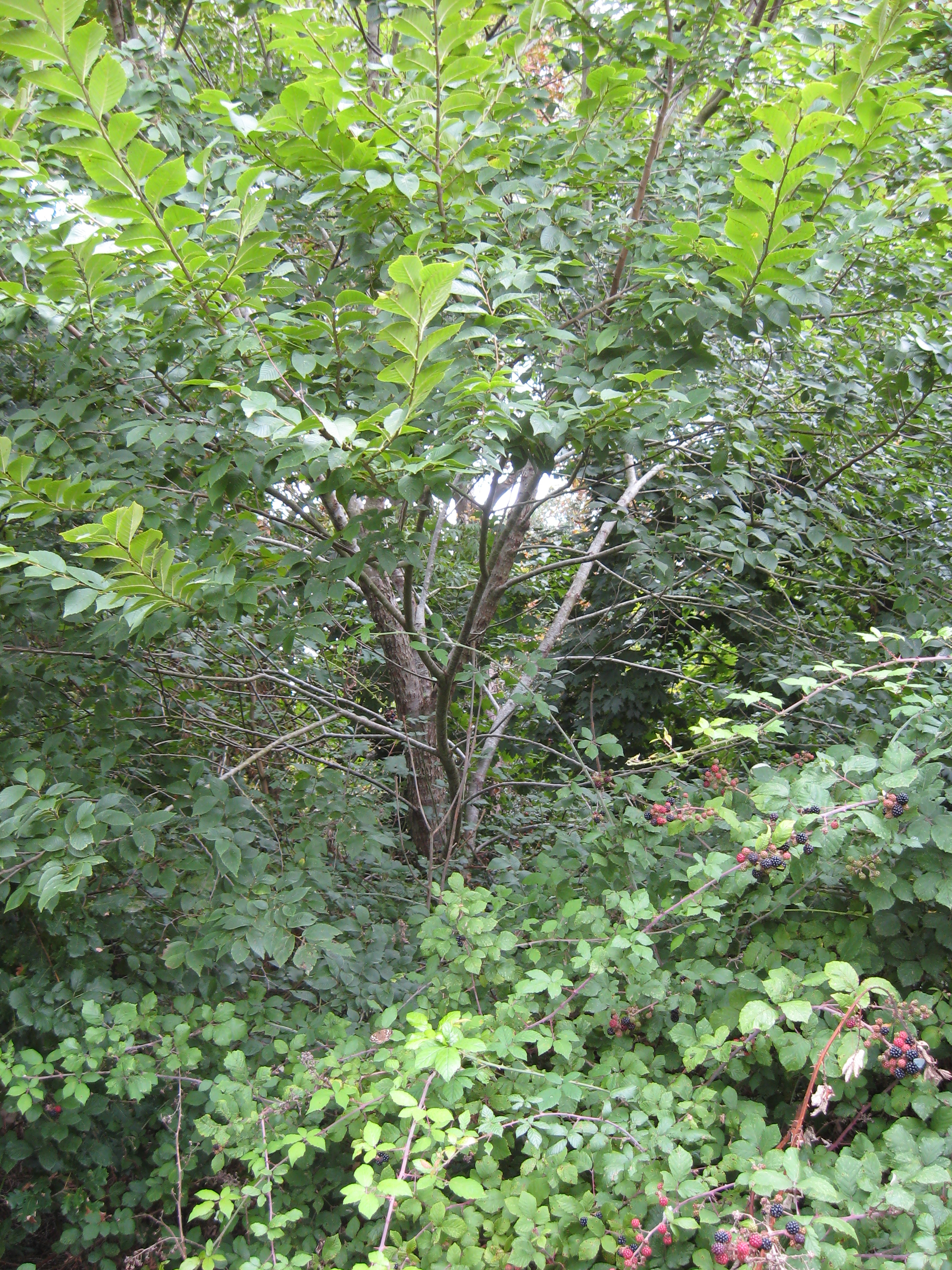
FL025 structure

== Pests and diseases ==
A tree at the Ryston Hall arboretum, Norfolk, listed as Ulmus arbusculata and obtained from the Späth nursery in Berlin before 1914, was killed by the earlier strain of Dutch elm disease prevalent in the 1930s.

== Cultivation ==
The tree was for a short time from 1913 distributed by the Späth nursery, as Ulmus arbuscula E. Wolf, described as "(montana × pumila), ..an as yet uncommon hybrid", a specimen being supplied to Ryston Hall at that time. It does not appear in their post-war catalogues. Another, labelled Ulmus arbuscula Wolf and described as a large tree, stood in the Nymphenburg Palace Park, Munich, in the mid-20th century. Two trees survive in eastern European arboreta (see 'Accessions'). U. × arbuscula is not known to have been introduced to North America or Australasia.

== Accessions ==
Europe

- Butterfly Conservation Hants & IoW Branch elm trials, Cams Bay, Fareham, UK. One specimen of IPP clone 'FL025' planted circa 2005.
- Grange Farm Arboretum, Lincolnshire, UK. Acc. no. 1097 (grown from seed).
- Hortus Botanicus Nationalis, Salaspils, Latvia. Acc. nos. 18093, 18094. Planted 1964, no details available.
- Strona Arboretum, University of Life Sciences, Warsaw, Poland.
