= Ulmus pumila 'Poort Bulten' =

Elm cultivar

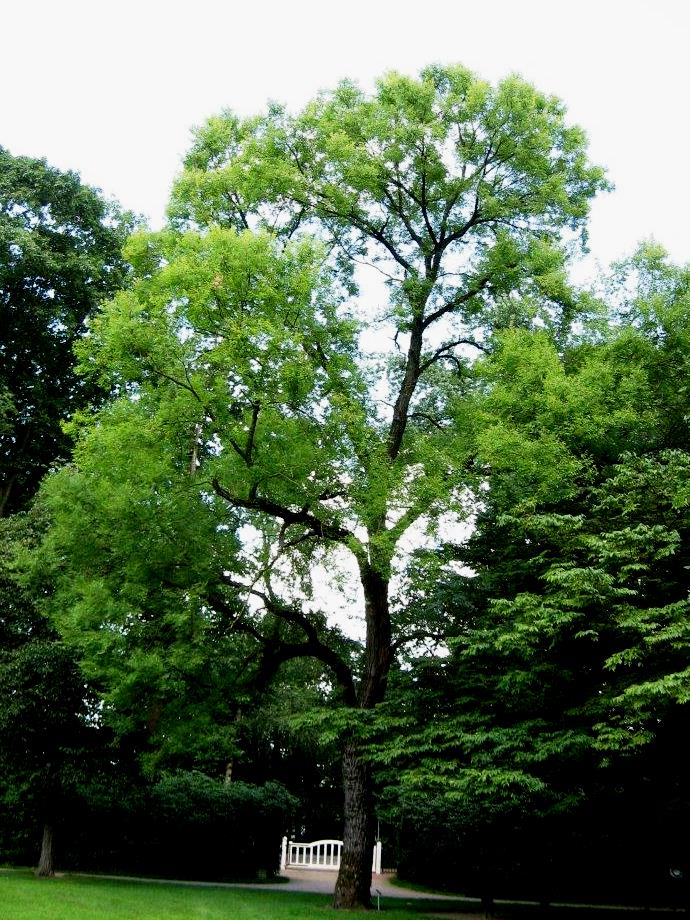
- 'Poort Bulten' at the Arboretum Poort Bulten, Losser, NL
- Species: Ulmus pumila
- Cultivar: 'Poort Bulten'
- Origin: Netherlands

Ulmus pumila, or 'Poort Bulten,' is a Siberian elm cultivar propagated from a tree in Arboretum Poort Bulten in Losser, Netherlands. The original, planted c.1912 by landscape architect Leonard Springer, was included in what was mainly a collection of evergreens, most of which were felled for firewood during World War II. Following a post-war inventory error, for many years the tree was mistaken for Planera aquatica or 'water elm' and commercially propagated under that name. Later research determined it an U. pumila form from Mongolia.

== Description ==
The tree has smaller, paler green leaves than the type, while the trunk has a very rough bark. Planera and Ulmus fruit are easily distinguished, so the identity confusion in Losser suggests that the original specimen was slow to produce seed.

== Pests and diseases ==
See under Ulmus pumila.

== Cultivation ==
Two specimens were planted in Brilhoek (in Hornhof cemetery), Nederhorst den Berg, in 2019, as part of Wijdemeren City Council's elm collection. 'Poort Bulten' is not known to have been introduced to North America or Australasia.

=== Putative specimens ===
A Siberian elm with rough bark and leaves smaller than those of 'Pinnato-ramosa', that remain light green all summer, matching those of 'Poort Bulten', stands near the entrance to Rocheid Path at the northern end of Arboretum Avenue, Edinburgh (2025). Though planted c.1980, the tree does not yet produce fruit.

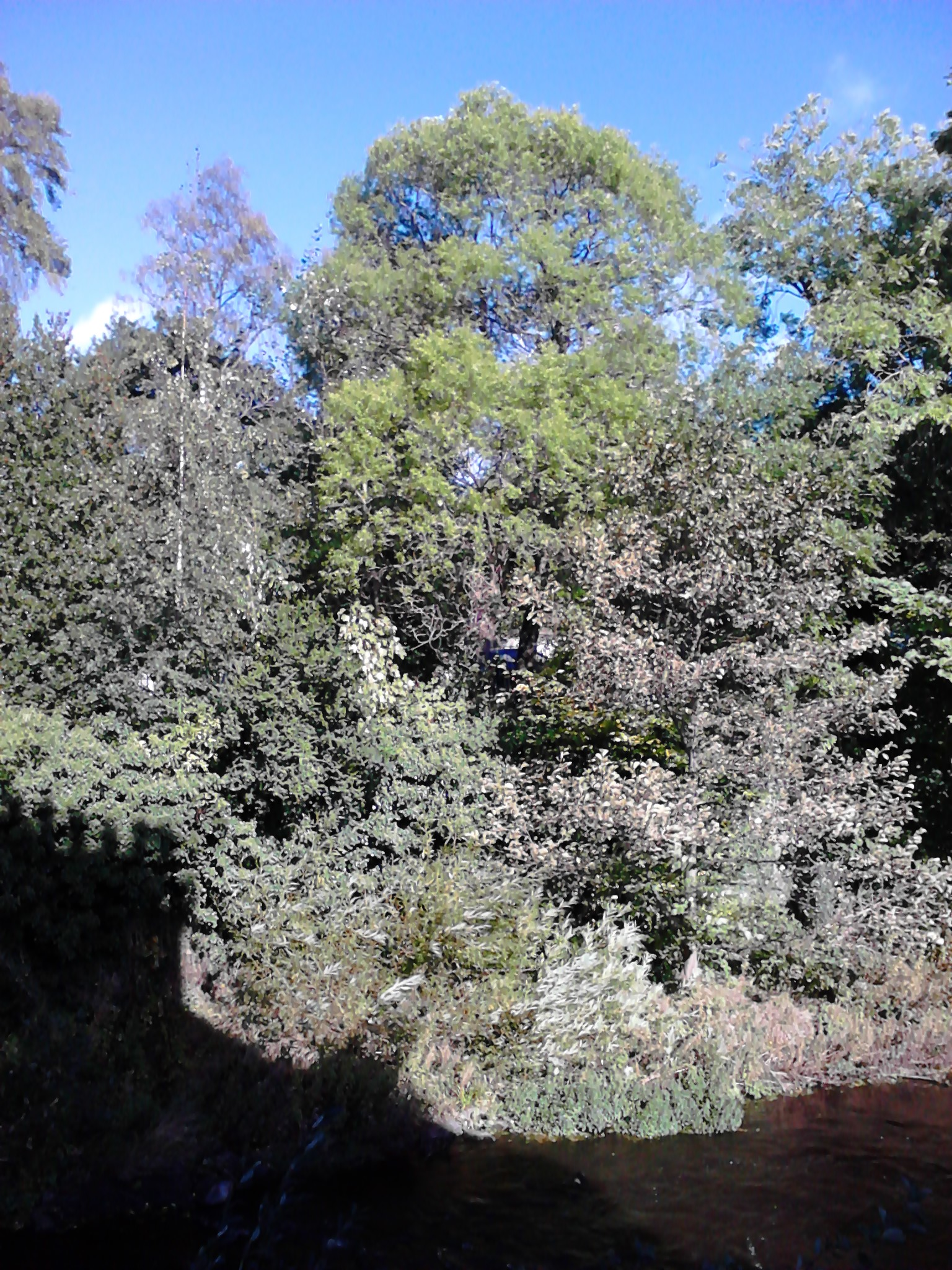
Putative 'Poort Bulten', Edinburgh (2016)

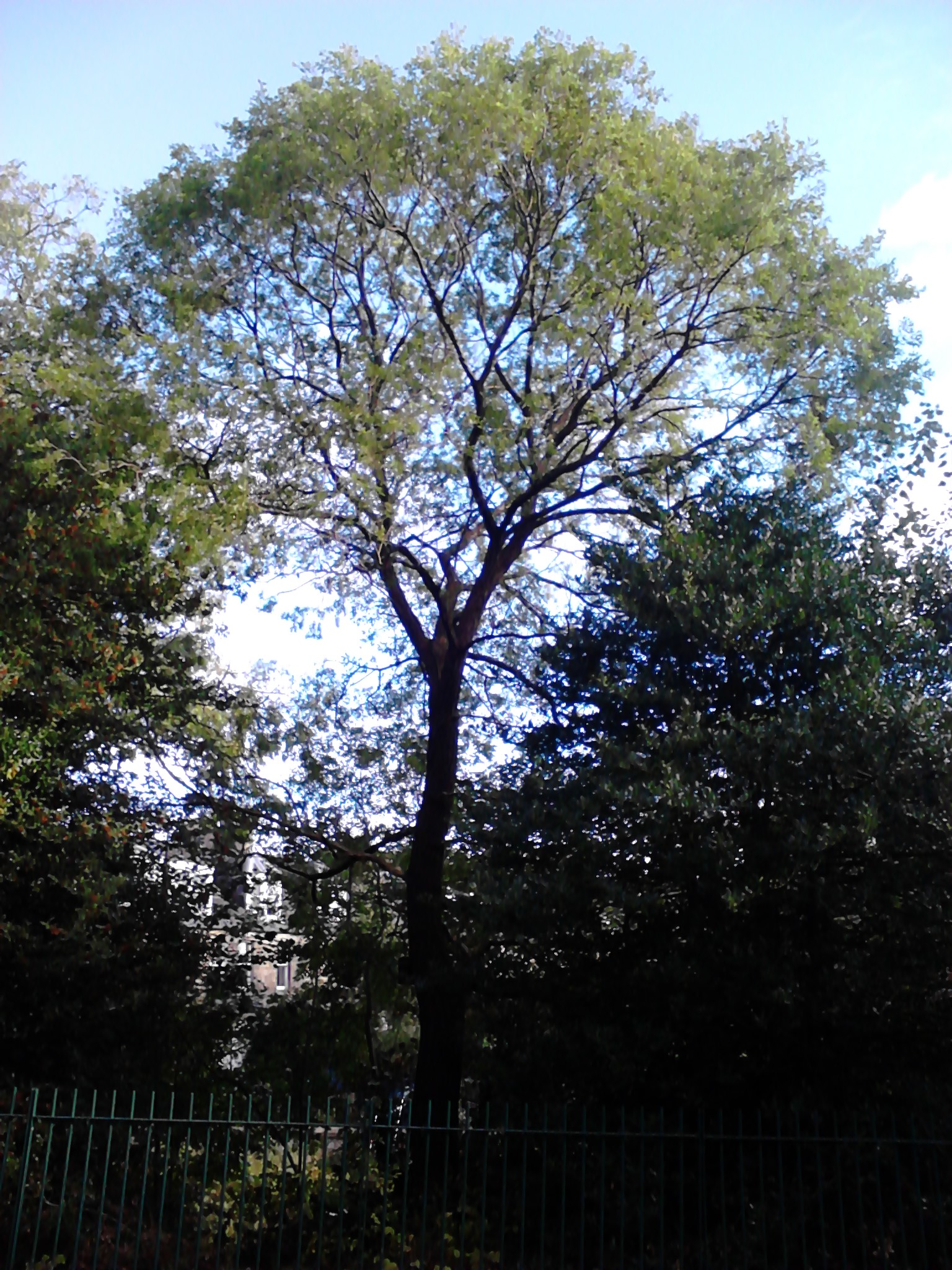
Same tree, from Arboretum Avenue

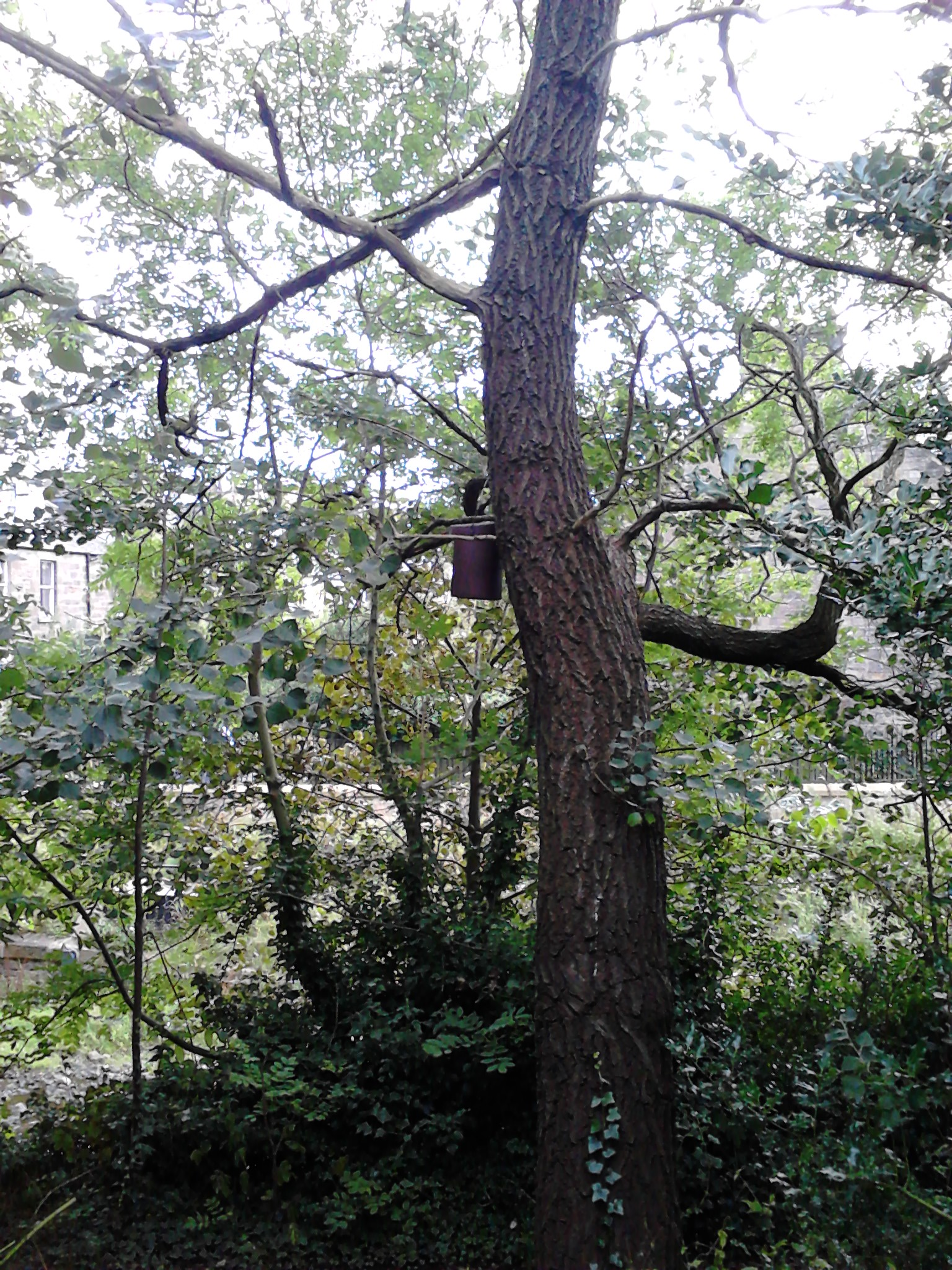
Bole of the same

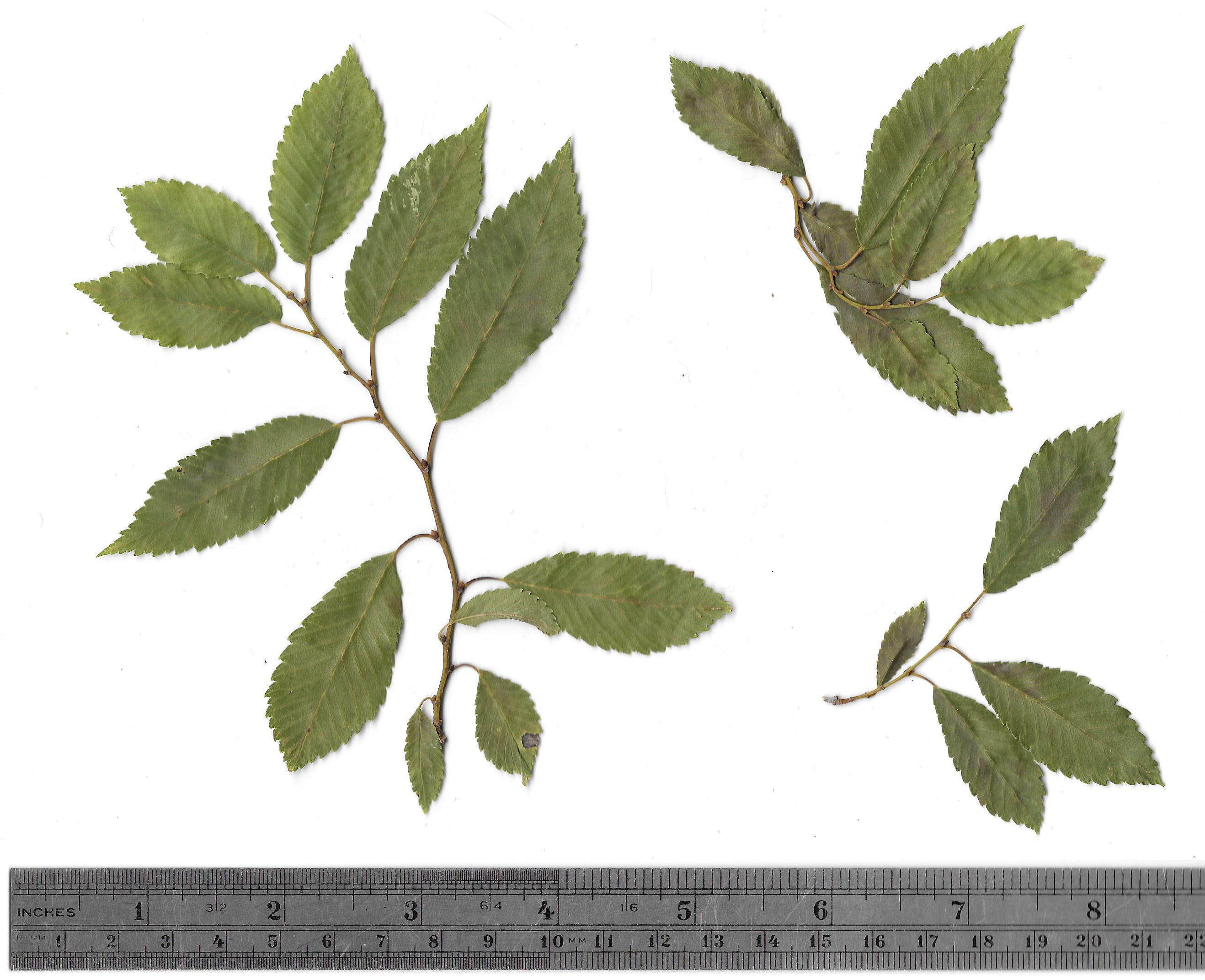
Dried leaves of the same (upper surface; colour faded in pressing)

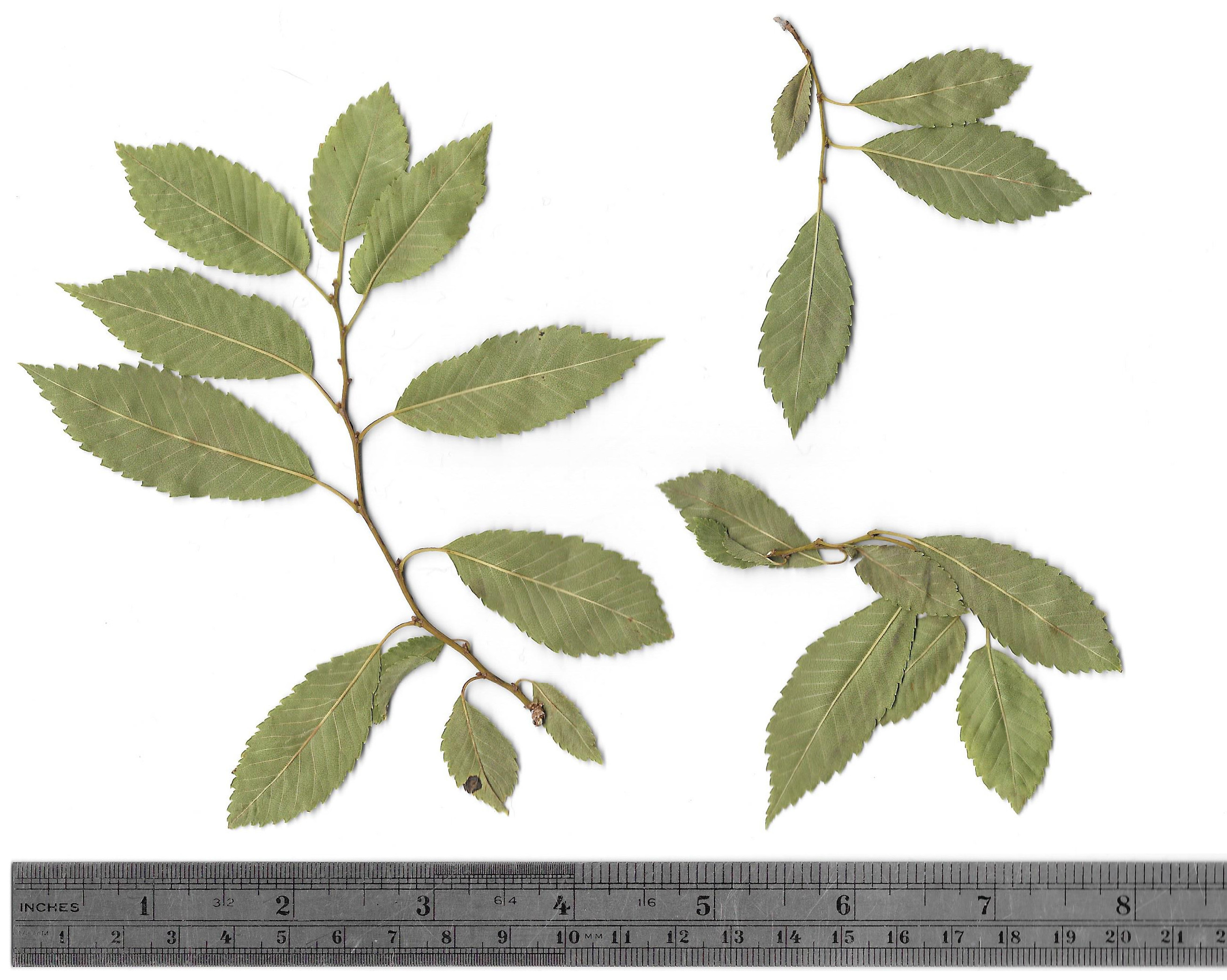
Lower surface

== Notable trees ==
The original still stands (2024). When planted in 1912 it stood among other elms at the back of the park, but following a change of main entrance, it now stands at the front.

== Synonymy ==
- Planera aquatica in error.

== Accessions ==
Europe

- Arboretum Poort Bulten , Acc. no. LOS0252, Losser, Netherlands.

== Nurseries ==
=== Europe ===
- Noordplant , Glimmen, Netherlands.
