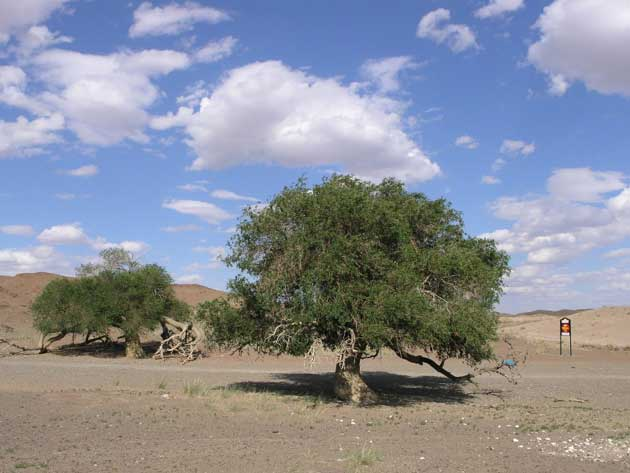
- Gobi Desert of Mongolia

Conservation status
- Least Concern (IUCN 3.1)

Scientific classification
- Kingdom: Plantae
- Clade: Tracheophytes
- Clade: Angiosperms
- Clade: Eudicots
- Clade: Rosids
- Order: Rosales
- Family: Ulmaceae
- Genus: Ulmus
- Species: U. pumila

Binomial name
- Ulmus pumila L.

Synonyms
- Ulmus campestris var. pumila Ledeb.; Ulmus campestris L. var. pumila (L.) Maxim.; Ulmus gobicus Anon.; Ulmus humilis Amman ex Steud.; Ulmus manshurica Nakai; Ulmus microphylla Persoon; Ulmus pumila var. genuina Skvort.; Ulmus pumila var. microphylla Persoon; Ulmus pumila var. transbaicalensis Pallas

= Ulmus pumila =

Species of tree

Ulmus pumila, the Siberian elm, is a tree native to Asia. It is also known as the Asiatic elm and dwarf elm, but sometimes mistakenly called the "Chinese" elm (Ulmus parvifolia). U. pumila has been widely cultivated throughout Asia, North America, Argentina, and southern Europe, becoming naturalized in many places, notably across much of the United States.

== Description ==
The Siberian elm is usually a small to medium-sized, often bushy, deciduous tree growing to 25 m (82 ft) tall, the diameter at breast height to 1 m (3 ft 3 in). The bark is dark gray and irregularly longitudinally fissured. The branchlets are yellowish gray, glabrous or pubescent, unwinged, and without a corky layer, with scattered lenticels. The winter buds are dark brown to red-brown, globose to ovoid. The petiole is 4–10 millimetres (1/4–1/2 inch) and pubescent; the leaf blade is elliptic-ovate to elliptic-lanceolate, 2–8 by 1.2–3.5 centimetres (3/4 in–3 1/8 in × 1/2 in–1 3/8 in), the colour changing from dark green to yellow in autumn. The perfect, apetalous, wind-pollinated flowers bloom for one week in early spring, before the leaves emerge, in tight fascicles (bundles) on the last year's branchlets. Flowers emerging in early February are often damaged by frost (causing the species to be dropped from the Dutch elm breeding programme). Each flower is about 3 mm (1/8 in) across and has a green calyx with four or five lobes, four to eight stamens with brownish-red anthers, and a green pistil with a two-lobed style. Unlike most elms, the Siberian elm is able to self-pollinate successfully.

The wind-dispersed samarae are whitish tan, orbicular to rarely broadly obovate or elliptical, 1 cm–2 cm × 1 cm–1.5 cm (3/8 in–3/4 in × 3/8 in–5/8 in), and glabrous except for pubescence on the stigmatic surface; the stalk is 1–2 mm (5/128–5/64 in), and the perianth is persistent. The seed is at the centre of the samara or occasionally slightly toward the apex, but does not reach the apical notch. Flowering and fruiting occur from March to May. Ploidy: 2n = 28. The tree also suckers readily from its roots.

The tree is short-lived in temperate climates, rarely reaching more than 60 years of age, but in its native environment, may live between 100 and 150 years. A giant specimen, 45 km (28 mi) southeast of Khanbogt in the south Gobi, with a girth of 5.55 m (18 ft 3 in) in 2009, may exceed 250 years (based on average annual ring widths of other U. pumila in the area).

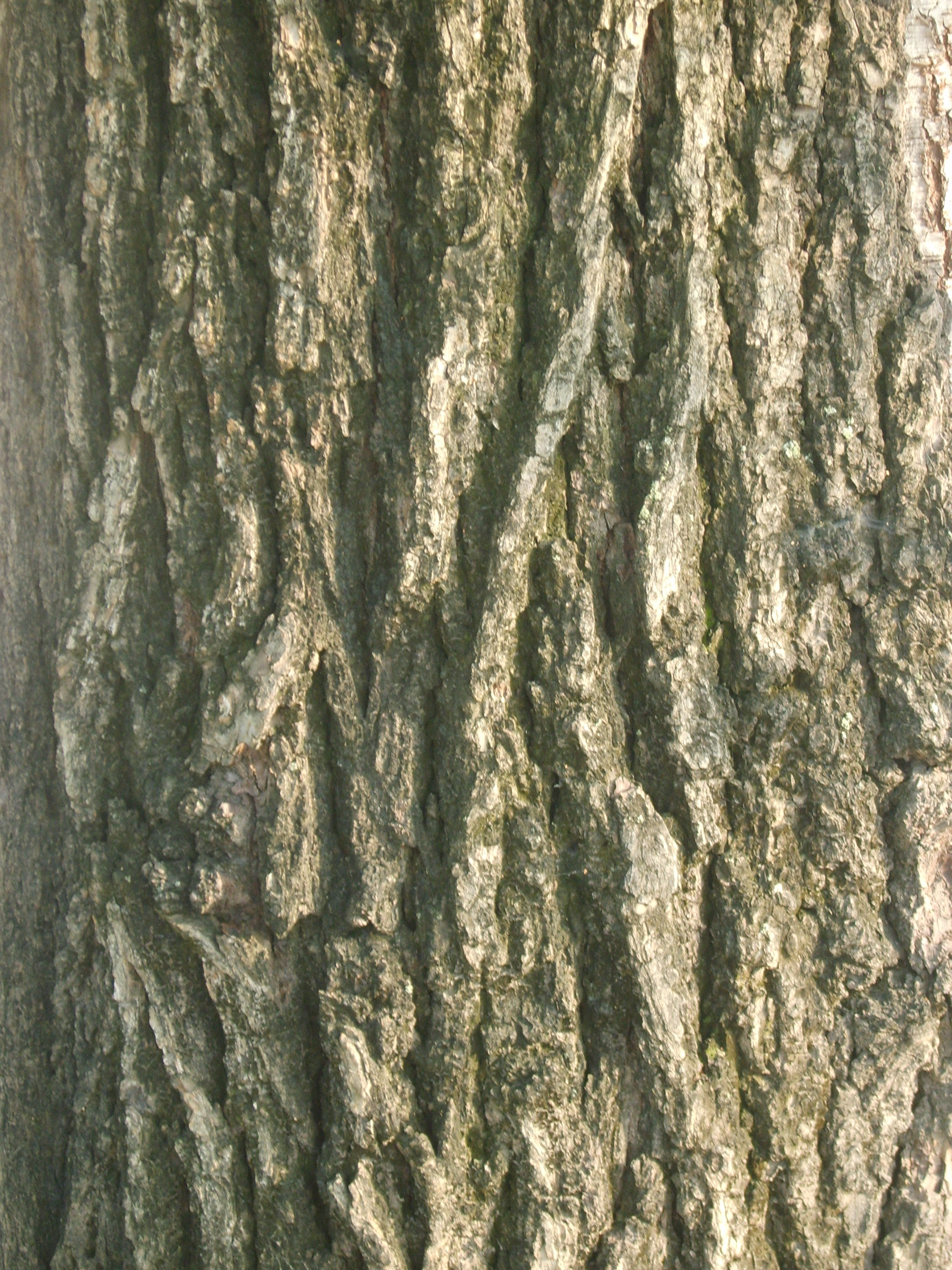
Bark (Korea)

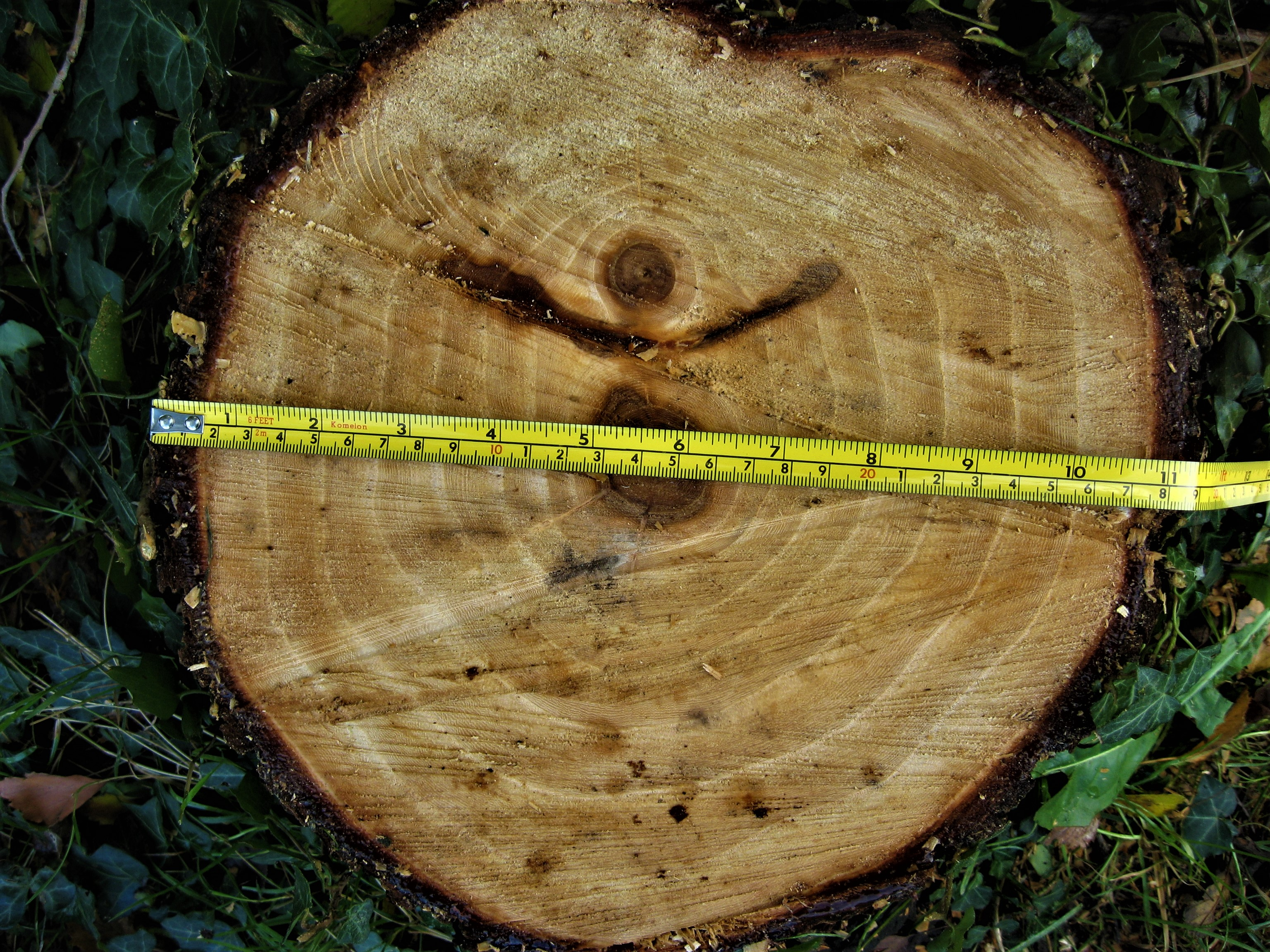
Stump showing rapid stem diameter increase (>40 millimetres (1 1/2 in) per annum)

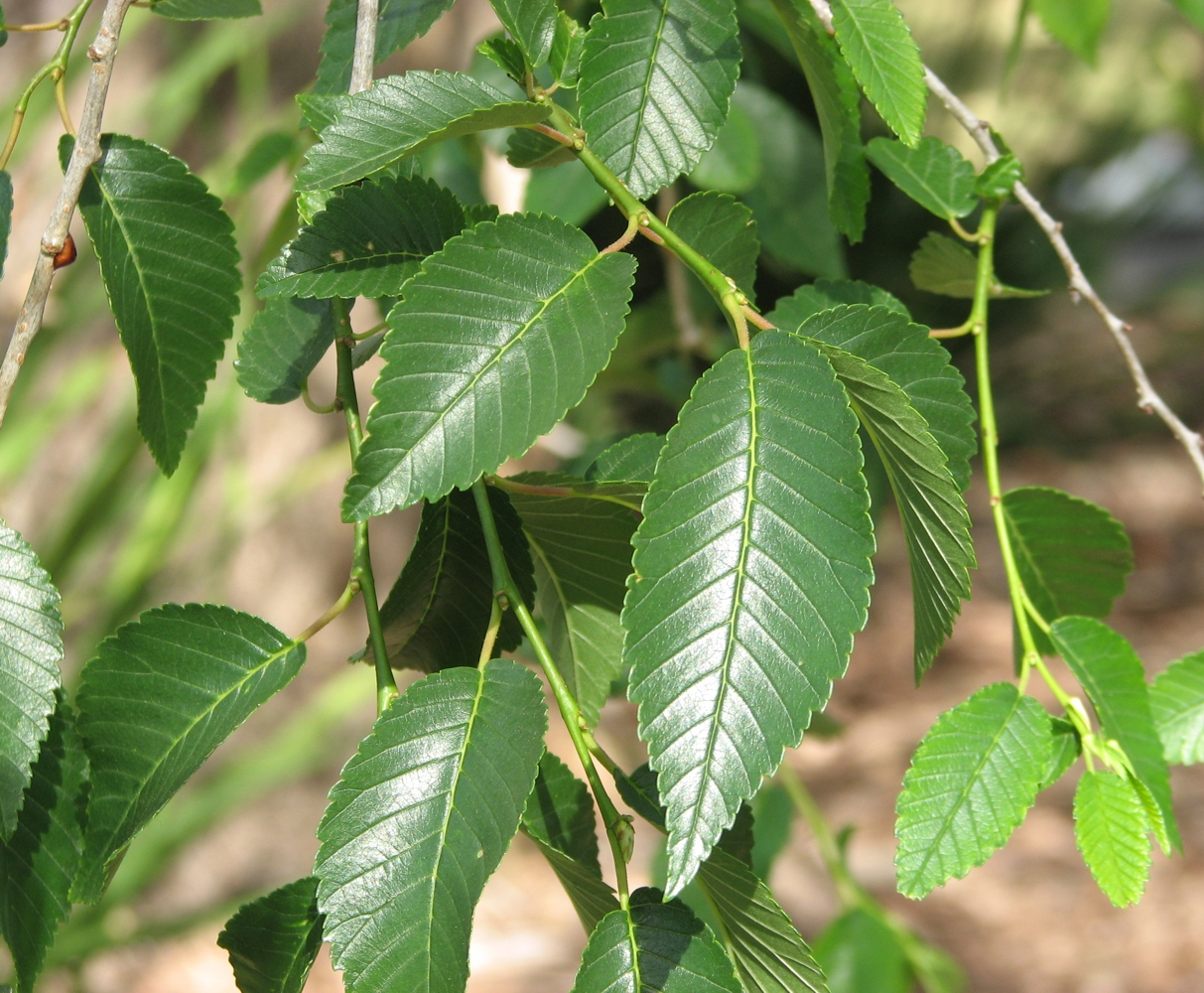
Summer foliage

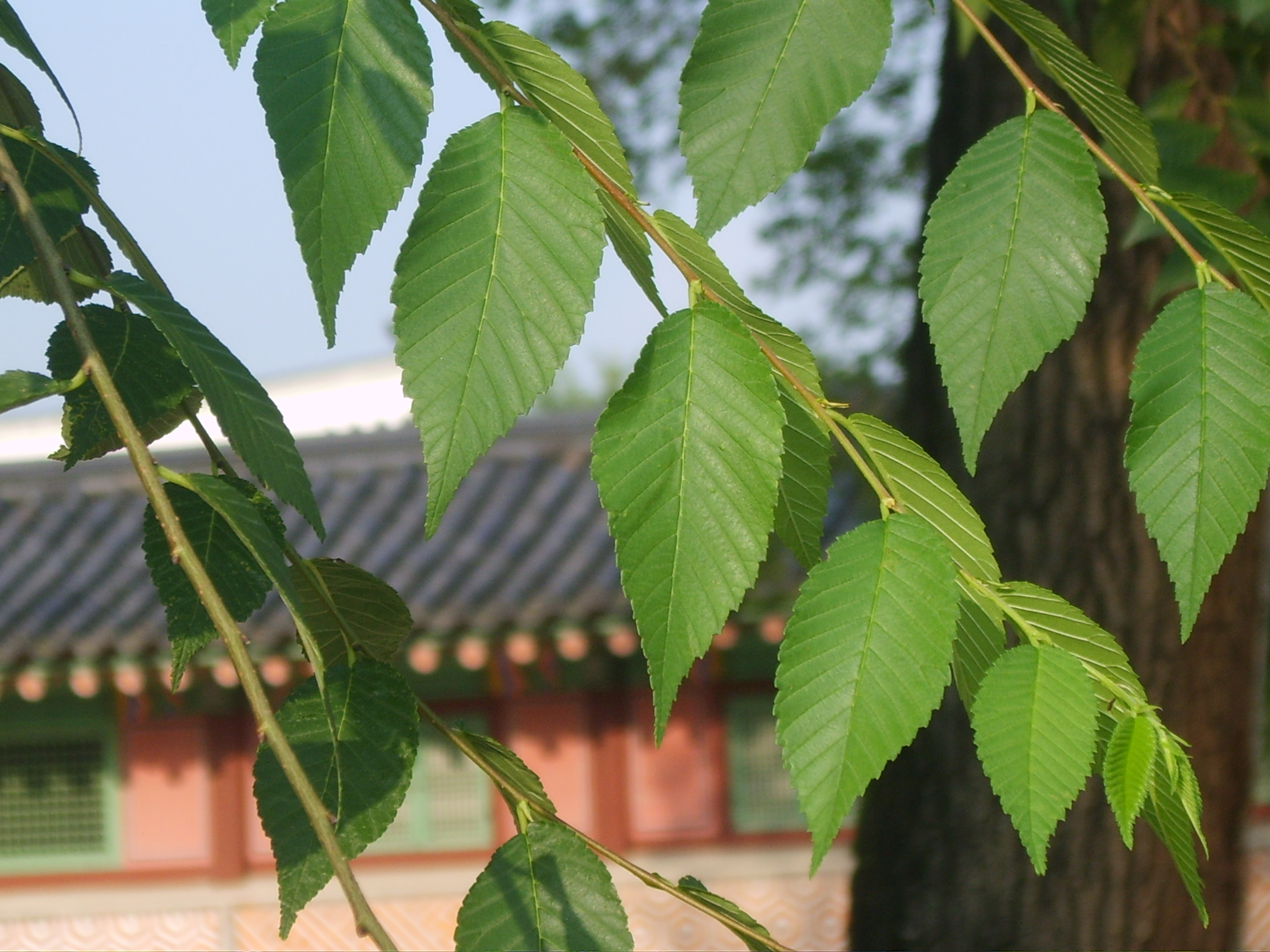
Typical 'long shoots' of pendulous forms

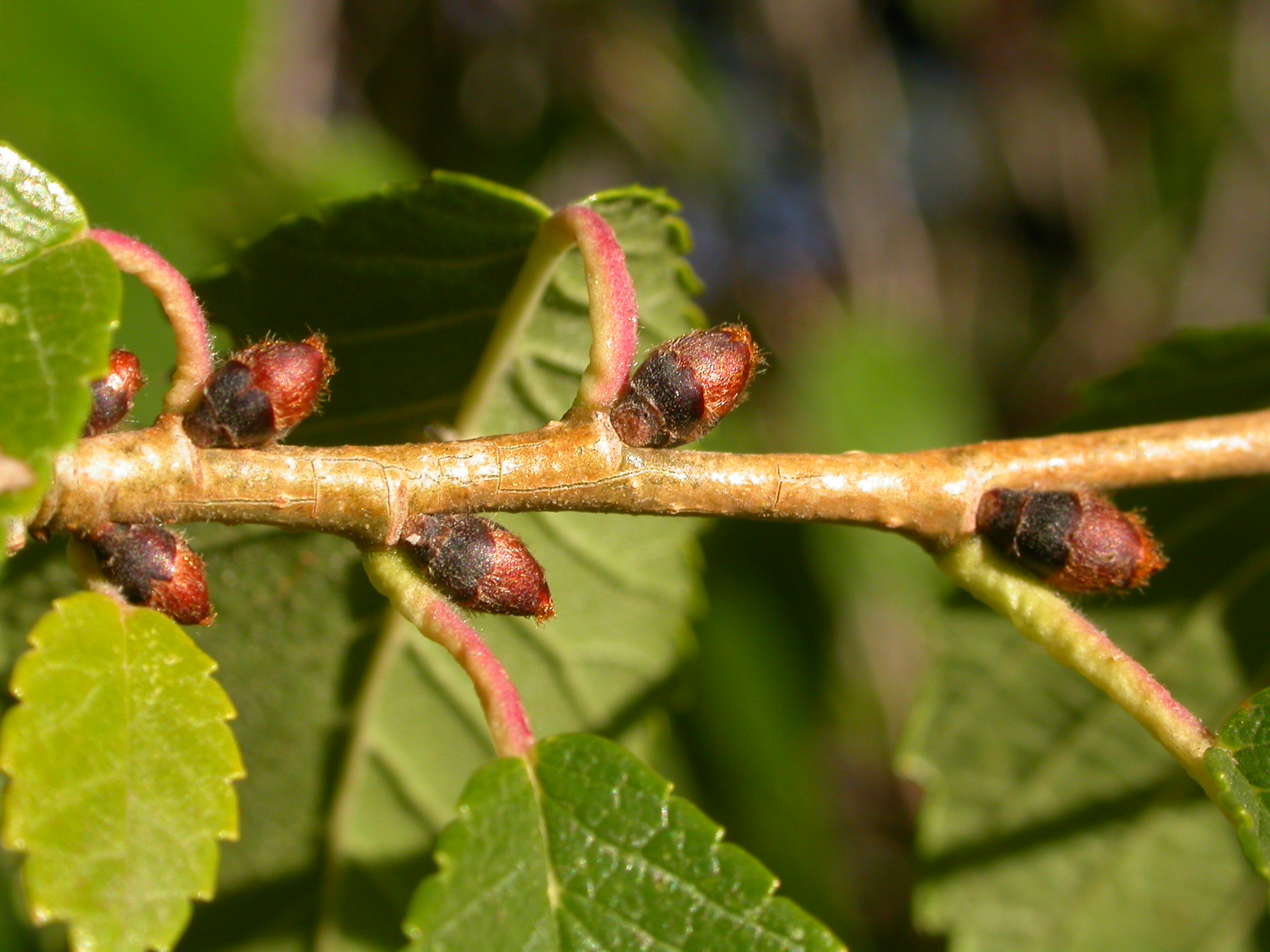
Axil buds and fawn-coloured twigs

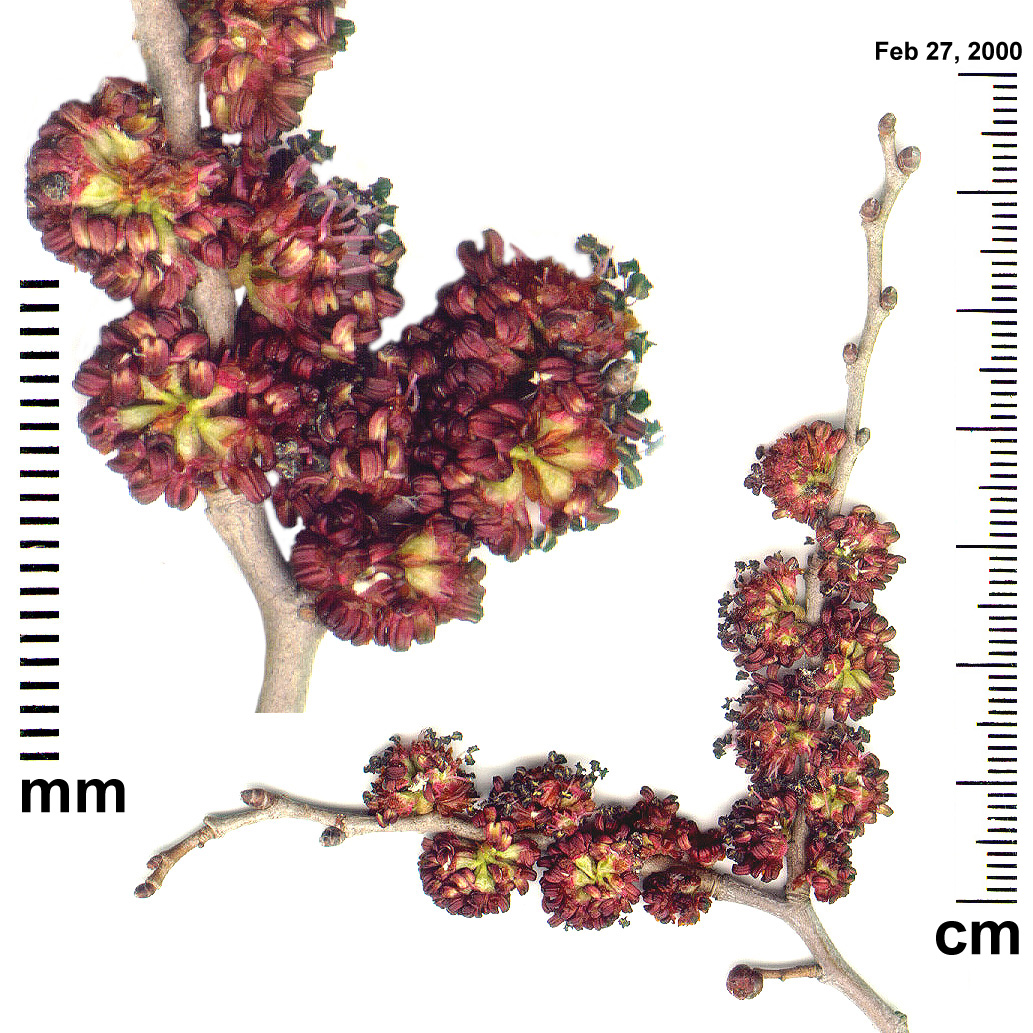
Flowers

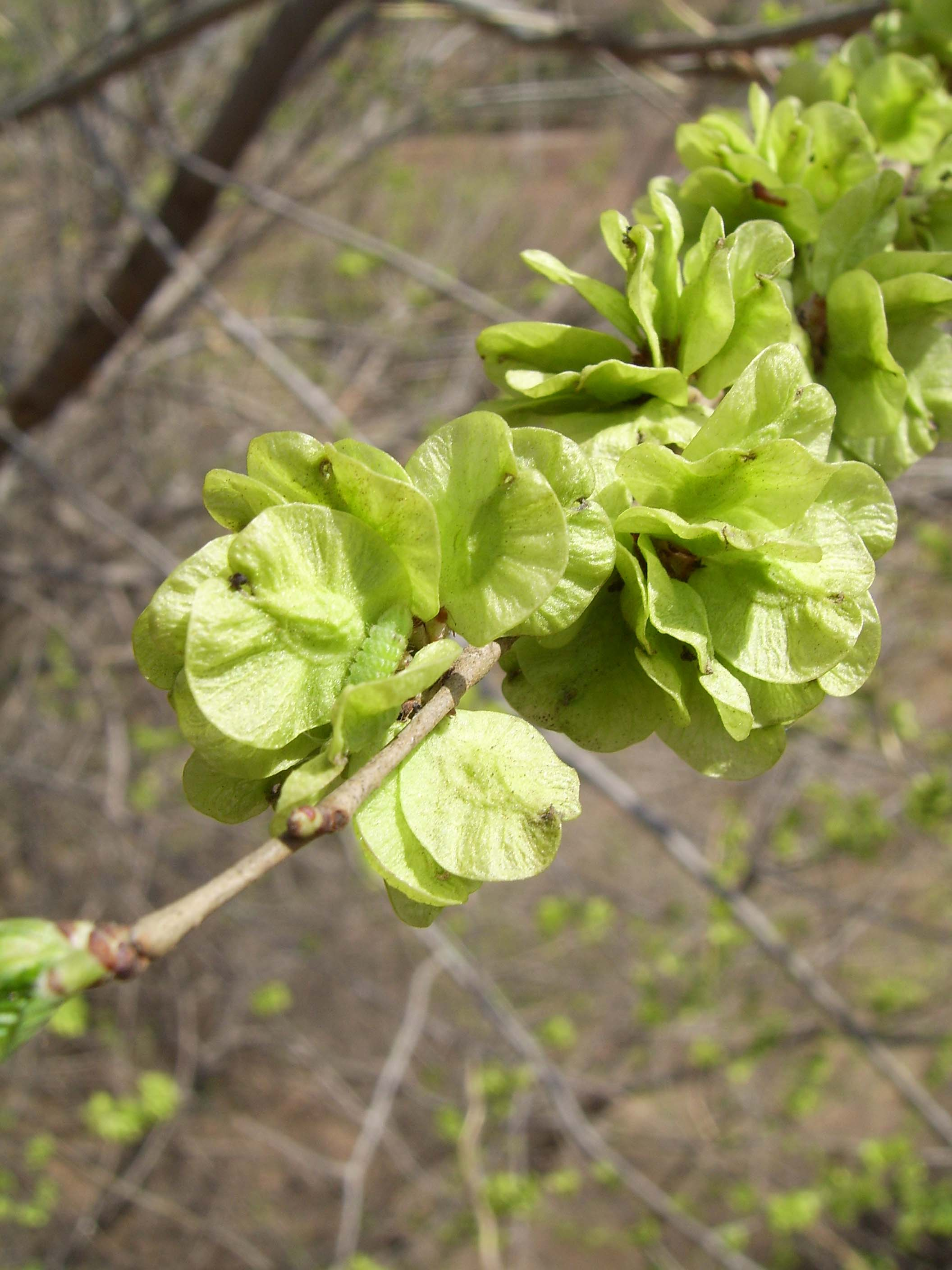
Immature fruits (and Satyrium w-album larva)

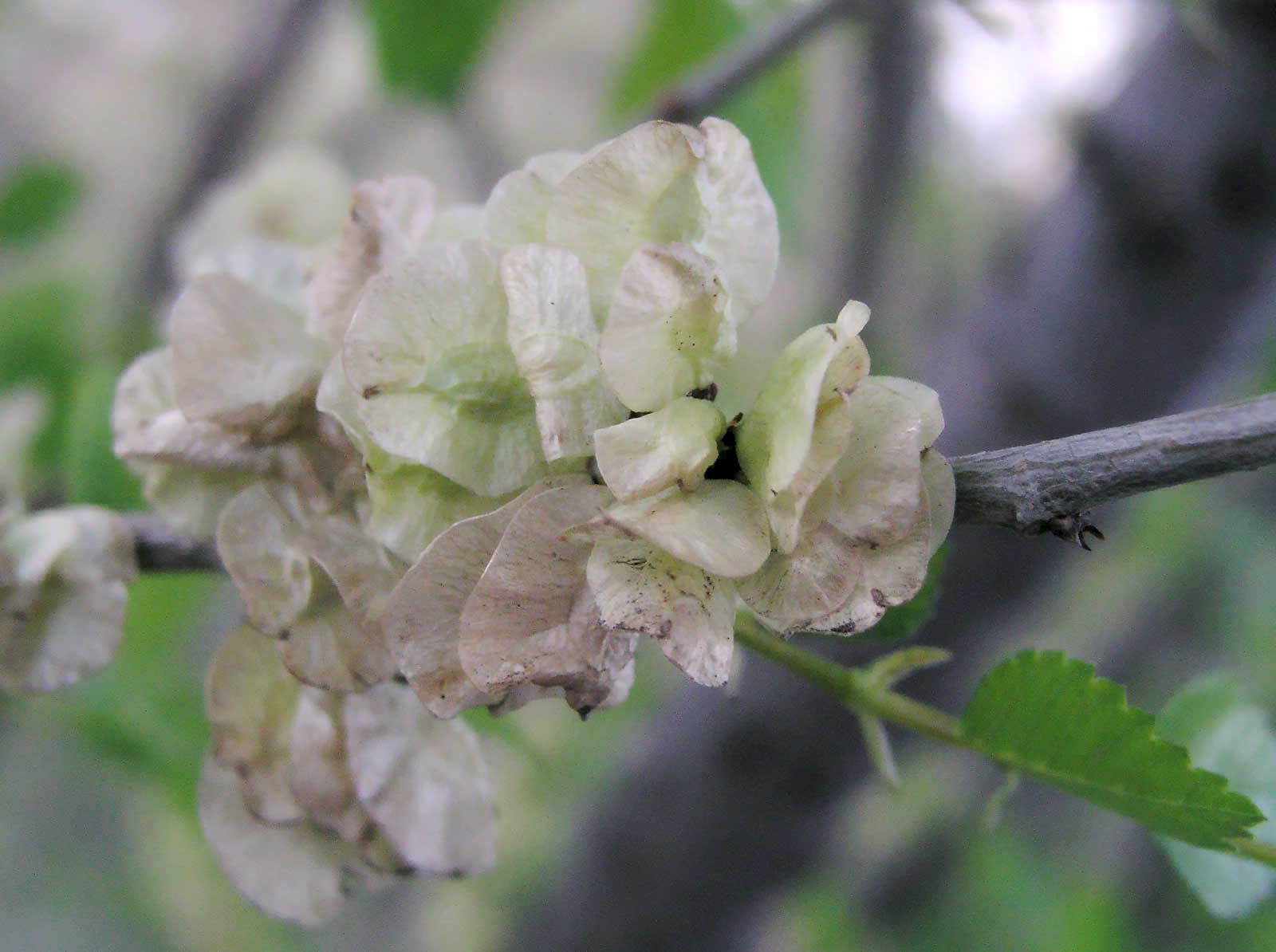
Mature fruits

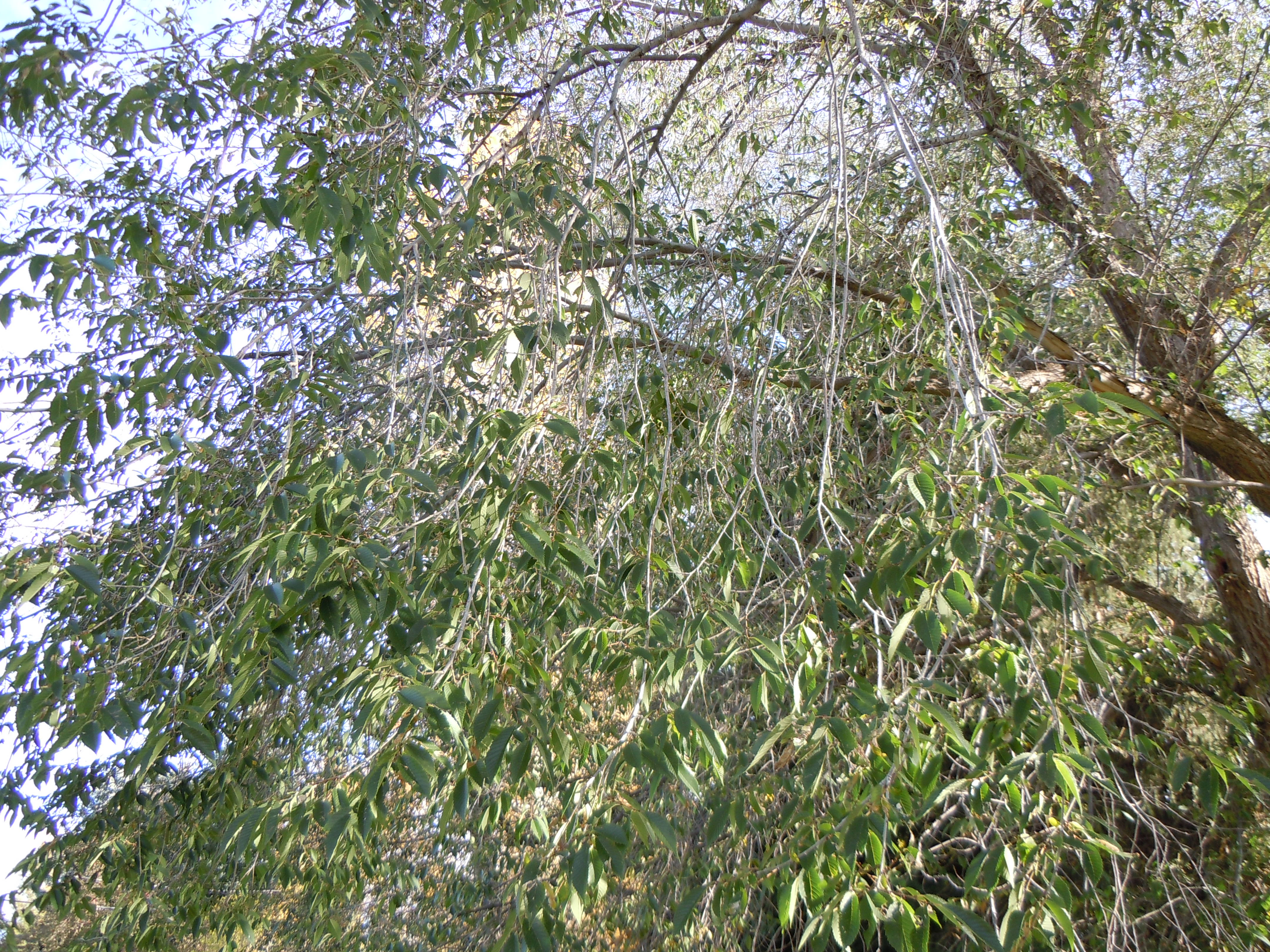
Pendulous branches of some forms

== Taxonomy ==
The species was described by Peter Simon Pallas in the 18th century from specimens from Transbaikal.

Two varieties were traditionally recognized: U. p. var. pumila and U. p. var. arborea, but the latter is now treated as a cultivar, U. pumila 'Pinnato-ramosa'.

== Distribution and habitat ==
The tree is native to Central Asia, eastern Siberia, the Russian Far East, Mongolia, Tibet, northern China, India (northern Kashmir), and Korea. It is the last tree species encountered in the semidesert regions of Central Asia.

== Ecology ==
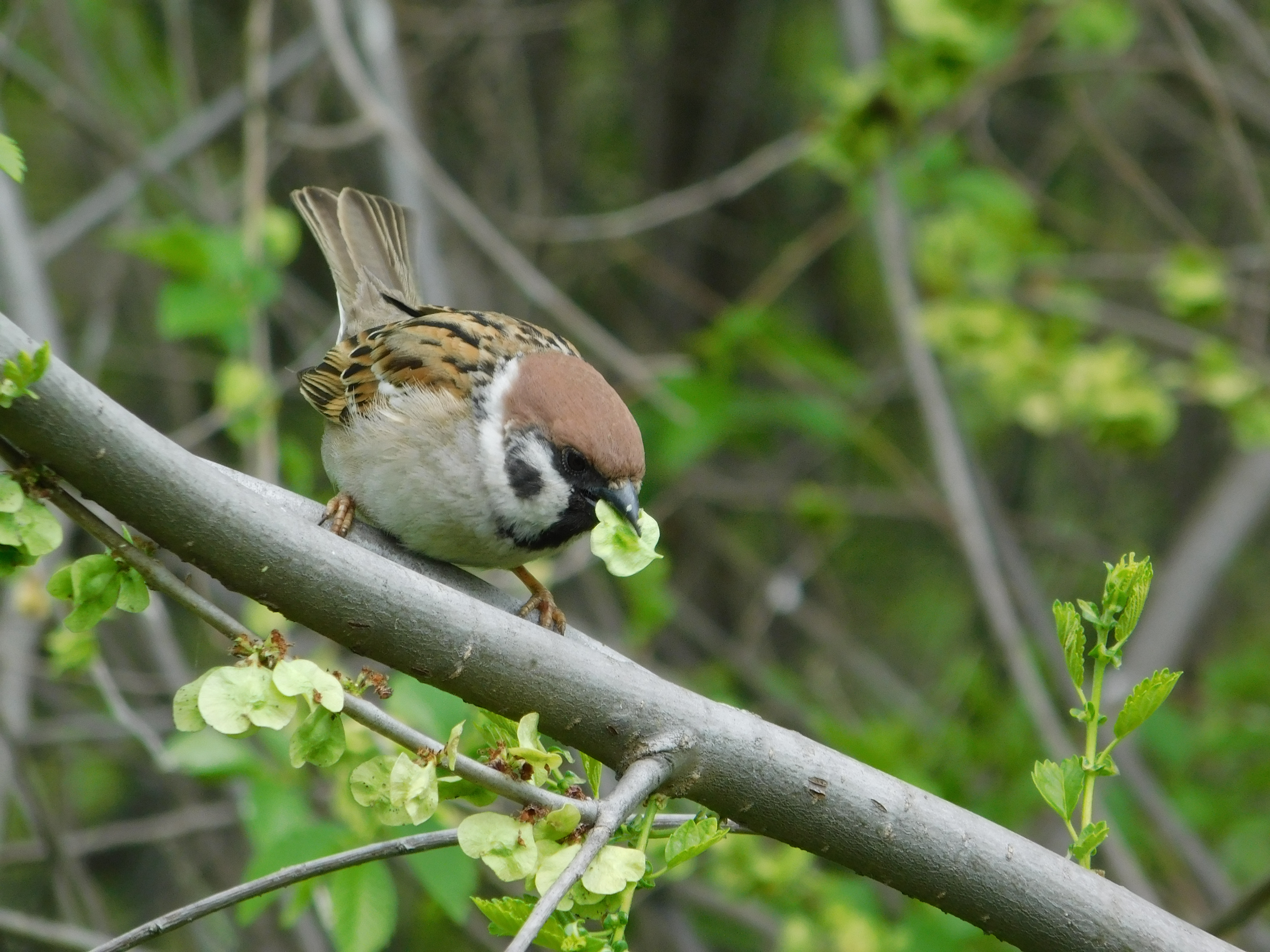
Tree sparrow with seed, Ukraine

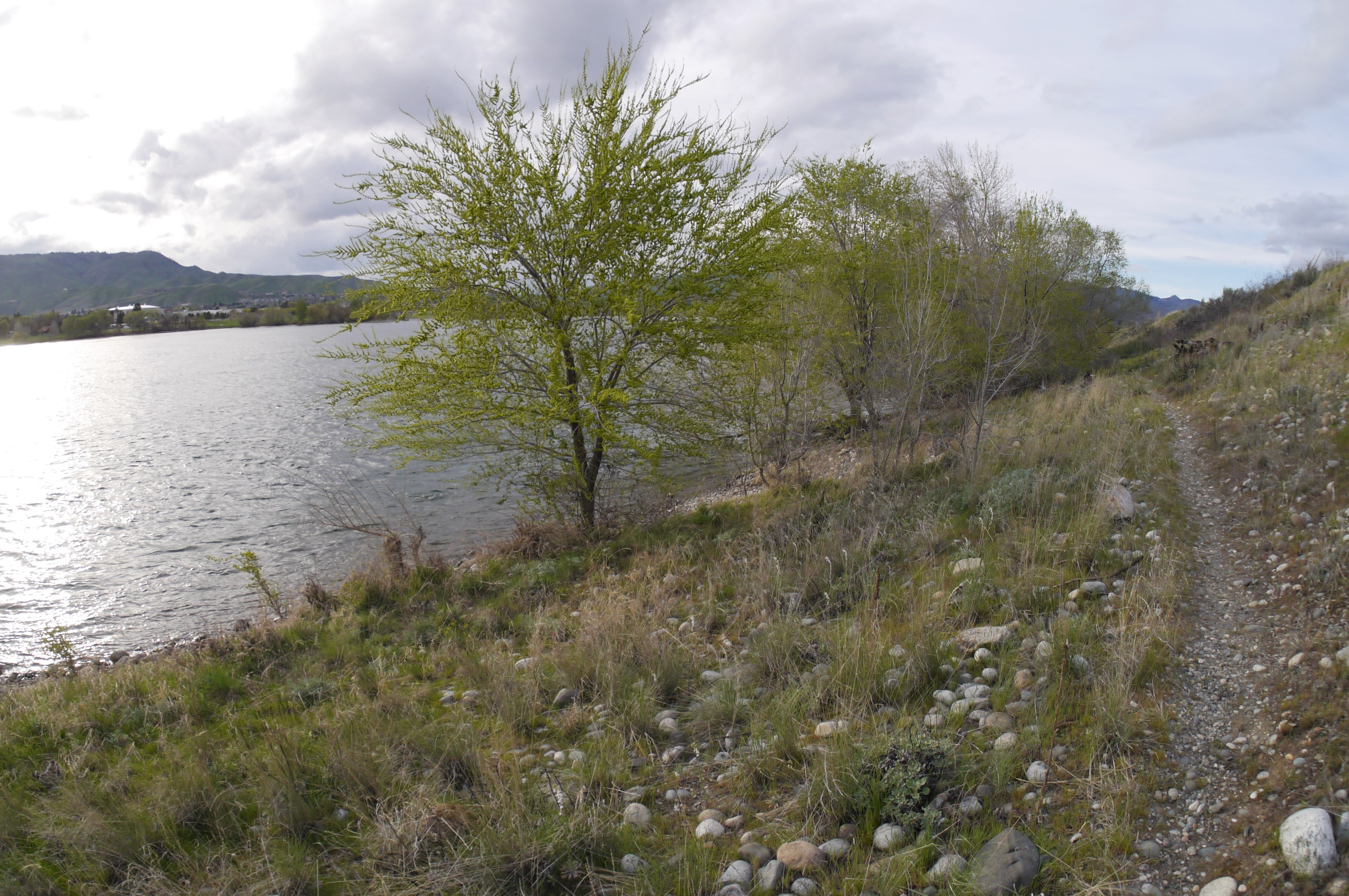
U. pumila spreading along the banks of the Columbia River, Washington, 2013

=== Pests and diseases ===
The tree has considerable variability in resistance to Dutch elm disease; for example, trees from north-western and north-eastern China exhibit significantly higher tolerance than those from central and southern China. Moreover, it is highly susceptible to damage from many insects and parasites, including the elm leaf beetle Xanthogaleruca luteola, the Asian 'zigzag' sawfly Aproceros leucopoda, elm yellows, powdery mildew, cankers, aphids, leaf spot and, in the Netherlands, coral spot fungus Nectria cinnabarina. U. pumila is the most resistant of all the elms to verticillium wilt.

=== Invasiveness and spontaneous hybridization ===
In North America, U. pumila has become an invasive species in much of the region from central Mexico northward across the eastern and central United States to Ontario, Canada. It also hybridizes in the wild with the native U. rubra (slippery elm) in the central United States, prompting conservation concerns for the latter species. In South America, the tree has spread across much of the Argentine pampas.

In Europe, it has spread widely in Spain, and hybridizes extensively there with the native field elm (U. minor), contributing to conservation concerns for the latter species. Research is ongoing into the extent of hybridisation with U. minor in Italy. In the Netherlands, 1700 Siberian elms planted in error for field elm in 2016 in the Zalkerbos near Kampen, Overijssel, were grubbed up because of invasiveness concerns and replaced in 2023 with native species.

U. pumila is often found in abundance along railroads and in abandoned lots and on disturbed ground. The gravel along railroad beds provides ideal conditions for its growth - well-drained, nutrient-poor soil, and high light conditions; these beds provide corridors that facilitate its spread. It is found as high as 8000 feet in the Sandia Mountains in New Mexico and is invading coniferous forest there. New Mexico may be a center of genetic diversity in North America. Owing to its high sunlight requirements, it seldom invades mature forests, and is primarily a problem in cities and open areas, as well as along transportation corridors.

The species is now listed in Japan as an alien species recognized as established in Japan or found in the Japanese wild.

== Cultivation ==
U. pumila was introduced into Spain as an ornamental, probably during the reign of Philip II (1556–98), and from the 1930s into Italy. In these countries, it has naturally hybridized with the field elm (U. minor). In Italy, it was widely used in viniculture, notably in the Po River Valley, to support the grape vines until the 1950s, when the demands of mechanization made it unsuitable.

Three specimens were supplied by the Späth nursery of Berlin to the Royal Botanic Garden Edinburgh (RBGE) in 1902 as U. pumila, in addition to specimens of the narrow-leaved U. pumila cultivar 'Pinnato-ramosa'. One was planted in RBGE; the two not planted in the Garden may survive in Edinburgh, as it was the practice of the Garden to distribute trees about the city. Kew Gardens obtained specimens of U. pumila from the Arnold Arboretum in 1908 and, as U. pekinensis, via the Veitch Nurseries in 1910 from William Purdom in northern China. A specimen obtained from Späth and planted in 1914 stood in the Ryston Hall arboretum, Norfolk, in the early 20th century.

Siberian Elm was propagated and marketed by the Hillier & Sons nursery, Winchester, Hampshire, from 1962 to 1977, during which time over 500 were sold. More recently, the popularity of U. pumila in Great Britain has been almost exclusively as a bonsai subject, and mature trees are largely restricted to arboreta. In the UK the TROBI Champions grow at Thorp Perrow Arboretum, Yorkshire, 19 m (62 ft 4 in) × 70 cm (2 ft 4 in) in 2004, and at St Ann's Well Gardens, Hove, Sussex 20 m (65 ft 7 in) × 60 cm (2 ft 0 in) in 2009.

U. pumila is said to have been introduced to the US in 1905 by Prof. John George Jack, and later by Frank Nicholas Meyer, though 'Siberian elm' appears in some 19th-century US nursery catalogues. The tree was cultivated at the United States Department of Agriculture (USDA) Experimental Station at Mandan, North Dakota, where it flourished. It was consequently selected by the USDA for planting in shelter belts across the prairies in the aftermath of the Dustbowl disasters, where its rapid growth and tolerance for drought and cold initially made it a great success. However, the species later proved susceptible to numerous maladies. Attempts to find a more suitable cultivar were initiated in 1997 by the Plant Materials Center of the USDA, which established experimental plantations at Akron, Colorado, and Sidney, Nebraska. The study, no. 201041K, was to conclude in 2020. The US National Champion, measuring 33.5 m (109 ft 11 in) high in 2011, grows in Berrien County, Michigan. Siberian elm was also introduced to Canada, among notable plantings being a 1 km avenue of some 130 U. pumila planted in the mid-20th century, spanning nine blocks of East 6th Avenue, Vancouver (2025).

The seeds lose their viability rapidly after maturity unless placed on suitable germination conditions or dried and placed at low temperatures. The species has a high sunlight requirement and is not shade-tolerant; with adequate light, it exhibits rapid growth. The tree is also fairly intolerant of wet ground conditions, growing better on well-drained soils. While it is very resistant to drought and severe cold, and able to grow on poor soils, its short period of dormancy, flowering early in spring followed by continuous growth until the first frosts of autumn, renders it vulnerable to frost damage.

As an ornamental, U. pumila is a very poor tree, tending to be short-lived, with brittle wood and poor crown shape, but it has nevertheless enjoyed some popularity owing to its rapid growth and provision of shade. The Siberian elm has been described as "one of the world's worst... ornamental trees that does not deserve to be planted anywhere". Yet in the US during the 1950s, the tree was also widely promoted as a fast-growing hedging substitute for privet, and as a consequence is now commonly found in nearly all states.

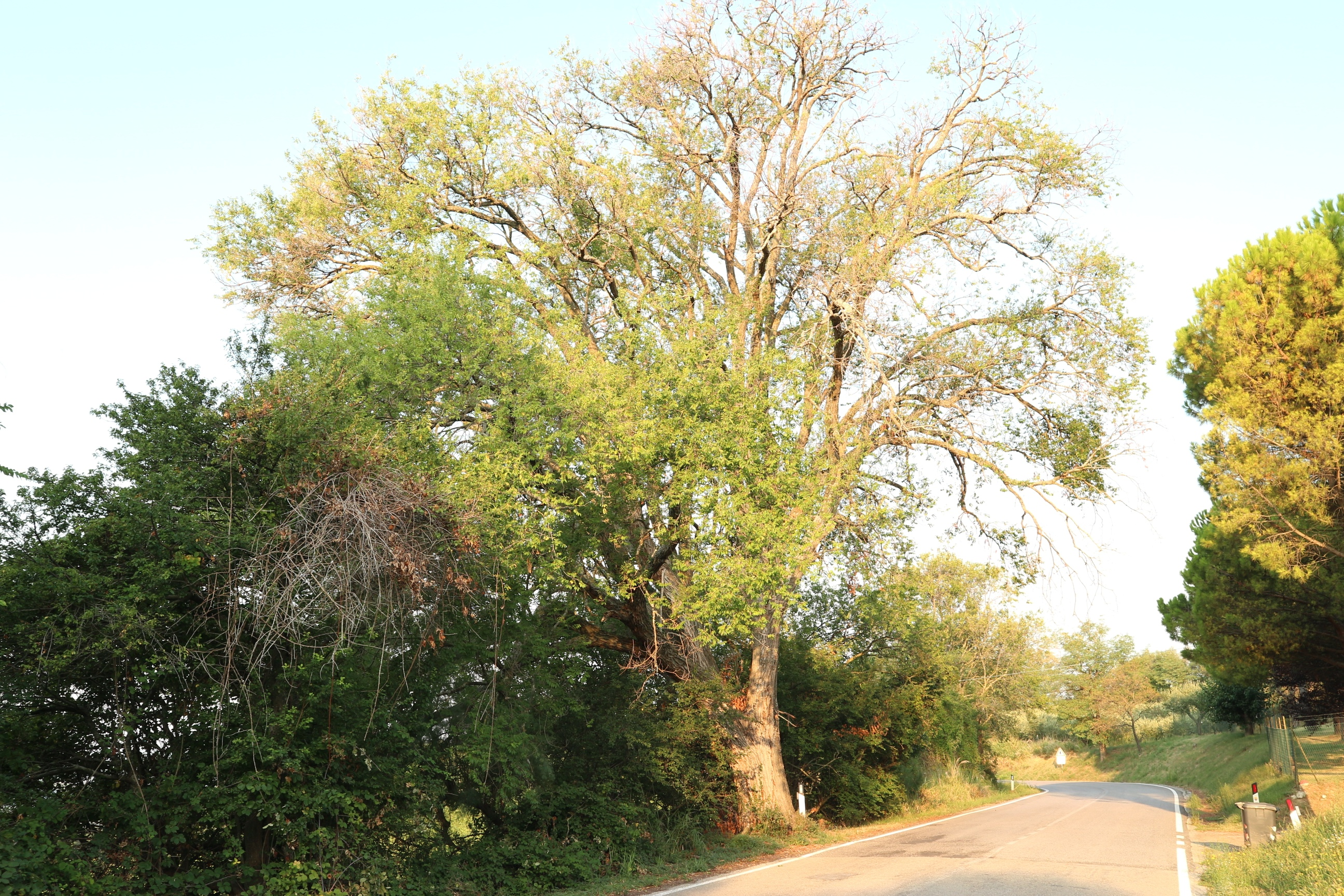
Siberian elm, Pesaro, Italy (2019)

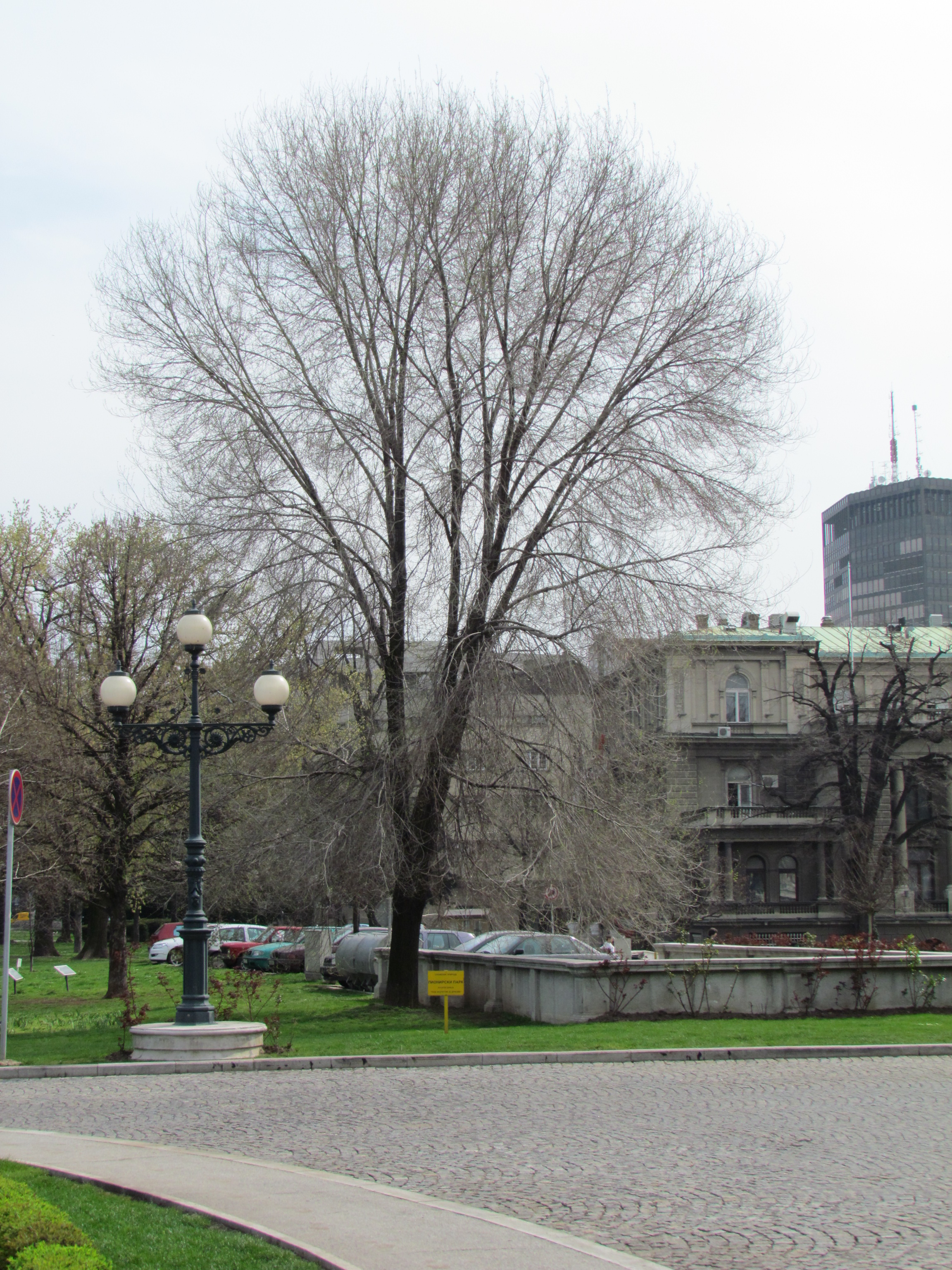
Cultivated form, Pioneers Park, Belgrade

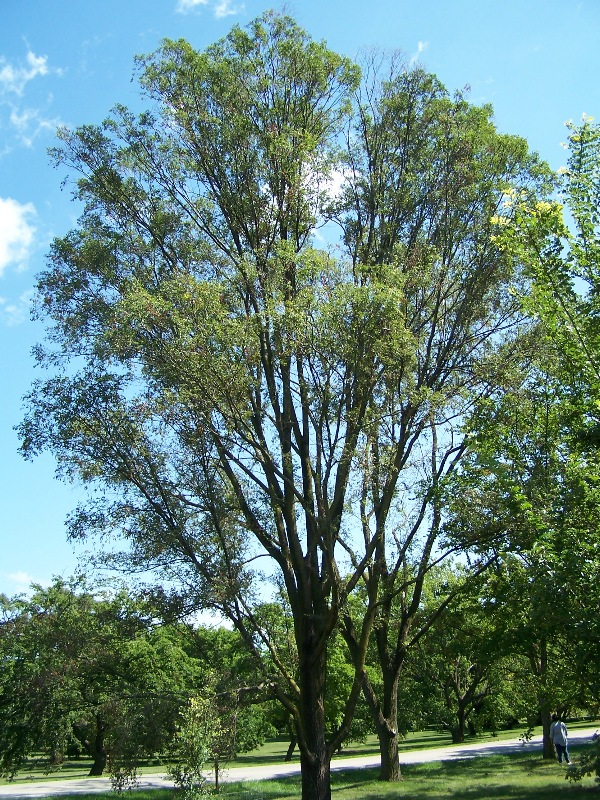
Typical cultivated specimen, Morton Arboretum

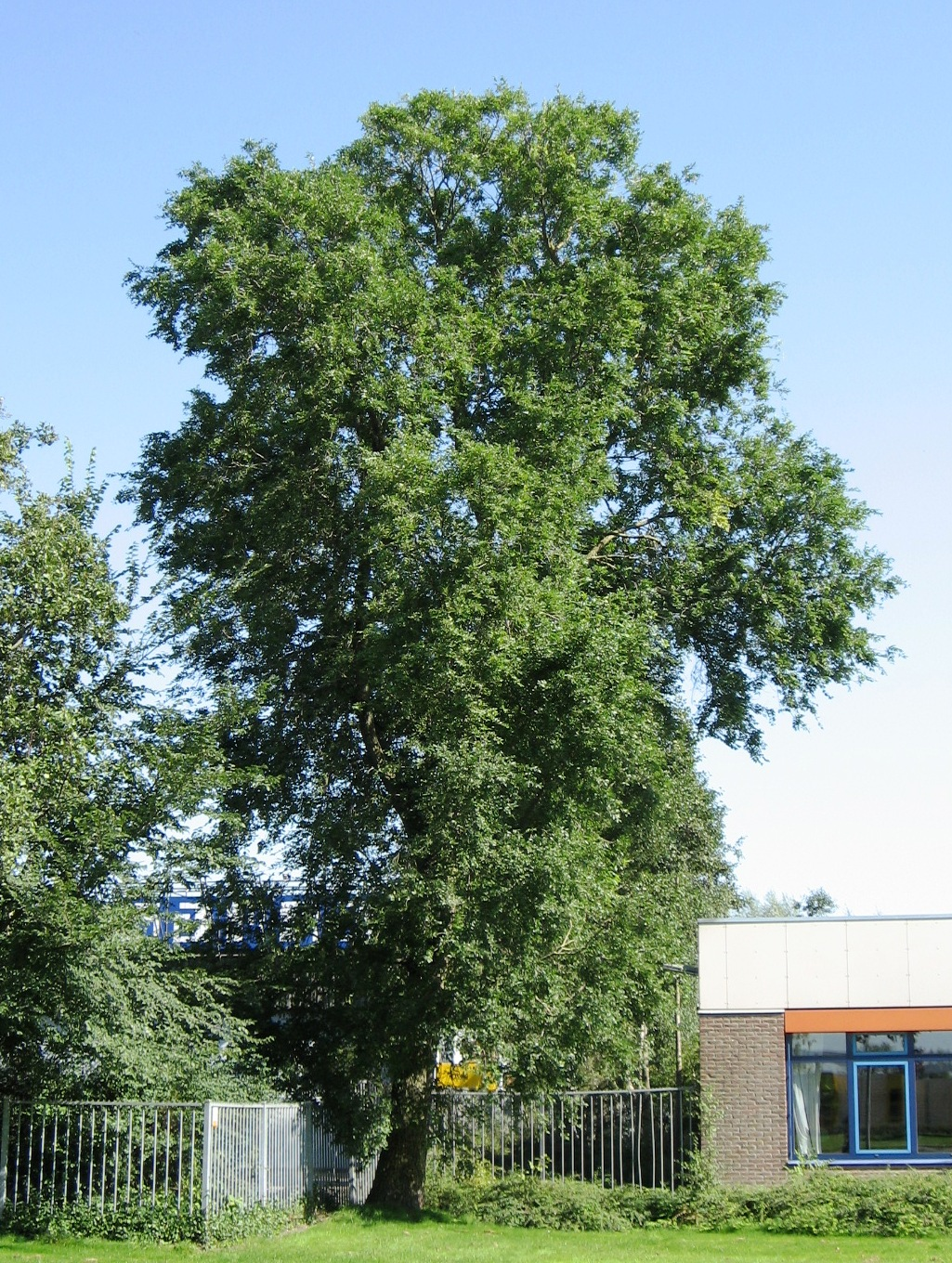
Compact form, Groningen

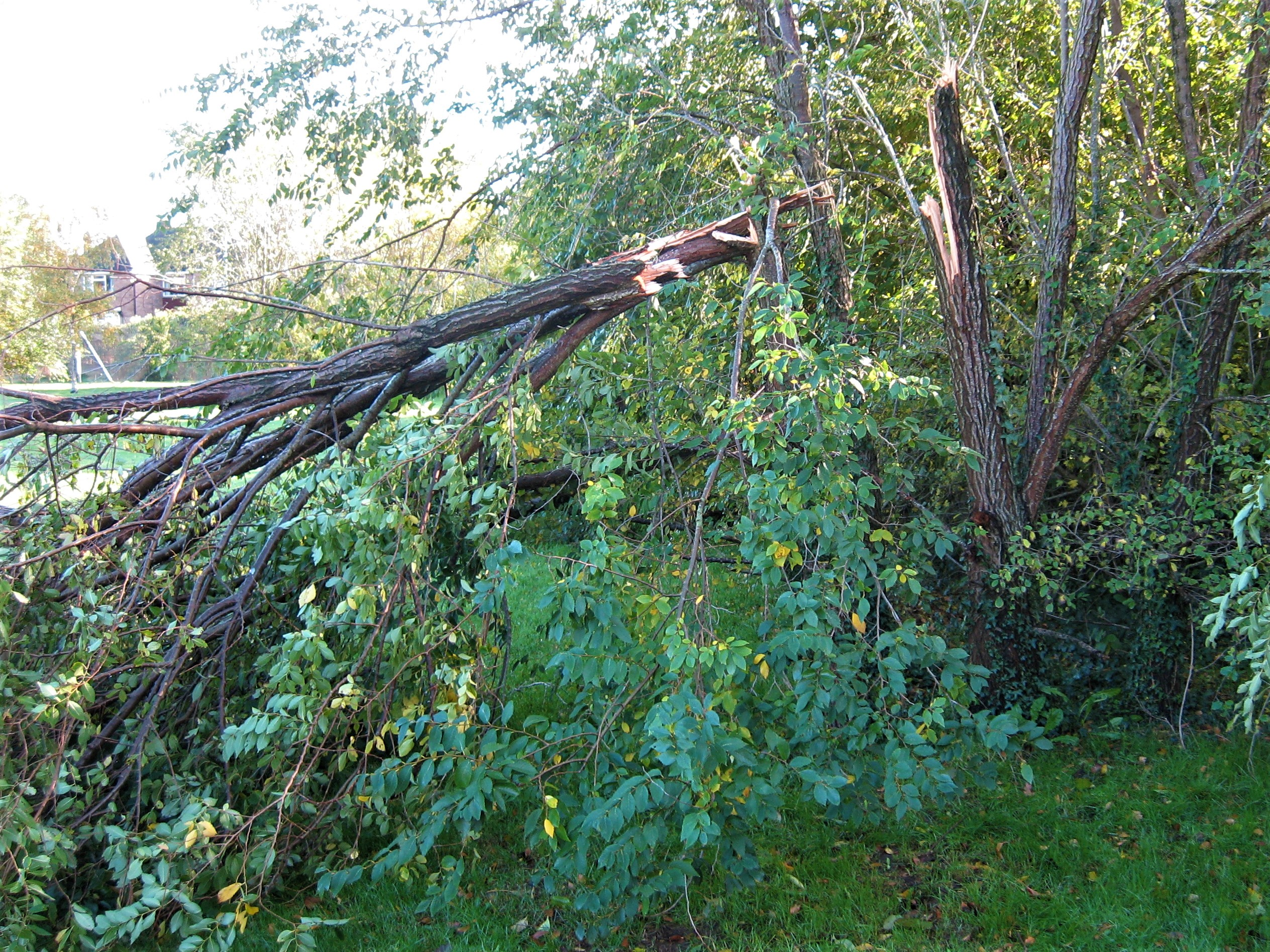
Felled by Force 8 gale, Portsmouth, UK

=== Cultivars ===
Valued for the high resistance of some clones to Dutch elm disease, over a dozen selections have been made to produce hardy ornamental cultivars, although several may no longer be in cultivation:

- Ansaloni
- Aurea = Beijing Gold
- Aurescens
- Chinkota
- Dropmore
- Dwarf Weeper
- Green King
- Hansen
- Harbin
- Manchu
- Mauro
- Mopheads
- Mr. Buzz
- Park Royal
- Pendula
- Pinnato-ramosa
- Poort Bulten
- Puszta
- Pyramidalis Fiorei
- Zhonghua Jinye

A variegated weeping elm, with cream, dark green, and light green variegation, is cultivated in China as Ulmus pumila 'Variegata'.

Some authorities consider the cultivar 'Berardii' a form of U. pumila. Nottingham elm, considered an Ulmus × hollandica by Richens, was marketed from the 19th century as 'Siberian elm'.

=== Hybrid cultivars ===
- Androssowii, U. × arbuscula, Fuente Umbria, Karagatch, Toledo

The species has been widely hybridized in the United States and Italy to create robust trees of more native appearance with high levels of resistance to Dutch elm disease:

- Arno, Cathedral, Coolshade, Fiorente, Homestead, Lincoln, Morton Plainsman = Vanguard, Morton Stalwart = Commendation, New Horizon, Plinio, Rebona, Regal, Recerta, Rosehill, San Zanobi, Urban, Willis, Dutch clone U.'260' (not released to commerce).

Other hybrid cultivars involving crossings with U. pumila:

- Den Haag, Sapporo Autumn Gold

== Uses ==
The unripe seeds have long been eaten by the peoples of Manchuria, and during the Great Chinese Famine, they also became one of the most important foodstuffs in the Harbin region. The leaves were also gathered, to the detriment of the trees, prompting a prohibition order by the authorities, which was largely ignored. The leaves eaten raw are not very palatable, but stewed and prepared with kaoliang or foxtail millet make a better-tasting and more filling meal.

== In literature and travel writing ==
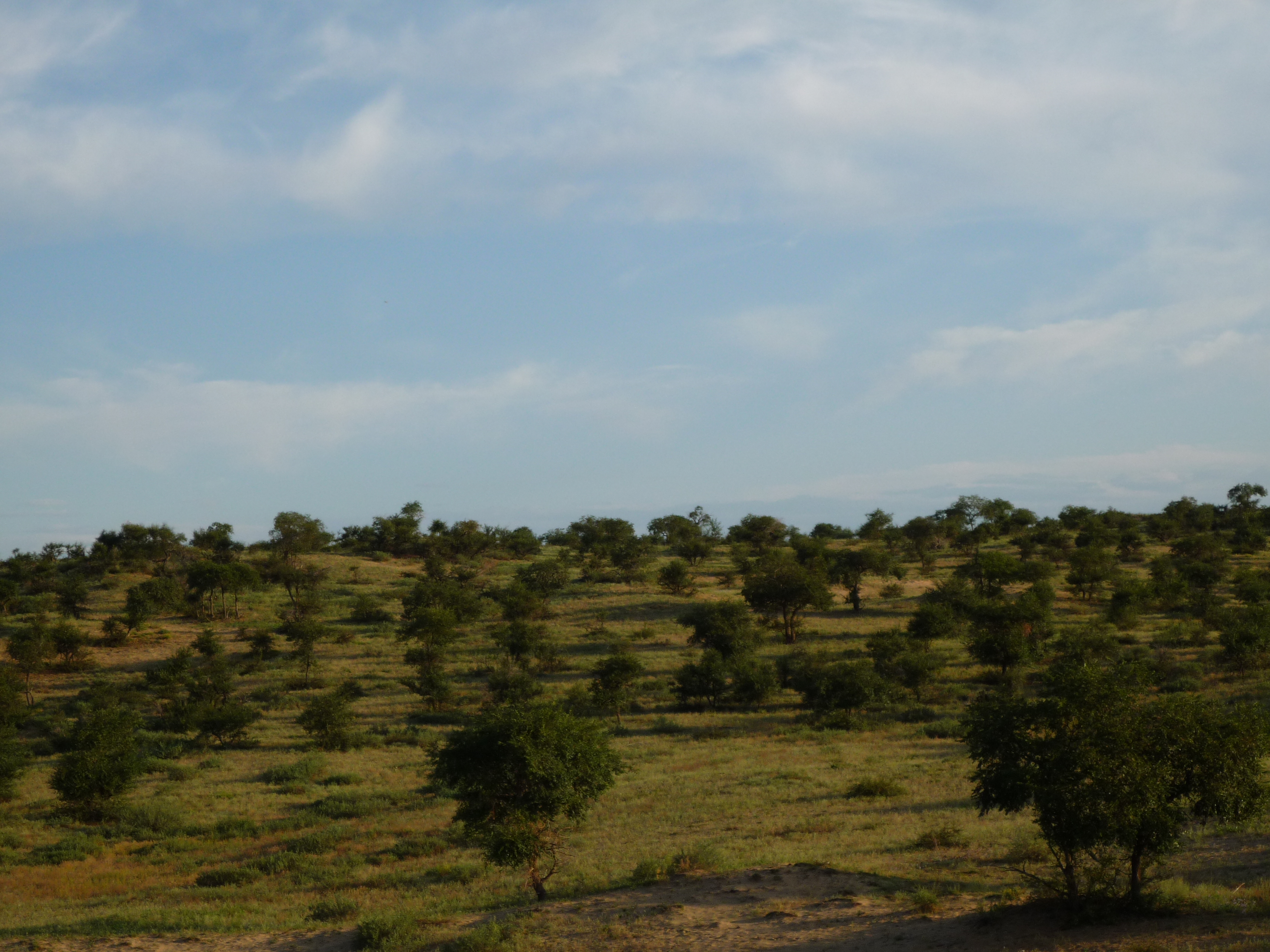
U. pumila open woodland in the sandy steppe in Bayannuur sum, Bulgan Province, Mongolia, 2008

The "dwarf-" or "shrub-elms" of the North Caucasus, along with other local flora, appear in the opening description of Tolstoy's story "The Raid" (1853).

Nicholas Roerich describes a specimen discovered on his travels through Mongolia:

We are in the deserts of Mongolia. It was hot and dusty yesterday. From far away, thunder was approaching. Some of our friends became tired from climbing the stony holy hills of Shiret Obo. While already returning to the camp, we noticed in the distance a huge elm tree – karagatch, - lonely, towering amidst the surrounding endless desert. The size of the tree, its somewhat familiar outlines attracted us into its shadow. Botanical considerations led us to believe that in the wide shade of the giant there might be some interesting herbs. Soon, all the co-workers gathered around the two mighty stems of the karagatch. The deep, deep shadow of the tree covered about 50 feet across. The powerful tree-stems were covered with fantastic burr growths. In the rich foliage, birds were singing and the beautiful branches were stretched out in all directions, as if wishing to give shelter to all pilgrims.

=== Accessions ===
==== North America ====
- Arnold Arboretum, US. Acc. nos. 17923, 638-79, 673-87.
- Denver Botanic Gardens, US. Acc. no. 900534.
- Dominium Arboretum, Ottawa, Ontario, Canada. No acc. details available.
- Holden Arboretum, US. Acc. nos. 99-868, 72-218
- Longwood Gardens, US. Acc. no. 1962-0512.
- Morton Arboretum, US. Acc. nos. 542-49, 325-70, 53-74, 172-U.
- UBC Botanical Garden and Centre for Plant Research, US. Acc. no. 027560-0284-1989.

==== Europe ====
- Arboretum of Warsaw University of Life Sciences, University of Life Sciences, Warsaw, Poland. 2 trees, no accession details available.
- Brighton & Hove City Council, UK. NCCPG Elm Collection.
- Dubrava Arboretum, Lithuania. No details available.
- Grange Farm Arboretum, Lincolnshire, UK. Acc. no. 521.
- Hergest Croft Gardens, Herefordshire, UK. One tree, no accession details available.
- Hortus Botanicus Nationalis, Salaspils, Latvia. Acc. nos. 18162,3,4.
- Royal Botanic Gardens, Wakehurst Place, UK. Acc. no. 2000-4449.
- Sir Harold Hillier Gardens. Acc. no. 2016.0386, grown from seed of tree in Utah, US.
- Tallinn Botanic Garden, Estonia. . No accession details available.
- Thorp Perrow Arboretum, Yorkshire, UK. British Champion tree, 19 m high, 70 cm d.b.h. in 2004.
- Westonbirt Arboretum , Tetbury, Glos., UK. Two trees planted 1981, no acc.details.
- Wijdemeren City Council elm collection, Netherlands. Lines of 'Puszta' planted Smeerdijkgaarde, Kortenhoef, 2013, and Dammerweg, Nederhorst den Berg, 2015.

==== Australasia ====
- Alma Park, St Kilda, Victoria, Australia. One specimen, listed on the National Trust of Victoria's Significant Tree Register.
- Eastwoodhill Arboretum , Gisborne, New Zealand. 2 trees, details not known.

==== Africa ====
- Arboretum of Haramaya University, Haramaya, Ethiopia

=== Nurseries ===
==== Europe ====
- Van Den Berk (UK) Ltd., , London, UK
