= Ulmus pumila 'Mauro' =

Elm cultivar

- Species: Ulmus pumila
- Cultivar: 'Mauro'
- Origin: Netherlands

The Siberian elm cultivar Ulmus pumila 'Mauro' hails from the G & M nursery at Dodewaard, Netherlands, where it is listed as Ulmus pendula 'Mauro'.

== Description ==
The tree has a pronounced weeping habit, but otherwise resembles the species.

== Pests and diseases ==
The tree is claimed to be fully resistant 'to all diseases'.

== Cultivation ==
The tree is known (2024) to be in cultivation in the Netherlands and Italy. It is claimed the tree is able to 'grow easily in all soils'.

== Accessions ==
None known

== Nurseries ==
=== Europe ===
- Georgio Tesi, Bottegone, Pistoia, Italy
- The Tree Centre, Opheusden, Netherlands
