= Ulmus pumila 'Ansaloni' =

Elm cultivar

- Arturo Ansaloni (left) holding an 'Ansaloni', Bologna, circa 1933.
- Species: Ulmus pumila
- Cultivar: 'Ansaloni'
- Origin: Italy

The Siberian elm cultivar Ulmus pumila 'Ansaloni' was raised by the Ansaloni Nurseries , Bologna, c. 1933, from a tree introduced from the Far East in 1930.

== Description ==
'Ansaloni' is a quick-growing variety with a compact crown, holding its leaves well into autumn.

== Pests and diseases ==
See under Ulmus pumila.

== Cultivation ==
The tree was sold mostly to winegrowers in the Po valley, who were still using traditional Roman cultivation methods after the Second World War, but the advent of mechanization in the 1950s brought about the tree's decline, and it had been withdrawn from commerce by the 1970s. One specimen is known to remain in cultivation in North America (see Accessions).

== Synonymy ==
- 'Siber-Ansaloni': Ansaloni Nurseries, Bologna, Italy, Catalogue, 1946–47, p. 28.

== Accessions ==
=== North America ===
- Arnold Arboretum, US. Acc. no. 636-61 (accession date: 2 May 1961) grown from seed in US collected from 'Ansaloni'.
