= Ulmus pumila 'Zhonghua Jinye' =

Elm cultivar

- Species: Ulmus pumila
- Cultivar: 'Zhonghua Jinye'
- Origin: China

The Siberian Elm cultivar Ulmus pumila 'Zhonghua Jinye' is an introduction from China.

== Description ==
'Jinye' forms a dense, rounded shrub bearing soft yellow foliage.

== Pests and diseases ==
See under Ulmus pumila.

== Cultivation ==
The cultivar was introduced to China in 2014; it is not yet known beyond that country.

== Accessions ==
None known.

== Nurseries ==
None known.
