= Ulmus pumila 'Park Royal' =

Elm cultivar

- Species: Ulmus pumila
- Cultivar: 'Park Royal'
- Origin: Canada

The Siberian Elm cultivar Ulmus pumila 'Park Royal' is a cold-hardy selection raised by the Sheridan Nursery, Toronto, Ontario, Canada.

== Description ==
The tree was briefly described by the Sheridan Nursery in its Trade List of Spring 1969, as an "improved specimen, fast growing". It has upright branches, with dark green foliage turning yellow in autumn.

== Pests and diseases ==
See under Ulmus pumila.

== Cultivation ==
'Park Royal' is not known to be in cultivation beyond Canada.

== Accessions ==
- Dominion Arboretum, Ottawa, Ontario, Canada. No acc. details.
- University of Guelph Arboretum, Canada. Two trees: acc. no. 1975-0487, 1989-0279

== Nurseries ==
=== North America ===
- Quebec Multiplants, Quebec, Canada.
