= Ulmus pumila 'Hansen' =

Elm cultivar

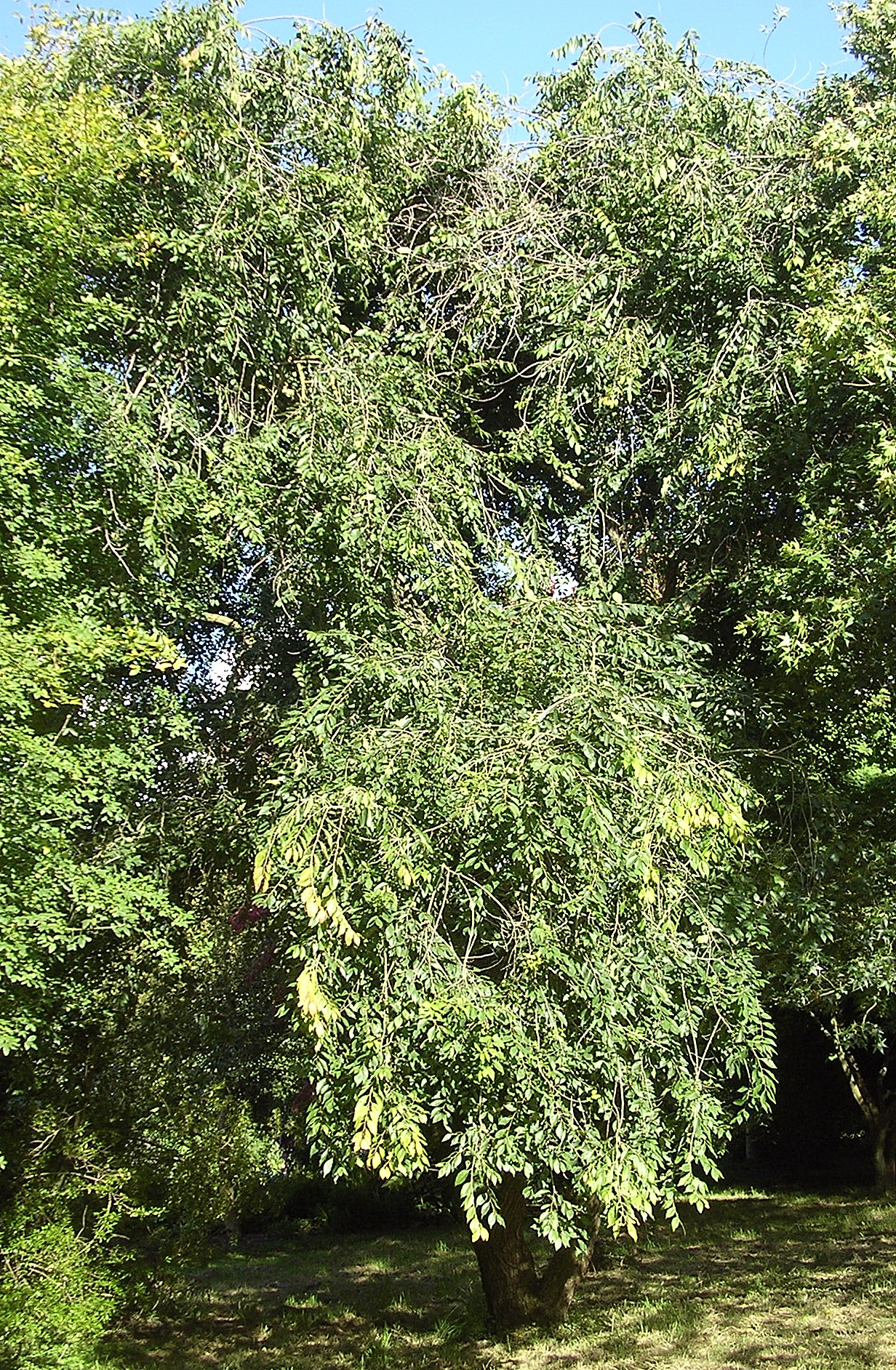
- 'Hansen' at Hillier Arboretum
- Species: Ulmus pumila
- Cultivar: 'Hansen'
- Origin: US

The Siberian elm cultivar Ulmus pumila 'Hansen' is a little-known American tree, raised from seed collected by the horticulturist and botanist Prof. Niels Hansen during his expedition to eastern Siberia in 1897, and further developed in South Dakota.

Krüssmann (1976) mistakenly listed 'Hansen' under Ulmus parvifolia. Santamour and Bentz's 'Updated Checklist of Elm (Ulmus) Cultivars for use in North America' (1995) does not list a 'Hansen' under U. pumila, but includes a 'Hansen's Hybrid' under North American Hybrids and Selections.

== Description ==
Krüssmann described 'Hansen' as fast growing, with ovate, long-acuminate biserrate leaves to 8 cm long, with rounded base. A specimen planted in 1978 at the Sir Harold Hillier Gardens in England had attained a height of 8 m by 2002. It has open, somewhat tortuous branching and a semi-pendulous habit.

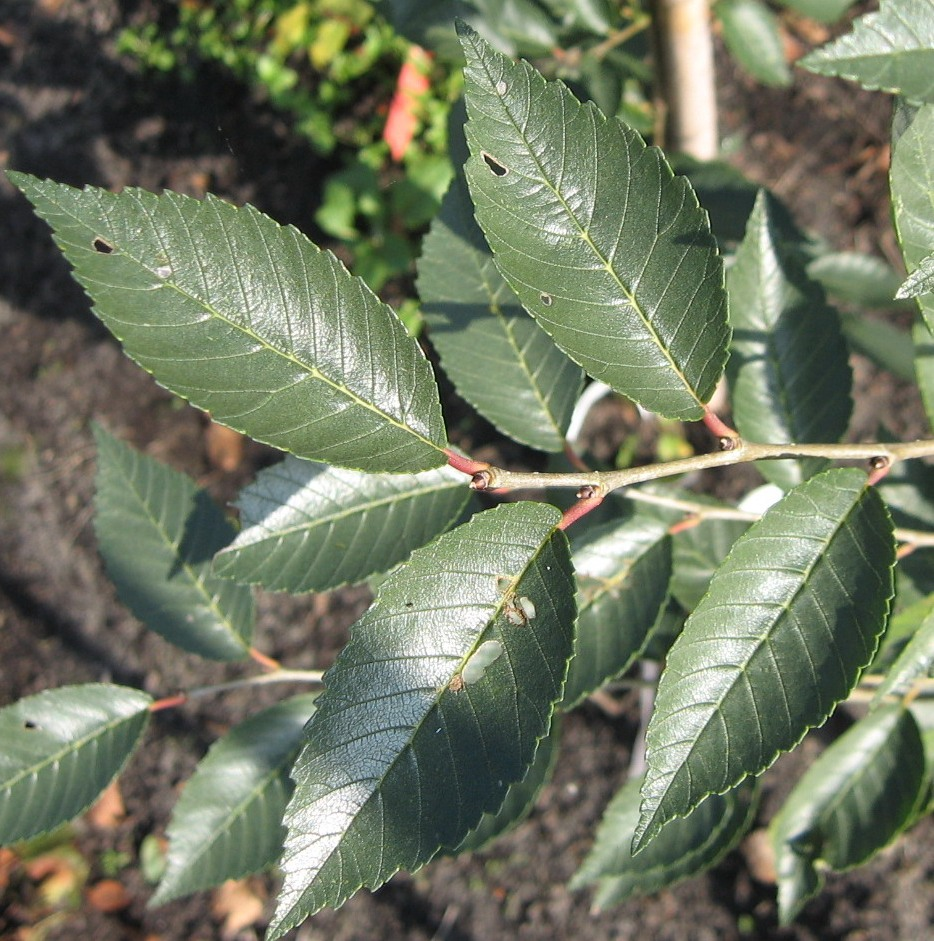
Leaves of 'Hansen'

== Cultivation ==
The tree's current status in North America is not known. At least one mature specimen survives in the UK. Significantly, it is not listed in Green's digest of elm cultivar names published in 1964, suggesting a rather belated introduction to commerce. Krüssmann gives a cultivation date of 1972.

== Notable trees ==
The Hilliers tree, possibly a unique specimen, remains healthy (2025).

== Pests and diseases ==
See under Ulmus pumila.

== Synonymy ==
- ?'Hansen's Hybrid': Jewell Nursery (ceased trading 2001), Lake City, Minnesota, United States. Wholesale Price List, Fall, 1968 - Spring 1969, p 6, described as "with larger leaf than Chinese (Elm)", but without provenance details.

== Accessions ==
=== Europe ===
- Brighton & Hove City Council, UK, NCCPG Elm Collection.
- Sir Harold Hillier Gardens, UK. Acc. no. 1978.1606
