= Ulmus pumila 'Dwarf Weeper' =

Elm cultivar

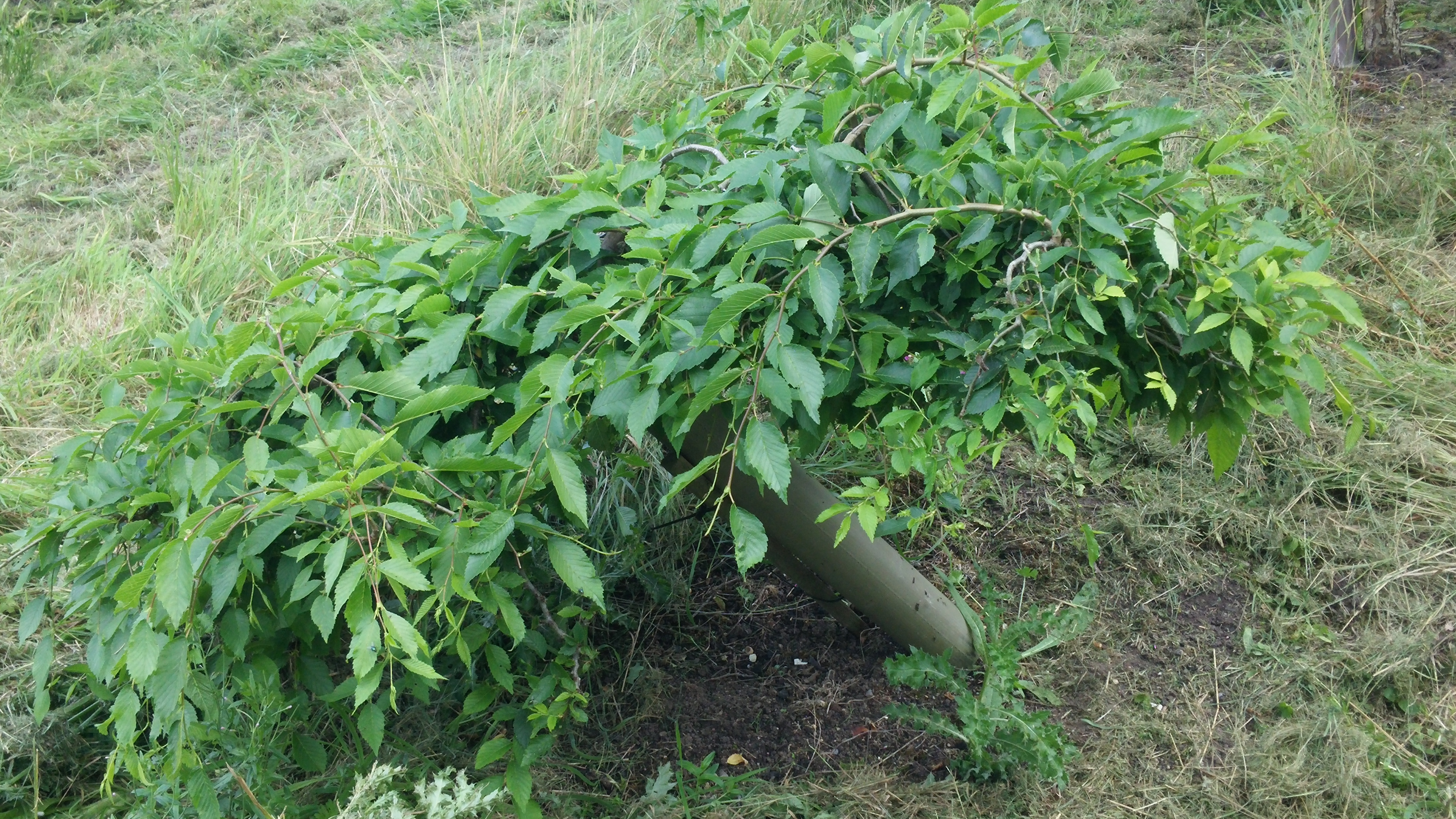
- 'Dwarf Weeper', Grange Farm Arboretum
- Species: Ulmus pumila
- Cultivar: 'Dwarf Weeper'
- Origin: US

The Siberian elm cultivar Ulmus pumila 'Dwarf Weeper' was discovered in a western Illinois garden and sold by the Arborvillage Nursery (ceased trading in 2006) Holt, Missouri.

== Description ==
The tree was described as "a strongly weeping little plant growing 7 ft (2.1 m) perhaps after many years". A specimen at the Arborvillage Nursery was less than 3 ft (0.91 m) after 3 years.

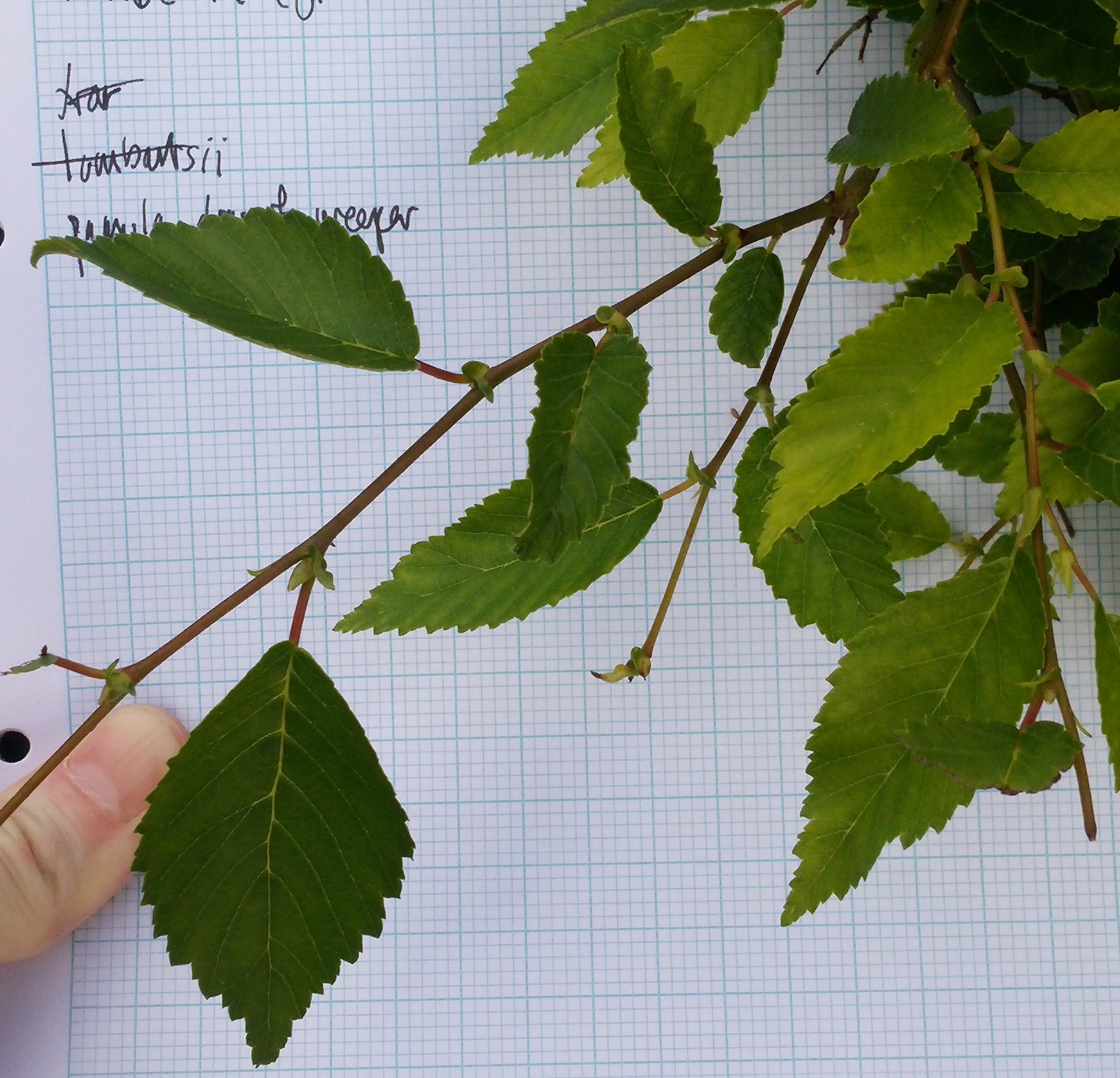
'Dwarf Weeper' at Grange Farm Arboretum

== Pests and diseases ==
The species and its cultivars are highly resistant, but not immune, to Dutch elm disease, and unaffected by the elm leaf beetle Xanthogaleruca luteola.

== Cultivation ==
Restricted to North America; the only known introduction to Europe, is at the Grange Farm Arboretum, England.

=== Putative specimen ===
A notably pendulous small-leaved elm in the JC Raulston Arboretum, Raleigh, North Carolina (2019), labelled Ulmus minor subsp. minor 'Pendula', 'Weeping small-leaved elm', has U. pumila-type fruit and is indistinguishable in leaf and form from U. pumila 'Dwarf Weeper'. The arboretum acquired other specimen trees from Arborvillage Nursery, Holt, Missouri.

== Accessions ==
Europe

- Grange Farm Arboretum, Sutton St James, Spalding, Lincolnshire, UK. Acc. No. 521
