= Ulmus 'Densa' =

Elm cultivar

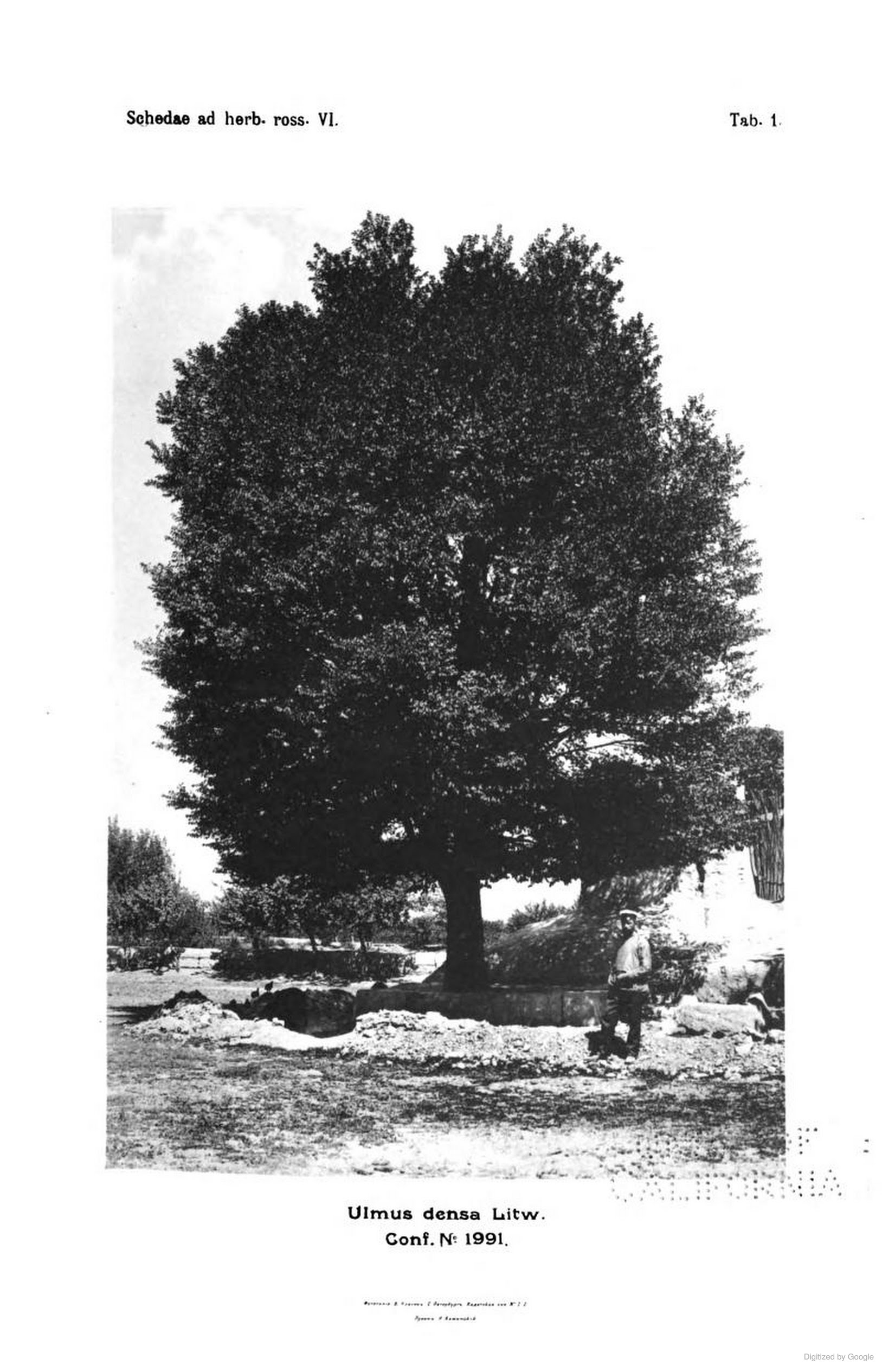
- 'Densa'
- Genus: Ulmus
- Cultivar: 'Densa'
- Origin: C. Asia

The elm cultivar Ulmus Densa was described from specimens growing near Ashkabad as U. densa Litv. in Schedae ad Herbarium Florae Rossicae (1908). Litvinov, reporting it growing wild in the mountains of Turkestan, Ferghana, and Aksu, as well as in cultivation, considered it a species, a view upheld by the Soviet publications Trees and Shrubs in the USSR (1951) and Flora of Armenia (1962), and by some current plant lists. (Note: Ulmus densa was one of two elm "species" determined by Litvinov; the second, his Ulmus celtidea, has not been accepted by other authorities (Journal of the Arnold Arboretum, vol.19, 1938; p.264).) Other authorities take it to be a form of U minor, distinctive only in its dense crown and upright branching. The Moscow State University herbarium gives (2020) Ulmus minor as the "accepted name" of U. densa Litv..

Litvinov considered U. minor 'Umbraculifera', with its "denser crown and more rounded form", a cultivar of U. densa, calling it U. densa var. bubyriana. Rehder (1949) and Green (1964), ignoring reports of the wild form, considered U. densa a synonym of 'Umbraculifera'. The U. densa photographed by Meyer in Aksu, Chinese Turkestan on his 1911-12 expedition does not appear to be the tidy grafted cultivar 'Umbraculifera' and was said to be named 'Seda'. Zielińksi in Flora Iranica (1979) considered 'Umbraculifera' an U. minor cultivar.

In its natural range U. densa overlaps with U. pumila. The extent of hybridization between the two is not known.

== Description ==
Litvinov noted that the tree "differed little from U. glabra Mill." [:U. minor] except in its erect branches and dense oblong crown. The leaves were "generally smaller" and the branches "smooth and lighter in colour". As with the hybrid U. × androssowii, its compact branch structure helps the tree conserve moisture.

== Pests and diseases ==
Not known.

== Cultivation ==
Litvinov said that U. densa was "widely cultivated" in gardens in Turkestan. It is one of a number of elms known locally as 'karagach' or 'karagatch' [:'black tree' = elm]. In western Europe U. densa Litv. was distributed by Hesse's Nurseries, Weener, Germany, in the 1930s.

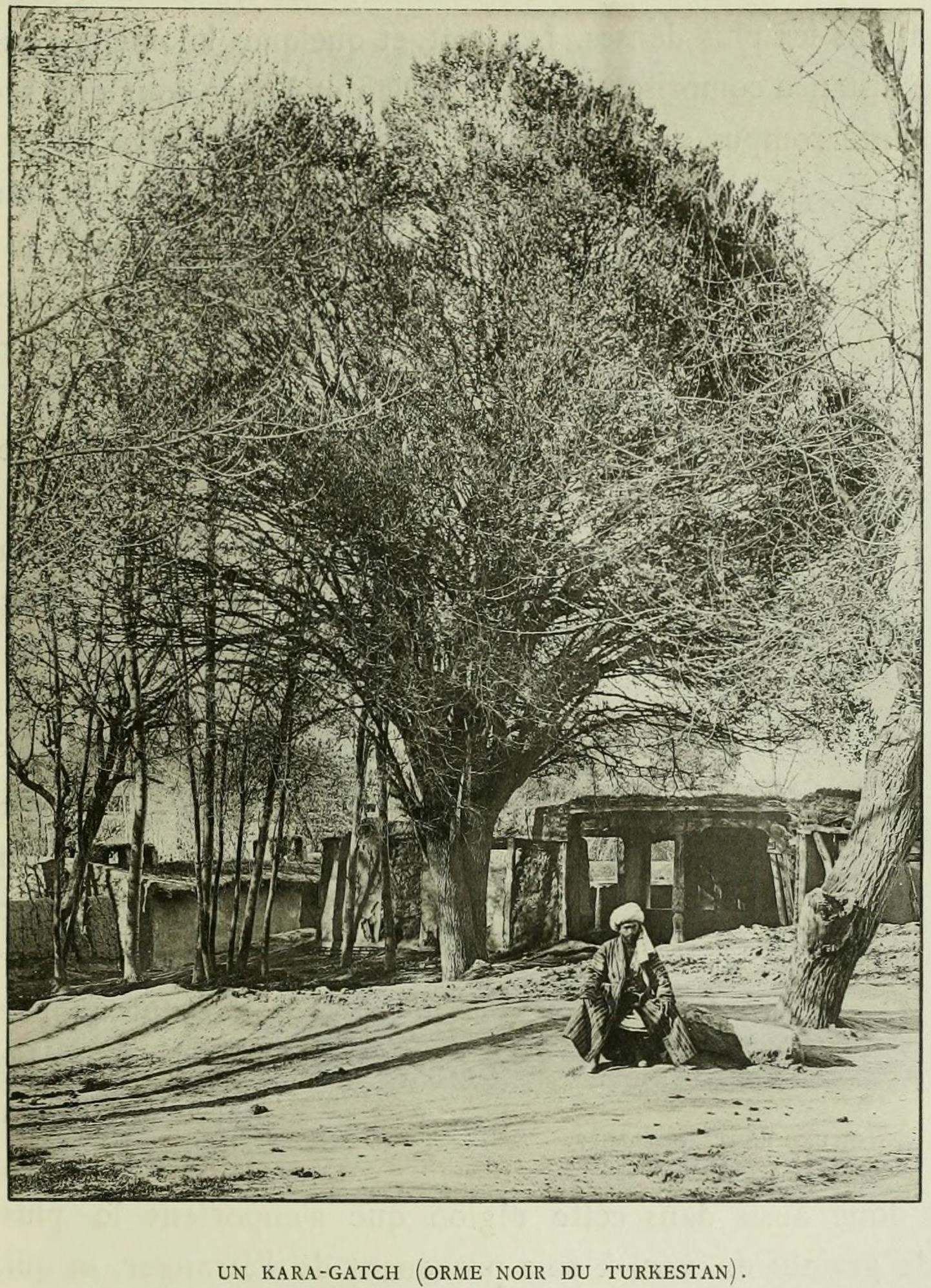
Dense-branched elm, upright form, Turkestan, c.1900

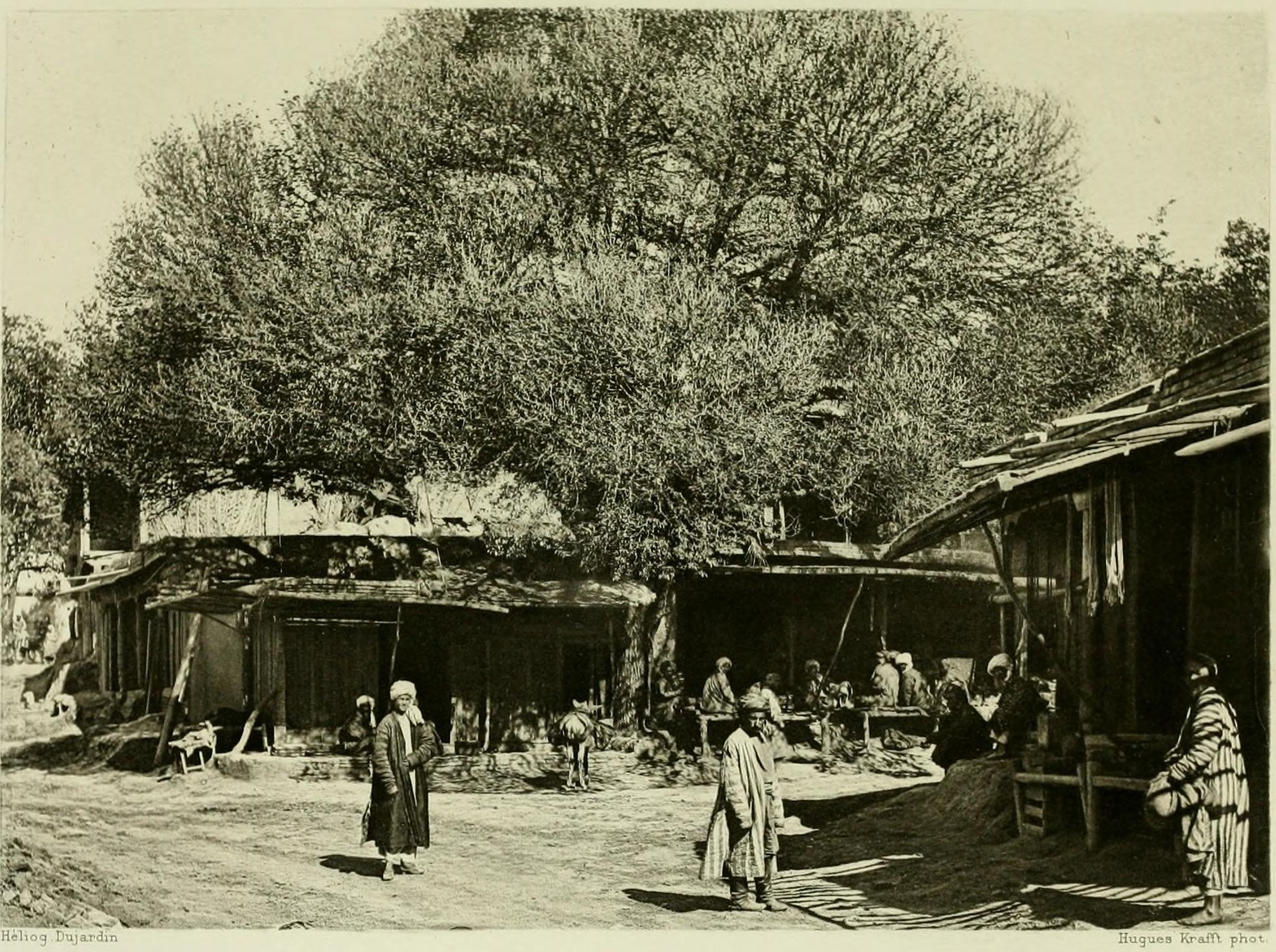
Dense-branched elm, spreading form, Turkestan, c.1900

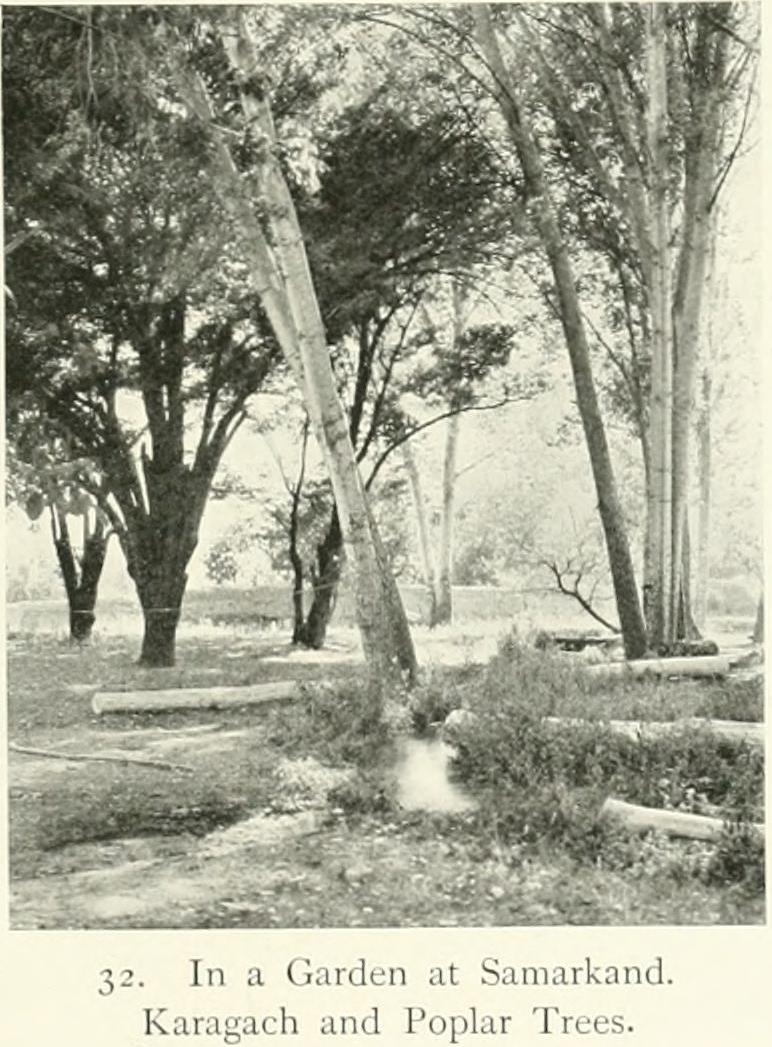
Dense-branched elm (left), Turkestan, c.1912

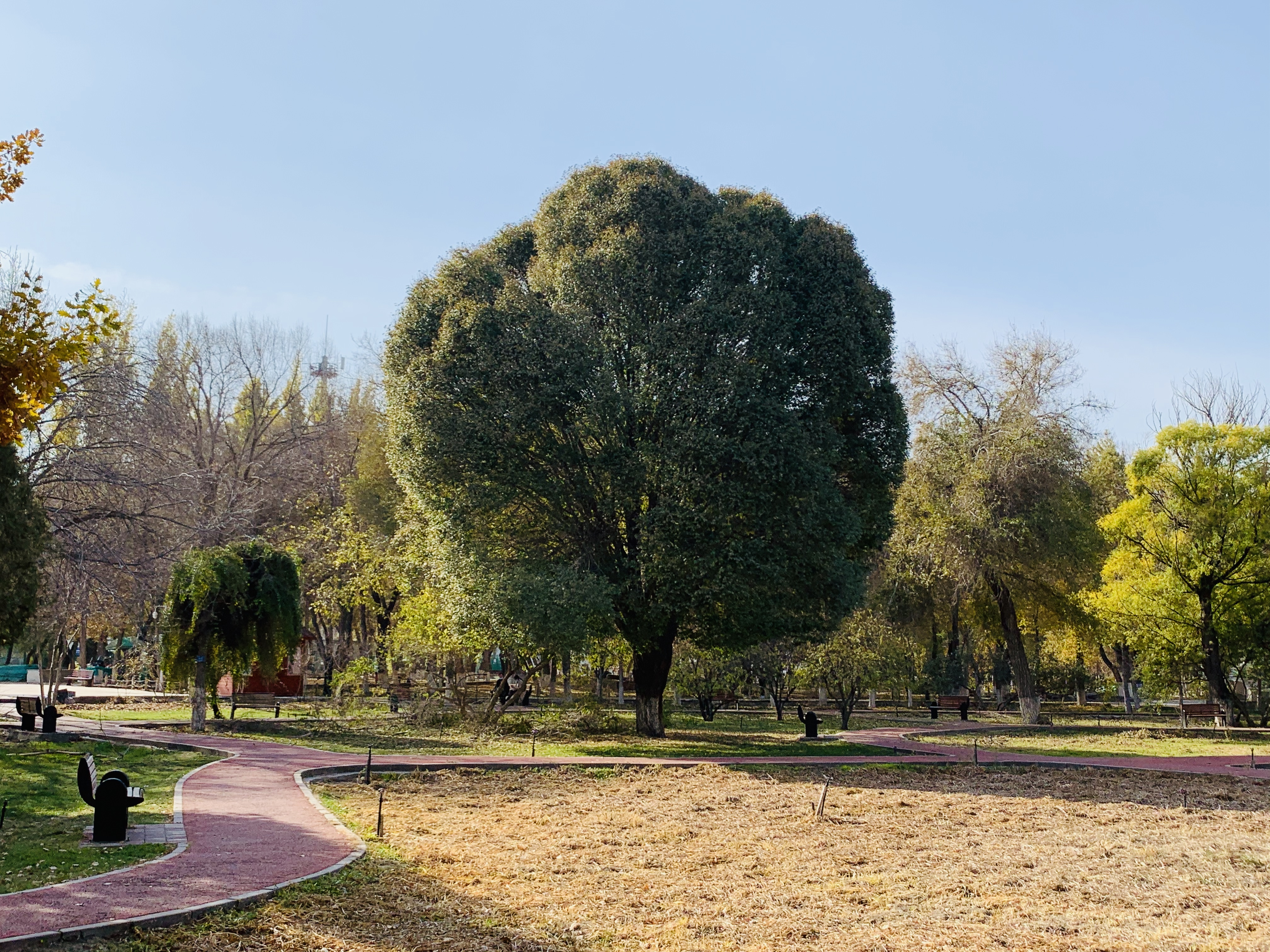
Ulmus densa in Urumqi Botanical Garden, Xinjiang, China (2021)

== Notable trees ==
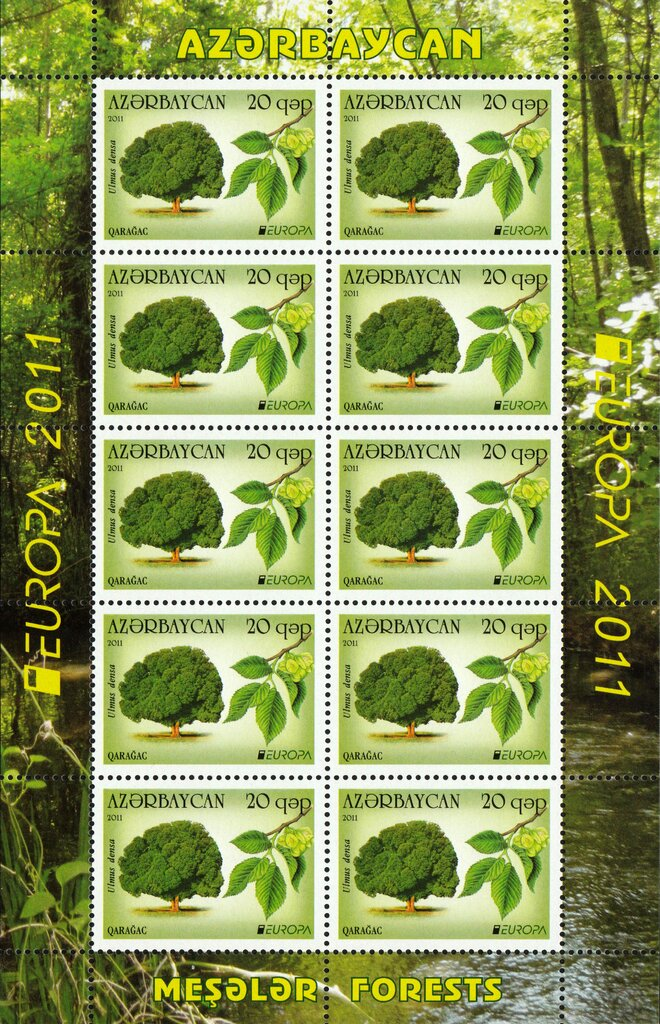
Ulmus densa on 2011 Azerbaijan stamp

A large, well-grown specimen stands in Dushanbe Botanic Gardens, Tajikistan (2019).

== Cultivars ==
These include one of the oldest of elm cultivars, 'Umbraculifera', and a number of elms introduced to the West by the Späth nursery of Berlin.

- U. minor 'Umbraculifera', (?) U. minor 'Rueppellii', (?) U. 'Globosa', (?) U. 'Koopmannii'

Meyer (1912) identified three cultivars of U. densa: 'Stamboul', 'Kitaisky' and 'Seda'.

== Hybrid cultivars ==
The tree, or its cultivar form 'Umbraculifera', has hybridised with U. pumila to produce U. × androssowii.

== Accessions ==
None known.
