= Ulmus 'Androssowii' =

Elm cultivar

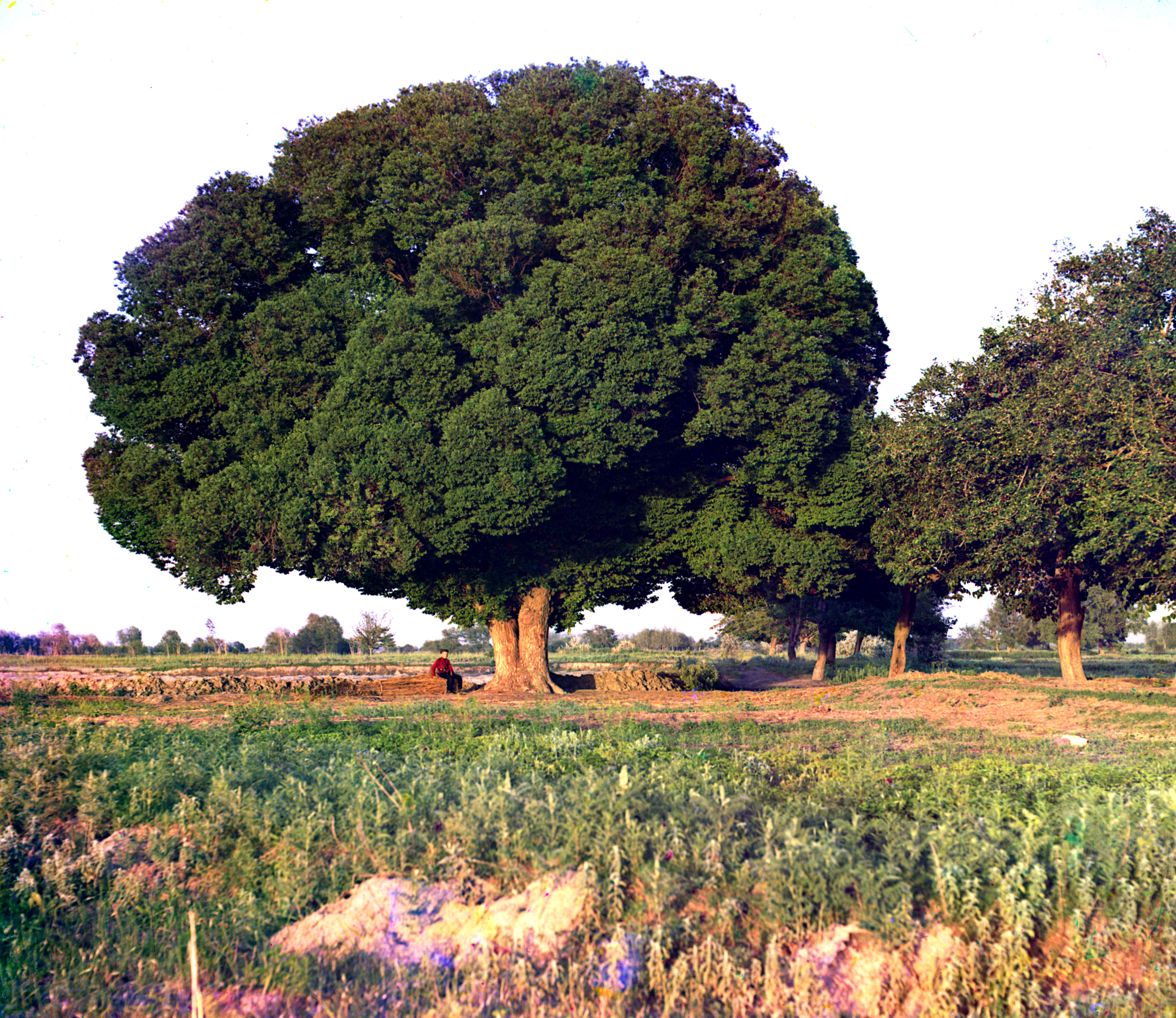
- Karagach [:black tree, = elm], Samarkand
- Genus: Ulmus
- Cultivar: 'Androssowii'
- Origin: Uzbekistan

The hybrid cultivar Ulmus 'Androssowii' R. Kam. (or 'Androsowii'), an elm of southern Kazakhstan, Uzbekistan and Tajikistan sometimes referred to in old travel books as 'Turkestan Elm' or as 'karagach' [:black tree, = elm], its local name, is probably an artificial hybrid. According to Lozina-Lozinskaia the tree is unknown in the wild in Uzbekistan, and apparently arose from a crossing of U. densa var. bubyriana Litv. (now Ulmus minor 'Umbraculifera'), which it resembles (see the disputed species Ulmus densa), and the Siberian Elm Ulmus pumila. It is sometimes listed as Ulmus × androssowii (see below).

Not to be confused with the Ulmus 'Turkestanica' distributed by the Späth nursery of Berlin.

For so-called Ulmus androssowii var. subhirsuta C. K. Schneid. and Ulmus androssowii var. virgata (Planch.) Grudz. , see Ulmus chumlia.

== Description ==
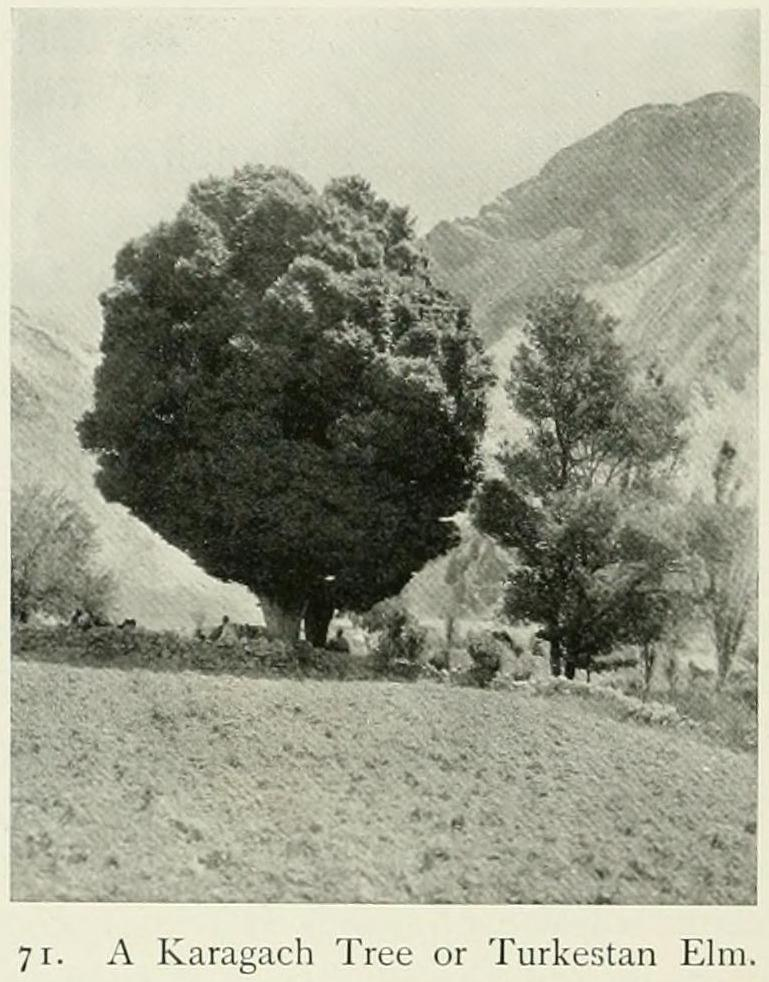
Turkestan Elm, c.1910

The tree grows to a height of 20 metres (66 ft) and is distinguished by its very dense spherical crown and pubescent leaves. Rehder noted (1939) that though similar in habit to 'Umbraculifera', 'Androssowi' could be "easily distinguished" by the grayish-brown bark of its twigs with conspicuous corky wings on older branches, by the pubescent winter-buds, by the mostly shallow- and single-toothed leaves, pubescent beneath, and by the near-orbicular fruit 10–13 mm in diameter, with the seed slightly above the middle. In 'Umbraculifera', by contrast, the twigs are red-brown and never corky, the leaves are more clearly and sharply double-toothed, only slightly pubescent beneath when young and soon smooth, and the obovate fruit is wedge-shaped at base and about 1.5 cm long, with the seed close to the notch. The compact branch structure of 'Androssowii' helps the tree conserve moisture.

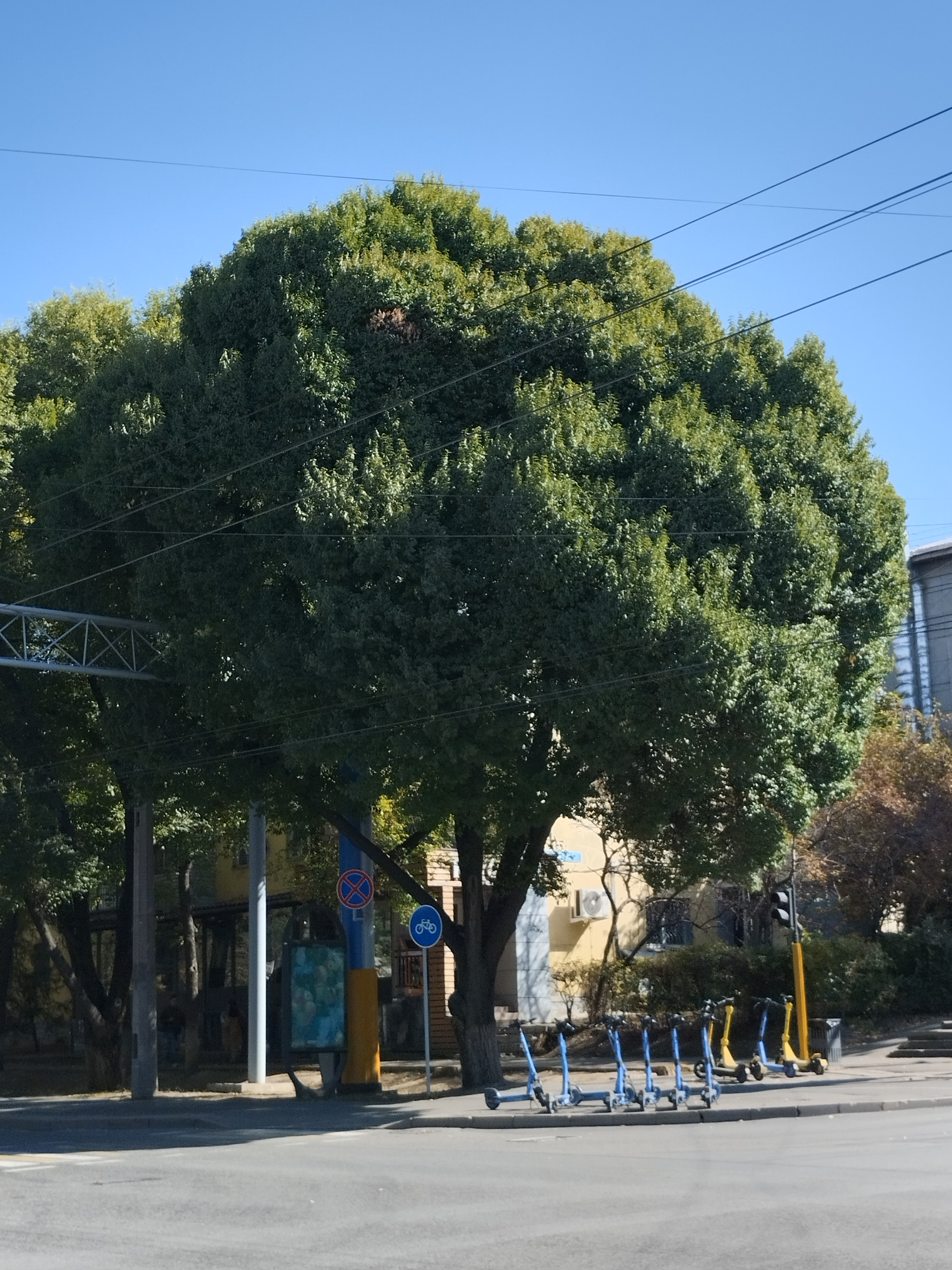
Mature specimen of 'Androssowii' in Almaty

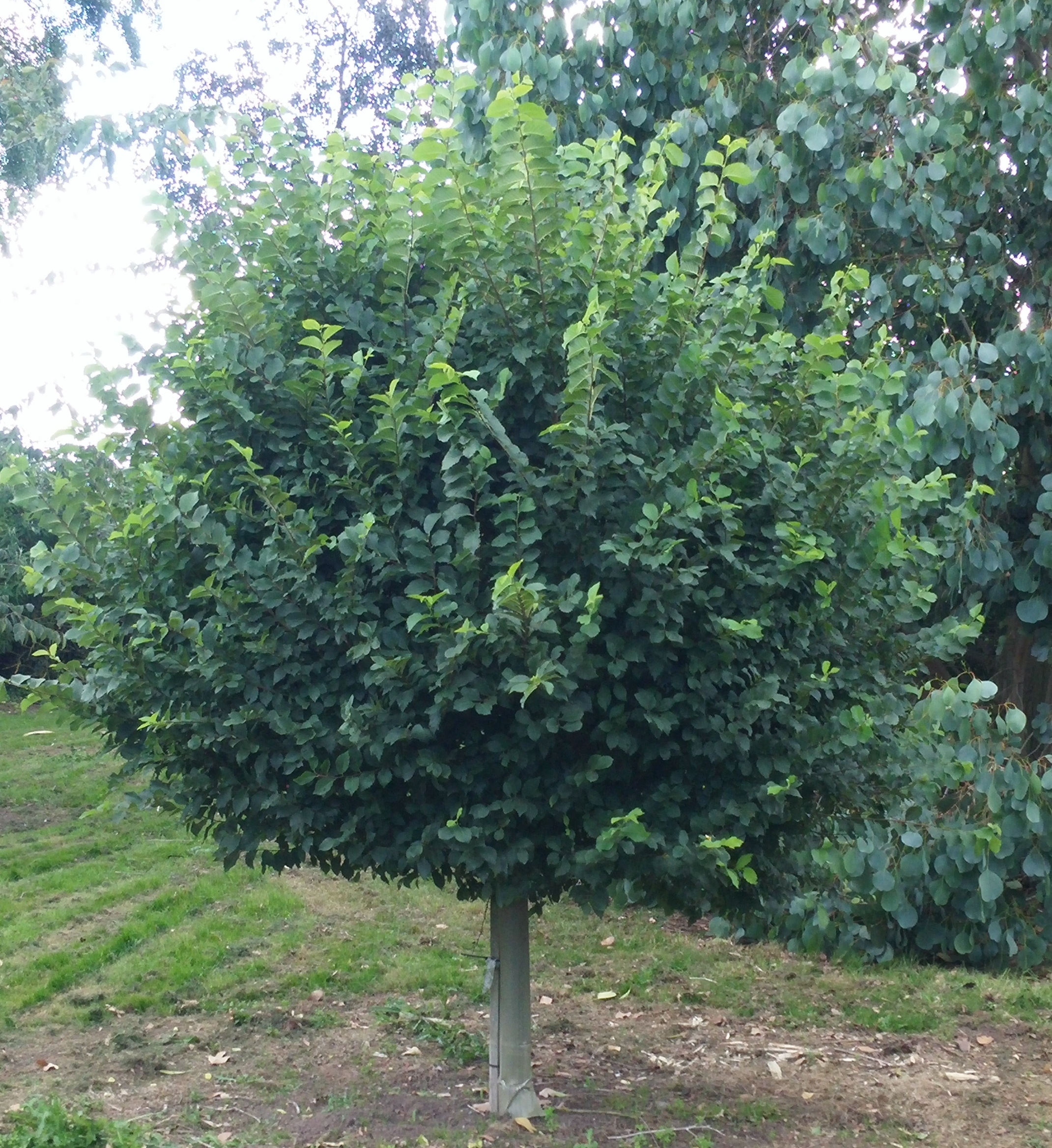
Young 'Androssowii', Grange Farm Arboretum, Lincolnshire

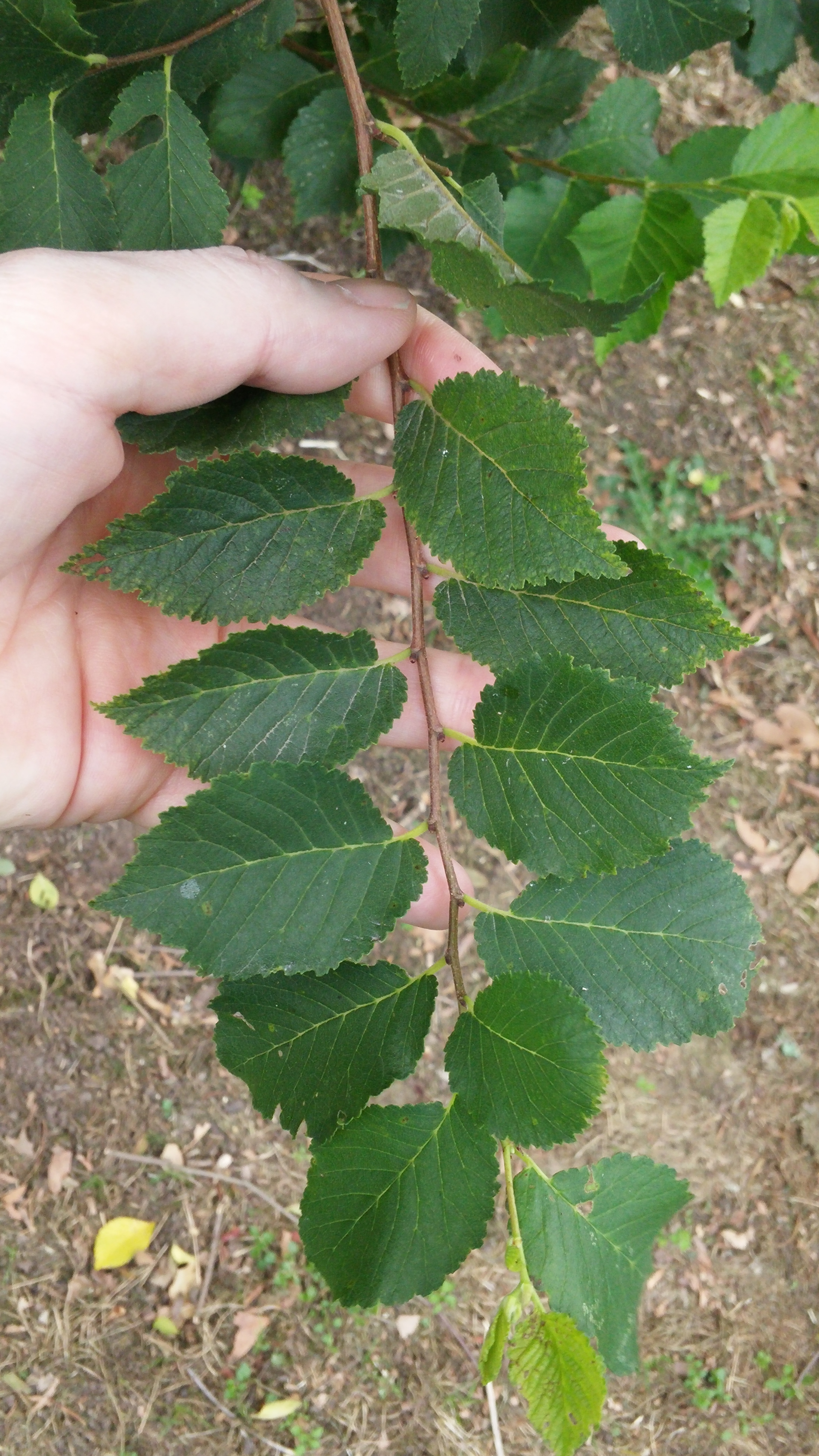
Leaves of same

... In a garden near our sarai we saw some very fine karagach. The karagach or Turkestan elm is one of the typical trees of the Duab landscape, chiefly owing to its tendency of forming leafy balloons of great regularity. As the main limbs shoot upwards like a bunch of flowers gradually unfolding near the top, and as the secondary boughs follow this example, the inner space of the cupola of foliage is a tangle of close-set ramifications which retains dead branches as well as the flotsam and jetsam of the air. As moreover short spikes and twigs grow out everywhere, the whole forms a disorderly nest of bark, leaves, sticks, and straws affording protection to many small birds.

– From Willi Rickmer Rickmers, The Duab of Turkestan, a physiographic sketch and account of some travels (1913).

== Pests and diseases ==
Not known. In 1987, according to a Forestry Commission study of the Dushanbe area, Tajikistan, elms including 'Androssowii' "were plentiful in the city, pastures and roadside plantations, but no symptoms of Dutch elm disease, foliar or internal, were found. Breeding galleries of a Scolytus species close to Scolytus multistriatus were present in stressed or dying trees but no Ophiostoma ulmi was obtained from the galleries." The report concluded that, to date, the region may have escaped Dutch elm disease through geographical isolation.

== Cultivation ==
The hybrid has been widely planted in southern and western areas of the former Soviet Union, notably along the streets of Samarkand and Almaty. In western Europe it was distributed by Hesse's Nurseries, Weener, Germany, in the 1930s. A specimen was present at Kew Gardens in the 1930s. Cold-hardy, it prefers a rich soil and moderate humidity.

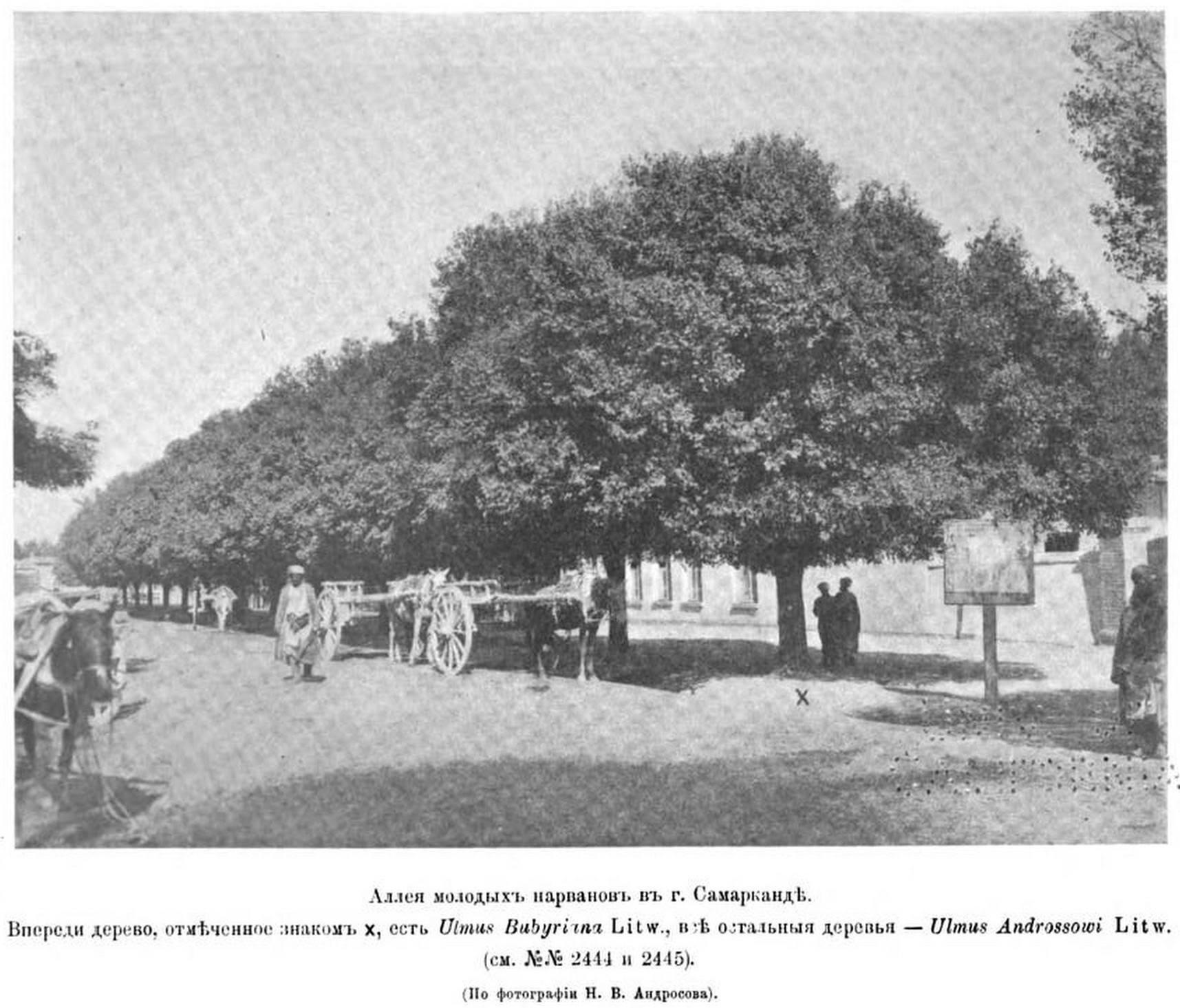
'Androssowii' left, U. Bubyriana [:Ulmus minor 'Umbraculifera'] right, Samarkand (1903)

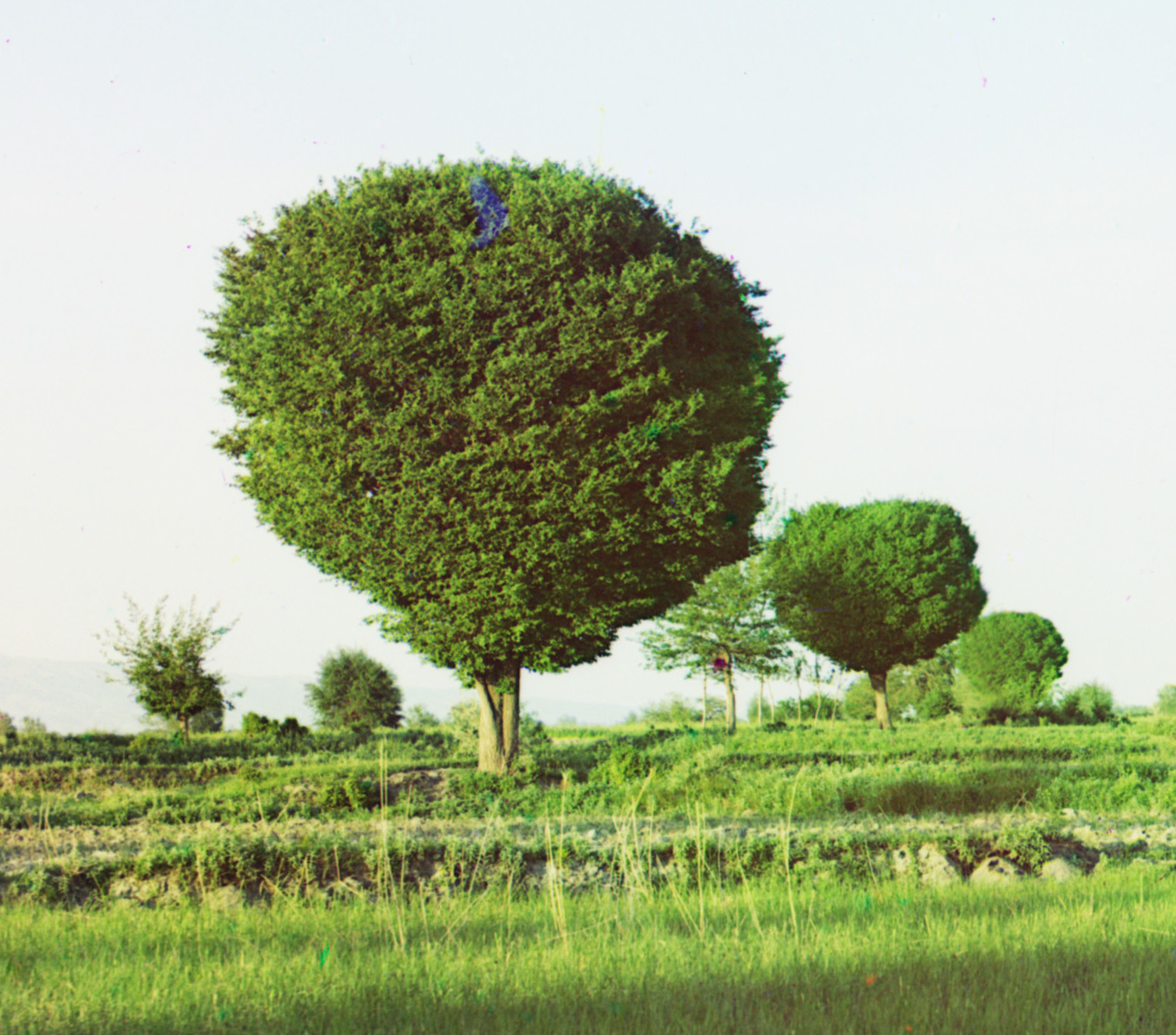
Turkestan Elm near Samarkand, early 20th century

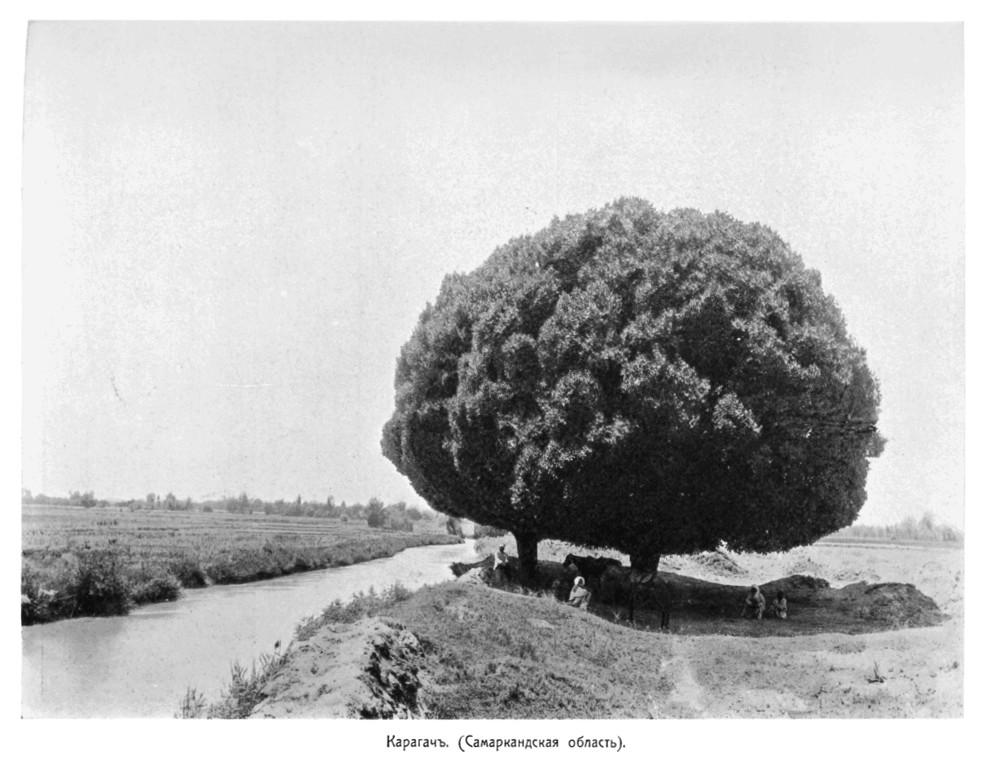
Turkestan Elm near Samarkand, early 20th century

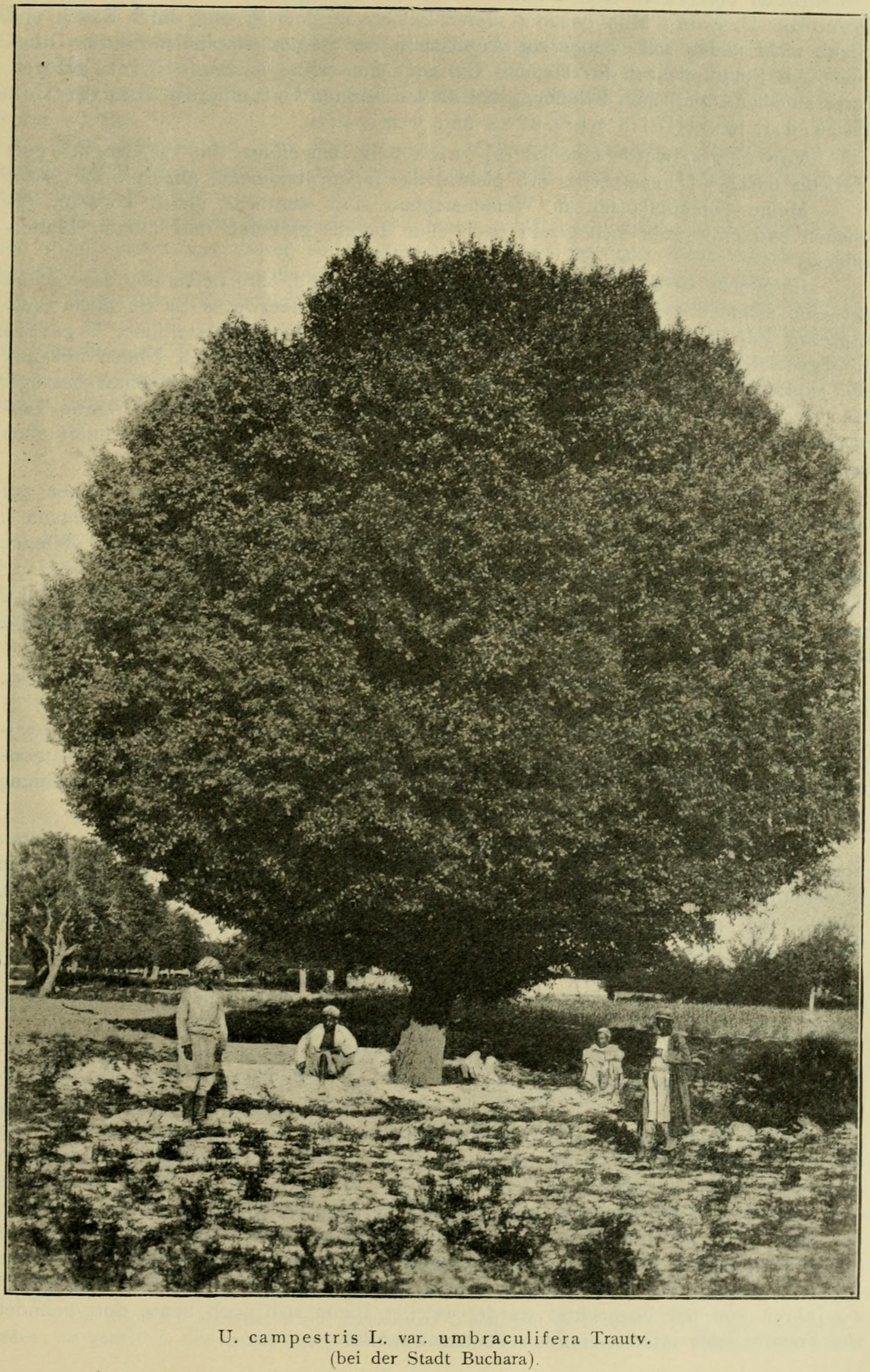
Photo captioned 'Umbraculifera' but possibly 'Androssowii', Bukhara, Uzbekistan (c.1910)

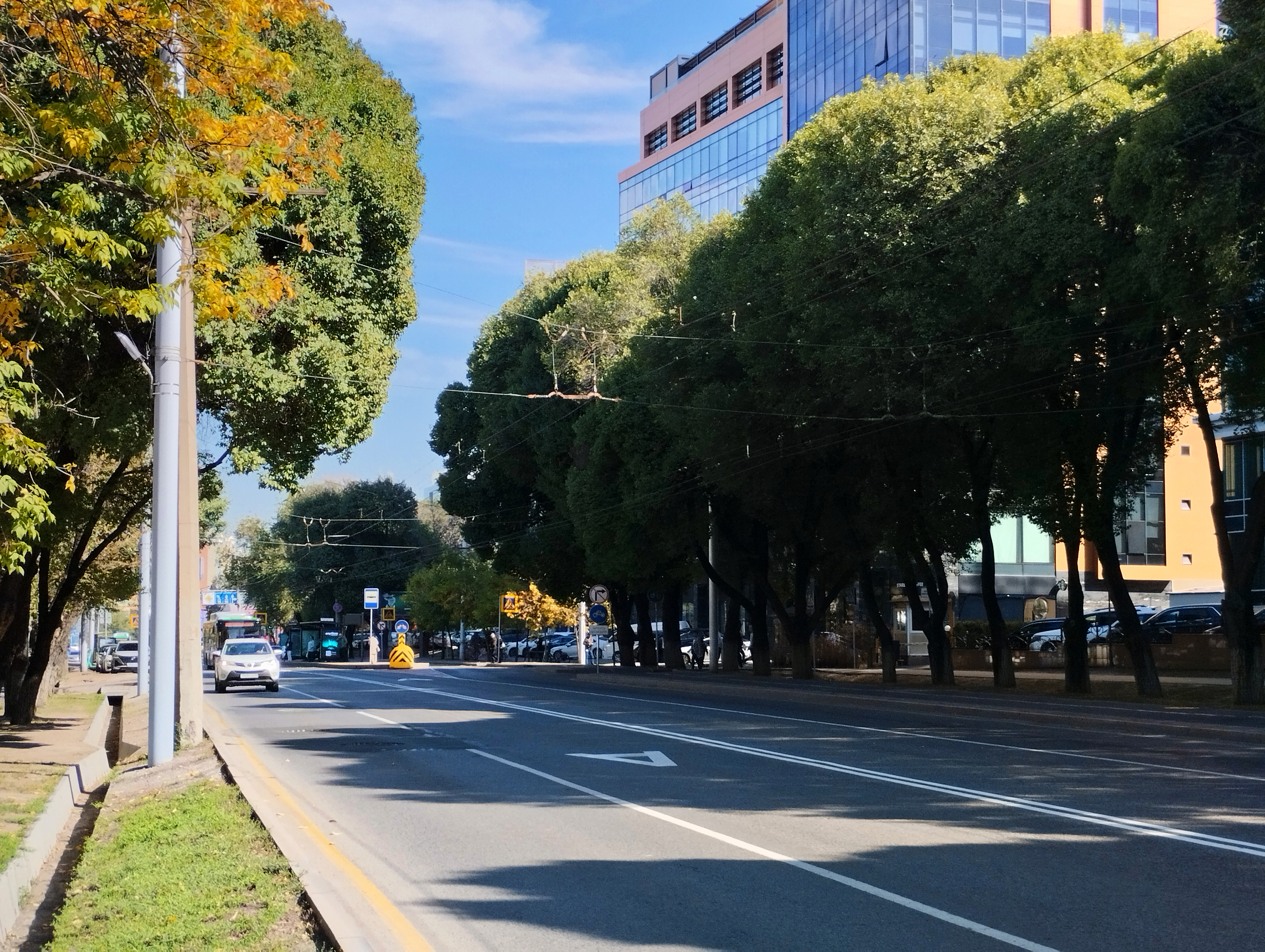
'Androssowii' along Timiryazev street in Almaty (2025)

== Synonymy ==
- Ulmus Androssowi: Litv. in Schedae ad Herbarium Florae Rossicae 8: 23, no. 2445, t.2, 1922.
- Ulmus pumila f. androssowii (Litv.) Rehd.

== Accessions ==
North America

- Morton Arboretum, Illinois, US. Acc. no. 353-72 (received as U. pumila f. androssowii (Litv.) Rehder).

Europe

- Grange Farm Arboretum, Sutton St James, Spalding, Lincolnshire, UK. Grafted cuttings acquired 2013. Acc. nos. 1095, 1096.
- Hortus Botanicus Nationalis, Salaspils, Latvia. Acc. nos. 18165, 18166 (as U. pumila f. androssowii, both from Moscow).
- Sir Harold Hillier Gardens, Romsey, UK. Acc. nos. 2016.0355, 2016.0356.

== Nurseries ==
Europe

- Pan-global Plants , Frampton on Severn, Gloucestershire, UK.

== Ulmus × androssowii ==
As the protologue (the first name used) for a hybrid of the U. minor × U. pumila group, Ulmus × androssowii is a valid group name for other crossings of these two species, whether wild or cultivated. The apparent uniformity of the cultivar 'Androssowii' makes it likely to be a single clone, Ulmus × androssowii 'Androssowii' (Richens called the cultivar 'Major' Ulmus × hollandica 'Hollandica'). In addition to the native range of this hybrid group in Central Asia, spontaneous hybridization of field elm and Siberian elm also occurs in Spain and Italy, where Siberian elm is naturalised. Kew, however, currently states (2025) that "The hybrid formula is U. minor × U. pumila", without citing a group name.

Cultivars include:

- 'Fiorente'
- 'Fuente Umbria'
- 'Karagatch'
- 'Recerta'
- 'Toledo'
- Morton Arboretum's U. carpinifolia x U. pumila, acc. 1946–24*1

Unnamed hybrids of this group have also been planted as street trees in northern Italy, where they show variable susceptibility to Dutch elm disease.
