= Ulmus × androssowii 'Fiorente' =

Elm cultivar

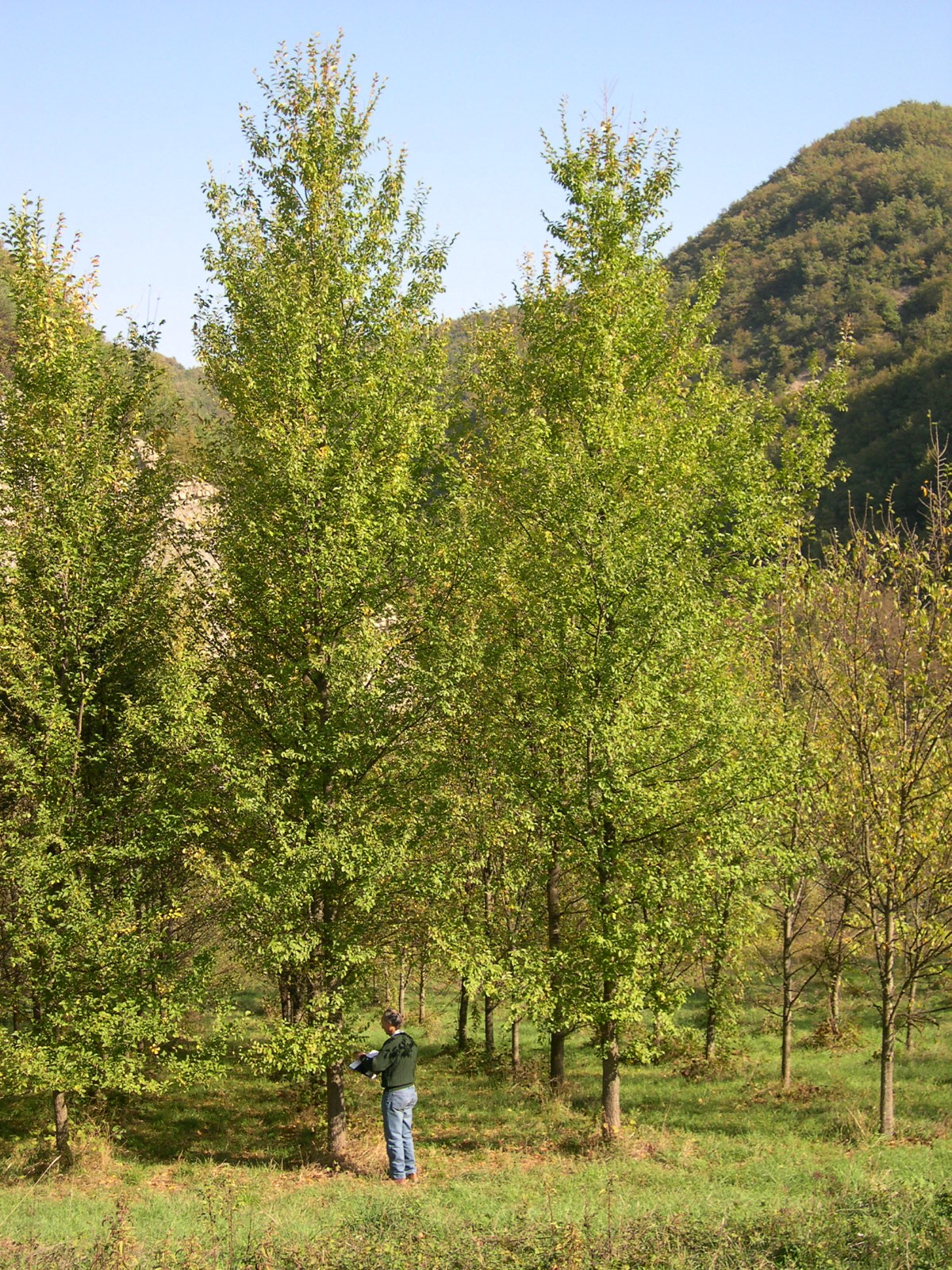
- 'Fiorente' in autumn, Apennines, Italy.
- Genus: Ulmus
- Hybrid parentage: U. pumila S.10 × U. minor C. 02
- Cultivar: 'Fiorente'
- Origin: IPP, Florence, Italy

The cultivar Ulmus × androssowii 'Fiorente' was derived from a crossing of the Siberian Elm Ulmus pumila clone 'S.10' (female parent) from Lucca, Italy, with the Ulmus minor clone 'C.02' from Lungarno, Florence, by the Istituto per la Protezione delle Piante (IPP), part of the Italian National Research Council, in Florence. The tree is protected by Plant Breeders' Rights bestowed by the EU on 25 March 2010.

'Fiorente' was introduced to the UK in 2007 by Hampshire & Isle of Wight Branch, Butterfly Conservation as part of its assessment of DED-resistant cultivars as potential hosts of the endangered White-letter Hairstreak.

== Description ==
'Fiorente' is usually monopodial, and capable of exceptionally rapid development; during trials in the Northern Apennine on poor clay soils, growth exceeded 1.0 m in height and 1.5 cm in trunk d.b.h per annum. The tree's habit is conical, with a pronounced apical dominance; lateral growth is limited, the crown therefore rather columnar. The alternate leaves are of moderate size, < 8 cm long × < 5 cm broad; generally lanceolate in shape, they are rough on the upper surface and pubescent beneath, remaining green well into the autumn and shed relatively late, often persisting into December in the UK. The tree usually commences flowering in its fourth or fifth year, during late February in Italy, but as early as mid-January in southern England. The sessile samarae are rounded, typically Ø15 mm, the seed central. The tree only suckers from the root where the root has been exposed and damaged.

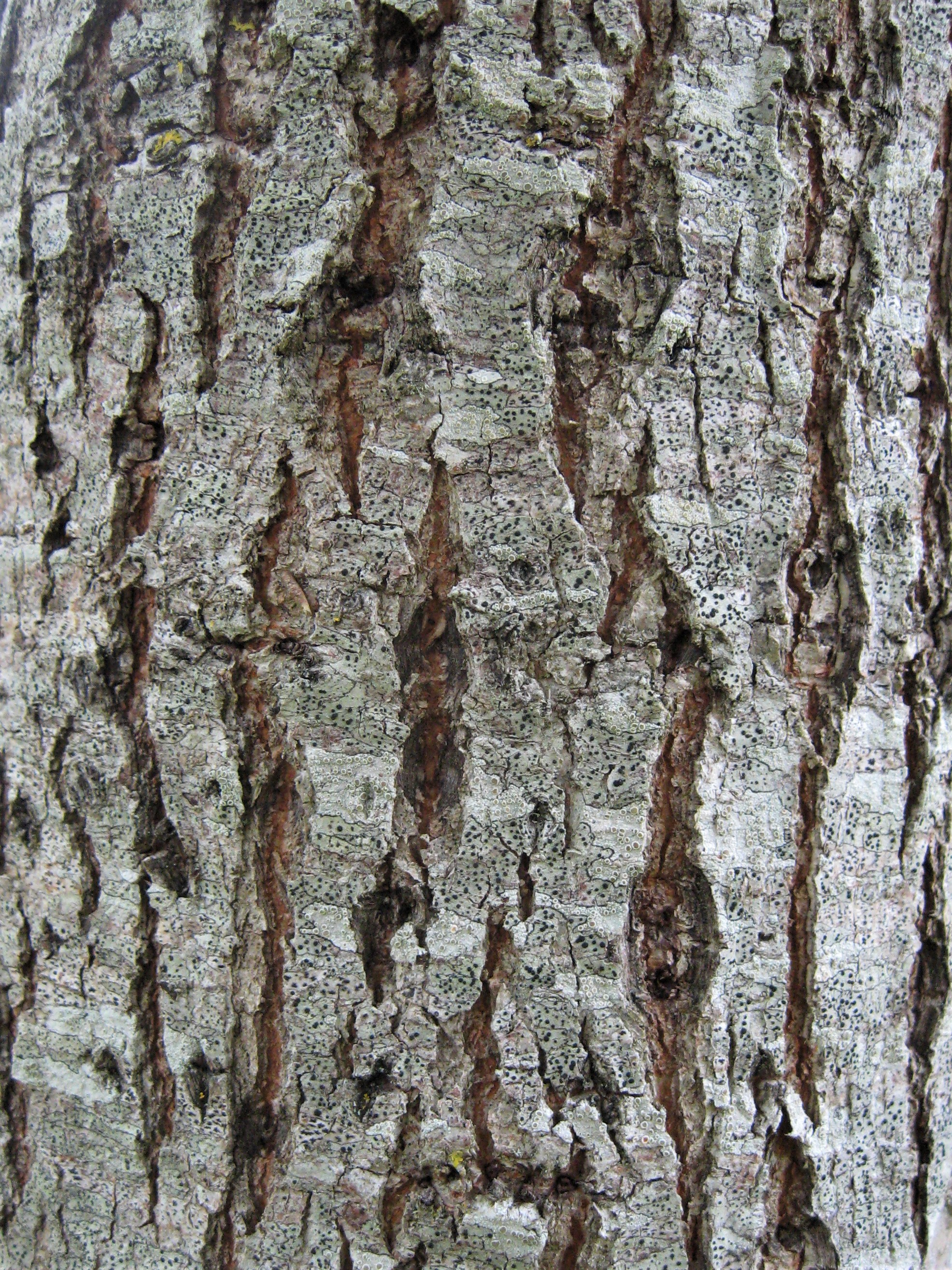
Bark of 20-year-old tree

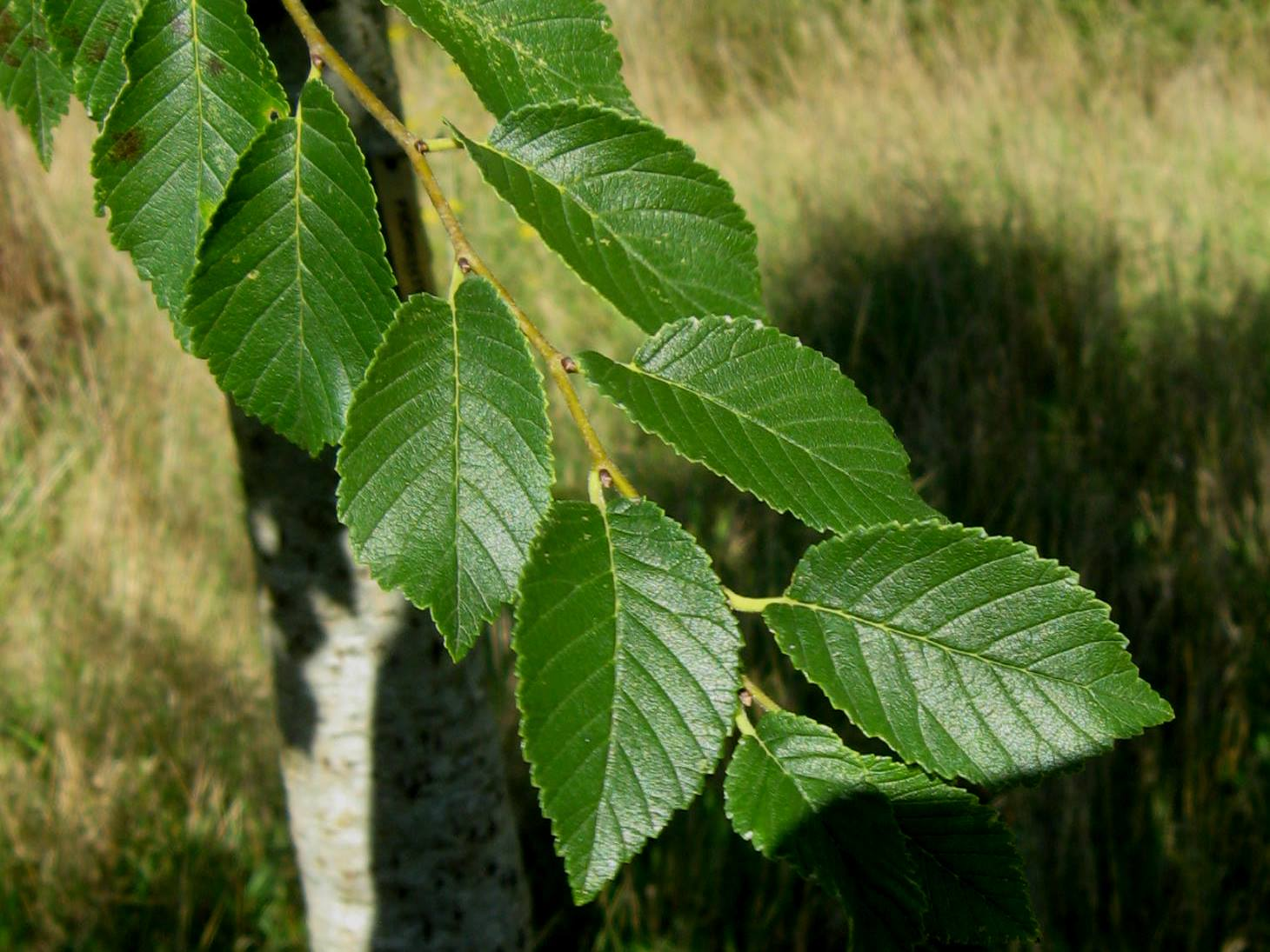
Leaves

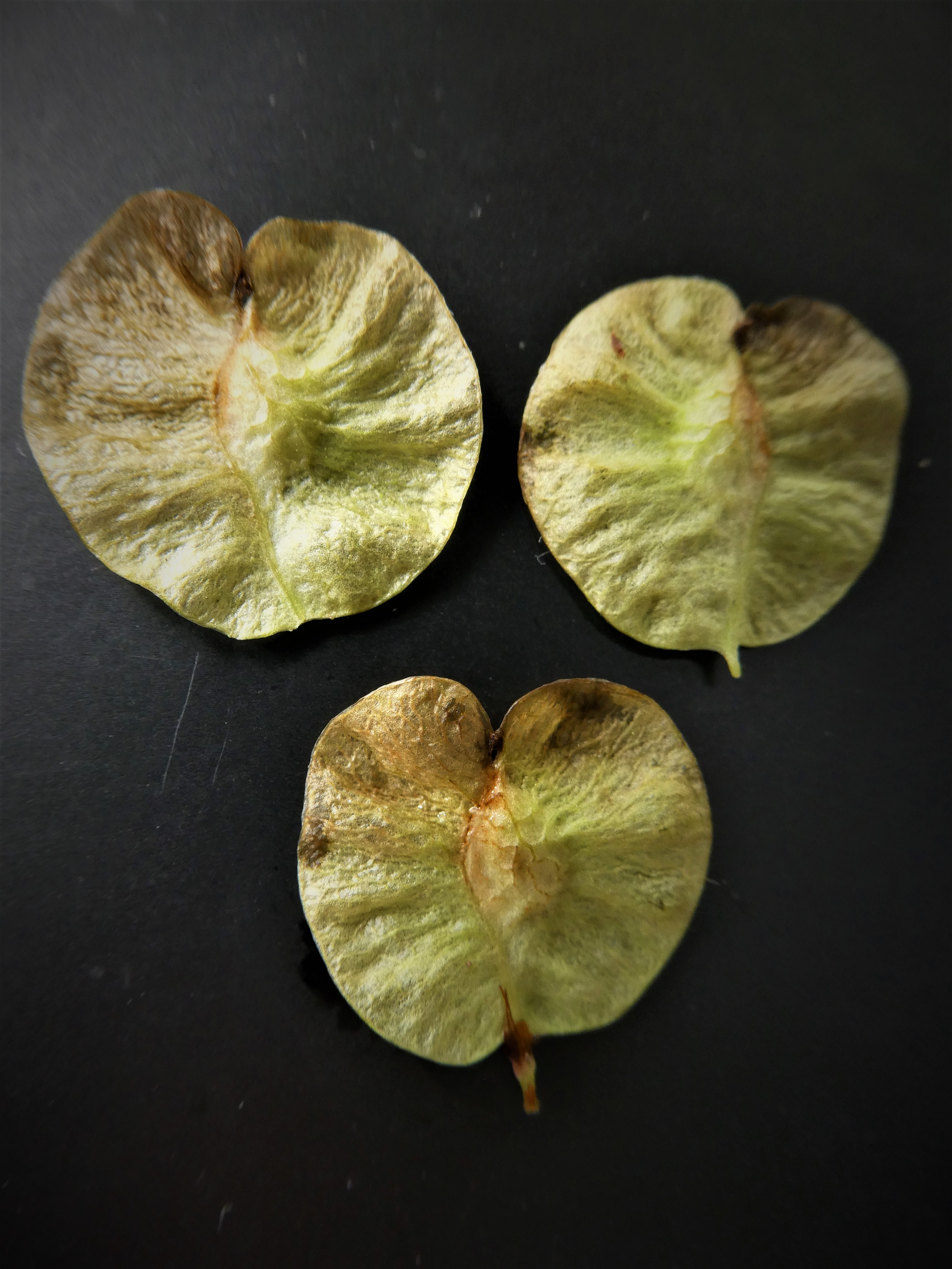
Samarae

== Pests and diseases ==
Tested by inoculation with unnaturally high concentrations of the fungal pathogen, 'Fiorente' revealed a good resistance to Dutch elm disease, sustaining 32% defoliation and 20% dieback; not as resistant as Lutèce (20% defoliation and 12% dieback), but significantly better than the older Dutch cultivars such as 'Lobel' (50% and 35.5% resp.) released in the early 1970s. Moreover, specimens in the field in Italy and England have exhibited no symptoms of DED or elm yellows; susceptibility to the elm leaf beetle Xanthogaleruca luteola is much the same as that of the Field Elm Ulmus minor.

== Cultivation ==
In Italy, the cultivar's rapid growth has bestowed it economic potential as a hardwood timber and biomass tree. However, its attractive, compact, form has seen it exclusively propagated and marketed as a root-balled street tree by the Eisele nursery in Darmstadt, Germany, as one of its 'Resista' series, and consequently it has never been available as a small bare-root whip as demanded by forestry. It was introduced to southern England in 2007 by Butterfly Conservation. There is a specimen by the Flower Walk, Kensington Gardens, near the Albert Memorial. The largest planting in the UK was at Woodend, West Walk, Wickham, in 2019, when 70 were planted to commemorate the centenary of the Forestry Commission.

'Fiorente' has been planted in the Netherlands, notably among the line of 140 elms on the ‘s-Gravelandsevaartweg, Loosdrecht (ten trees, planted 2016), part of Wijdemeren City Council's elm collection, assembled since 2003 by tree manager Martin Tijdgat and his colleagues. It has also been planted in De Lairessestraat, Amsterdam, as a resistant alternative to 'Sarniensis'.

'Fiorente' is not known to have been introduced to North America or Australasia.

== Etymology ==
'Fiorente' translates as 'flourishing'.

== Accessions ==
=== Europe ===
- Grange Farm Arboretum, Sutton St. James, Spalding, UK. Acc. no. 693.
- Great Fontley Farm, Fareham, UK. Butterfly Conservation Elm Trials plantation, two trees planted 2007.
- Royal Botanic Garden Edinburgh, UK. Acc. no. 20080340, 20180332
- Royal Botanic Gardens, Kew, UK. Acc. no. not known.
- Sir Harold Hillier Gardens, Ampfield, UK. Acc. no. 2008.0367

== Nurseries ==
=== Europe ===
- Boomkwekerij Ebben, Cuijk, Netherlands
- Eisele GmbH, Darmstadt, Germany
- Hillier Nurseries, Ampfield, UK
