= Ulmus 'Karagatch' =

Elm cultivar

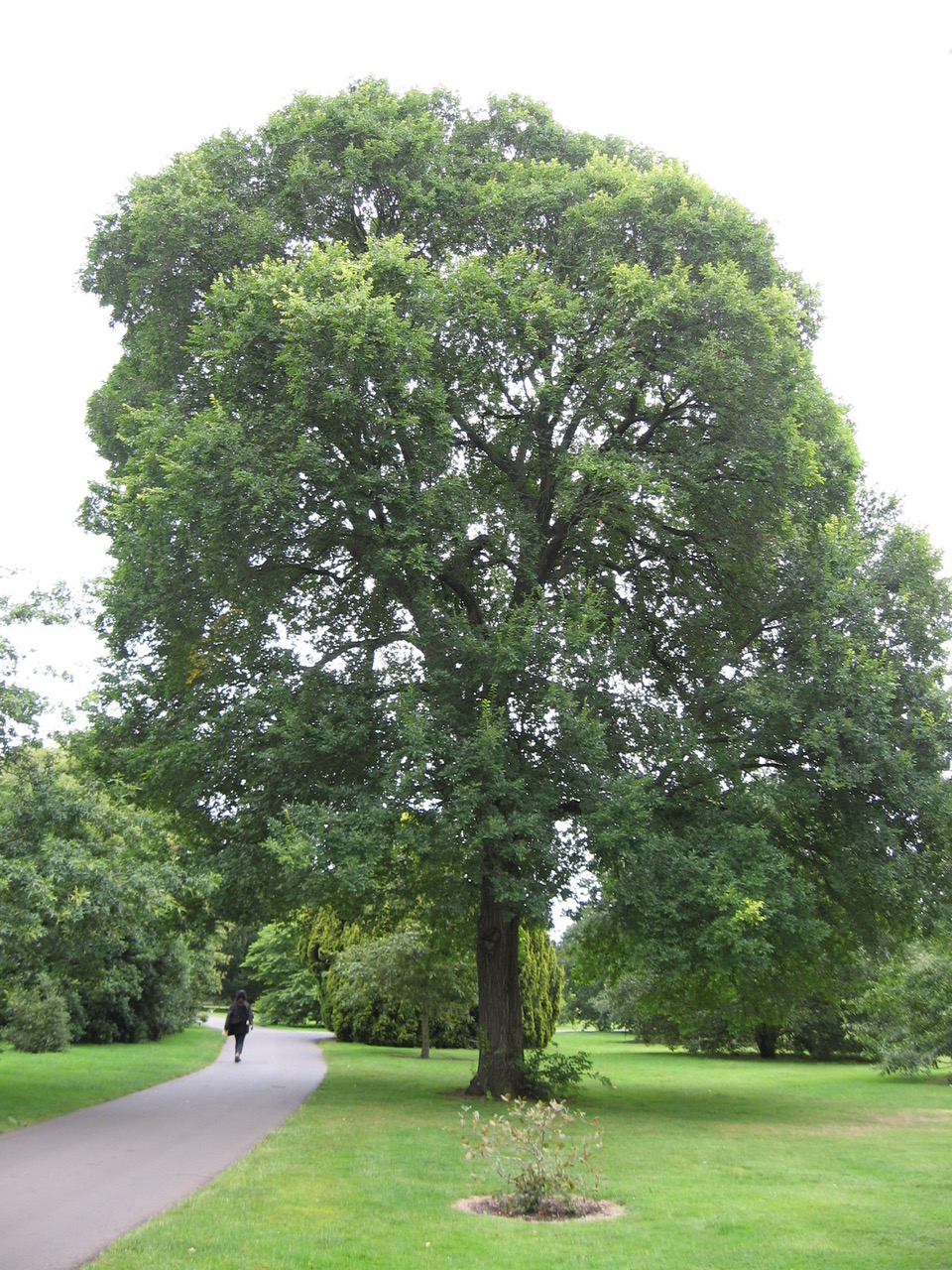
- 'Karagatch' at Kew Gardens, 2007
- Genus: Ulmus
- Hybrid parentage: U. pumila × U. 'Androssowii'?
- Cultivar: 'Karagatch'
- Origin: Kazakhstan

Ulmus 'Karagatch' is a hybrid cultivar from Turkestan (from a region now part of Turkmenistan), selected in the early 20th century and considered either a backcrossing of U. × androssowii and U. pumila, or simply a cultivar of × androssowii. It was grown from seeds, introduced from Bairam Ali in Russian Turkestan by Arthur P. Davis in the 1930s, as U. 'Karagatch', under which name it was planted at Kew.

== Description ==
The Kew specimen had the appearance of a northern European field elm, more tall than broad. 'Karagatch' was described by the US Department of Agriculture (1917) as a "rapid-growing elm", suitable for semi-arid regions, with harder wood than that of American elm.

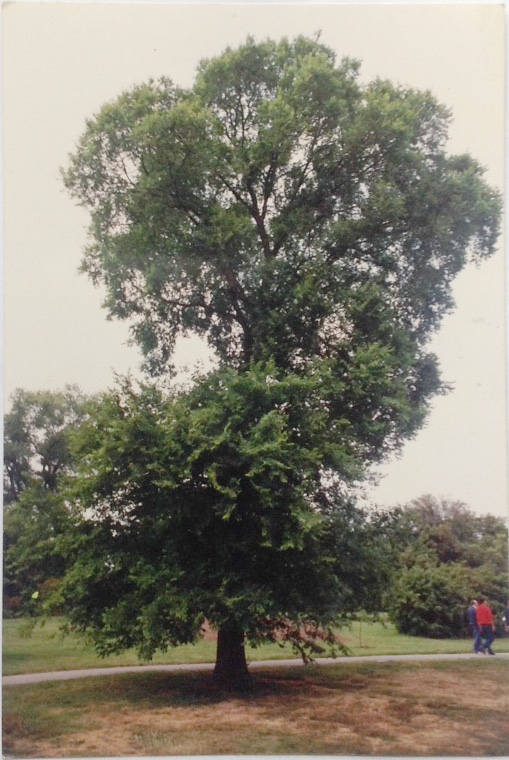
'Karagatch' at Kew Gardens, 1990

== Pests and diseases ==
In inoculation tests at Noordplant Nurseries in Glimmen, the resistance of this cultivar to Dutch elm disease proved "better than that of 'Lobel'."

== Cultivation ==
'Karagatch' was present at Kew and in The Hague from the early 1930s. The Kew specimen was felled in 2015 as 'unsafe'. It was cloned and remains in cultivation (see 'Accessions').

Specimens of 'Karagatch', propagated from the Kew tree, have been planted in the Netherlands, notably among the line of 140 elms on the ‘s-Gravelandsevaartweg, Loosdrecht (five trees along the cycle-path, southern end of ‘s-Gravelandsevaartweg, planted 2016), part of Wijdemeren City Council's elm collection, assembled since 2003 by tree manager Martin Tijdgat and his colleagues. At the Noordplant Nurseries 'Karagatch' showed strong growth, while on the sandy verge in Oud-Loosdrecht, in wet soil, they exhibit vigour, with branches of up to 1.5 m in a single growing season.

== Etymology ==
The name 'karagatch' (:'black tree' in the Turkic languages, widely used for 'elm') has historically also been applied to U. minor 'Umbraculifera' (syn. U. densa) from the same region , and more loosely to field elm found in Turkey and to U. pumila found in Mongolia.

== Accessions ==
=== North America ===
- Morton Arboretum, US. As Ulmus × androssowii × U. pumila hybrid. Acc. no. 353–72

=== Europe ===
- Grange Farm Arboretum, Lincolnshire, UK. Acc. details not known.
