= Ulmus × androssowii 'Toledo' =

Elm cultivar

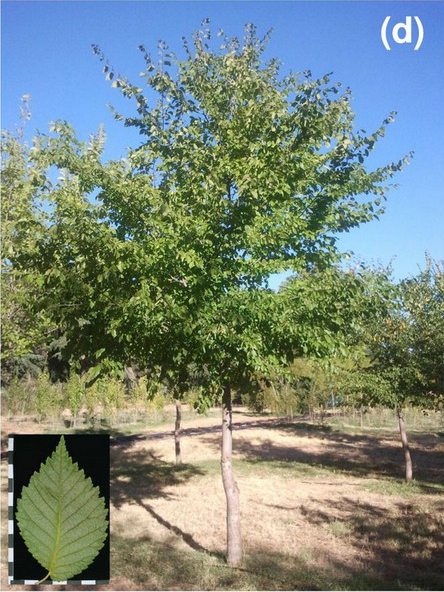
- Ulmus × androssowii 'Toledo'
- Genus: Ulmus
- Hybrid parentage: U. pumila × U. minor
- Cultivar: 'Toledo'
- Origin: Spain

The cultivar Ulmus × androssowii 'Toledo' was raised from seed collected in 1999 from a tree originally believed to be Ulmus minor growing in the eponymous city (39°51′51″N 4°1′30″W), by researchers at the Escuela Técnica Superior de Ingenieros de Montes, Universidad Politėcnica de Madrid. However, retrospective DNA analysis revealed that the clone also had Ulmus pumila DNA, the species introduced to Spain at the end of the 16th century, and has consequently been dropped from the research programme.

'Toledo' was introduced to the UK in 2020 as part of an assessment by Butterfly Conservation of DED-resistant cultivars as potential hosts of the endangered White-letter Hairstreak.

== Description ==
'Toledo' grew at a comparatively fast rate of 89 cm per annum in the trials at Puerta de Hierro, Madrid. The erect branches form an irregular crown and are devoid of corky tissue. The leaves, on 6 mm petioles, are ovate, typically acuminate at the apex, the average length and width 47 × 27 mm, the margins doubly serrate. Foliar density relative to 'Sapporo Autumn Gold' is described as 'high'. In the Madrid study, the appearance of the tree was rated 2.9 / 5. The leaves flush in early April (week 14) in southern England.

== Pests & diseases ==
'Toledo' was found to have a very high resistance to Dutch Elm Disease Ophiostoma novo-ulmi, on a par with, if not greater than, the hybrid cultivar 'Sapporo Autumn Gold' when inoculated with the pathogen in Madrid.

== Accessions ==
Europe

- Grange Farm Arboretum, Lincolnshire, UK. Acc. no. not known.
