= Ulmus × androssowii 'Fuente Umbria' =

Elm cultivar

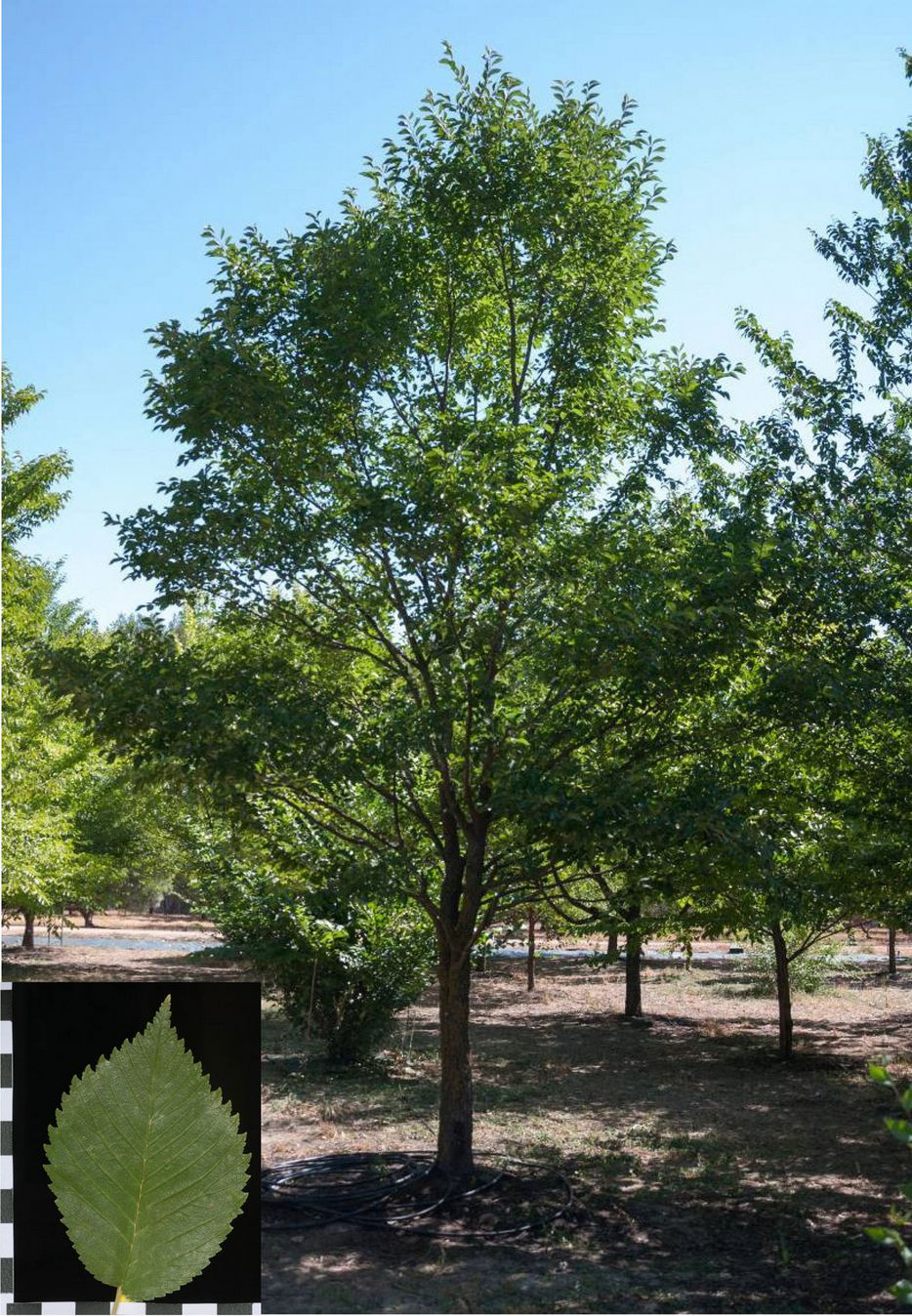
- Ulmus × androssowii 'Fuente Umbria'
- Genus: Ulmus
- Hybrid parentage: U. pumila × U. minor
- Cultivar: 'Fuente Umbria'
- Origin: Spain

The cultivar Ulmus × androssowii 'Fuente Umbria' was raised from seed collected in 1995 from an elm resembling Ulmus minor growing in a field at Fuente Umbria west of Valencia (39°25′23″N 0°56′46″W), by researchers at the Escuela Técnica Superior de Ingenieros de Montes, Universidad Politėcnica de Madrid. 'Fuente Umbria' is one of seven cultivars found to have a very high resistance to Dutch Elm Disease, on a par with, if not greater than, the hybrid cultivar 'Sapporo Autumn Gold' when inoculated with the pathogen Ophiostoma novo-ulmi in Madrid. However, retrospective DNA analysis has revealed that the clone has Ulmus pumila DNA, the species introduced to Spain at the end of the 16th century, and has consequently been dropped from the programme.

'Fuente Umbria' was introduced to the UK in 2017, by Hampshire & Isle of Wight Branch, Butterfly Conservation, as part of an assessment of DED-resistant cultivars as potential hosts of the endangered White-letter Hairstreak but has not prospered in the south Hampshire environment, where growth has been minimal.

== Description ==
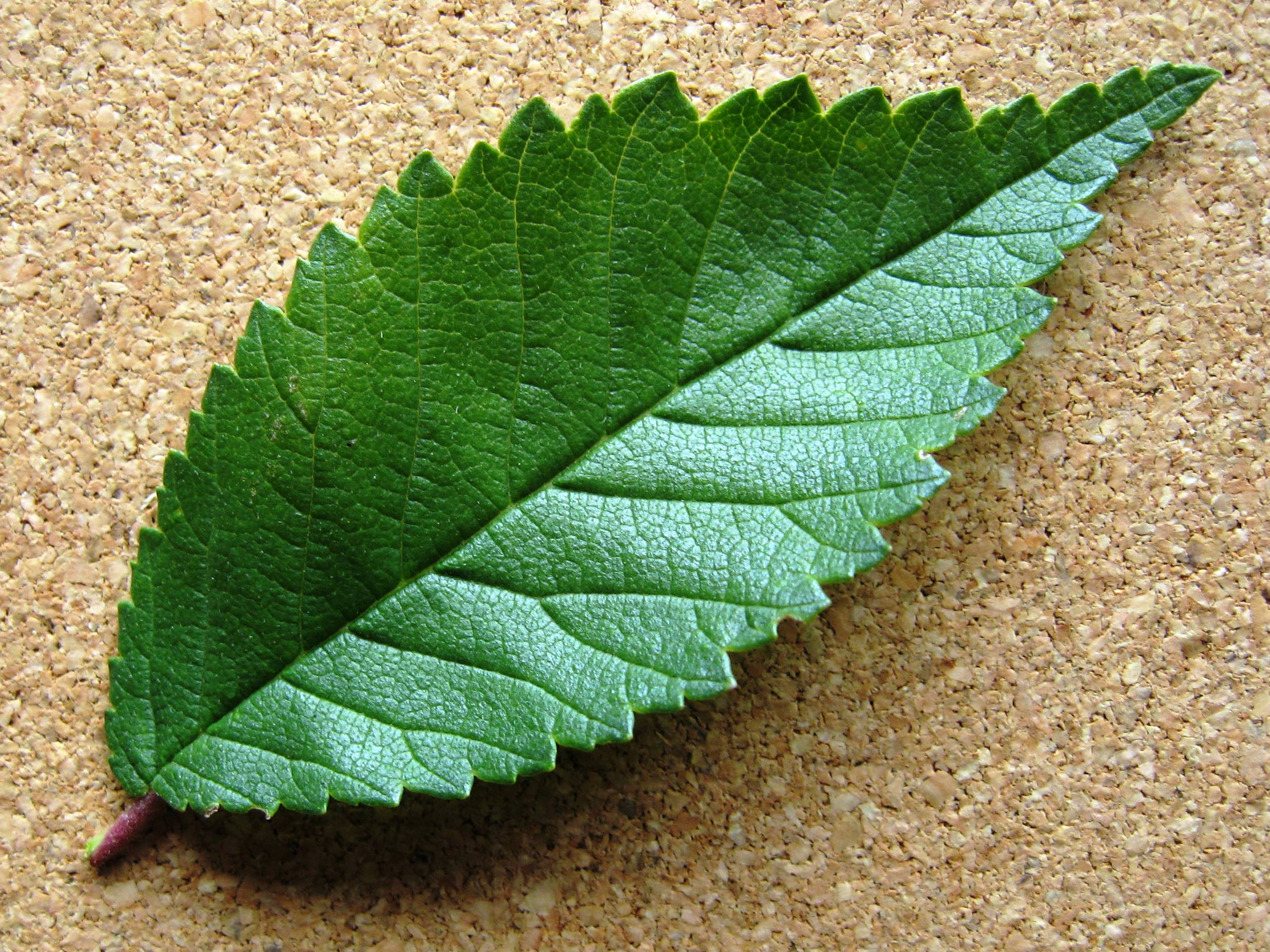

'Fuente Umbria' is comparatively slow growing, achieving a rate of 52 cm per annum in the trials at Puerta de Hierro, Madrid. The branches, which have corky tissue, are erect, forming an irregular crown. The leaves, on 10 mm petioles, are ovate, typically acuminate at the apex, the average length and width 76 × 45 mm, the margins doubly serrate. Foliar density relative to 'Sapporo Autumn Gold' is described as 'medium'. The leaves are the first to flush of the seven Madrid clones where grown in southern England, in mid March.

== Cultivation ==
The cultivar has been evaluated at four sites across Spain, while specimens were planted in England in 2017 at Butterfly Conservation's elm trial plantations in Hampshire, and at Grange Farm Arboretum, Lincolnshire.

== Accessions ==
=== Europe ===
- Grange Farm Arboretum, Lincolnshire, UK. Acc. no. 1266. One small whip planted 2017.
