= Ulmus 'Koopmannii' =

Elm cultivar

- 'Koopmannii' at Arnold Arboretum, 1941
- Genus: Ulmus
- Cultivar: 'Koopmannii'
- Origin: Turkestan

The elm cultivar Ulmus 'Koopmannii' was cloned from a specimen raised from seed sent from Margilan, Turkestan (now in eastern Uzbekistan) by Koopmann to the Botanischer Garten Berlin c. 1880. Noted in 1881 as a 'new elm', it was later listed by the Späth nursery (Berlin, Germany), catalogue no. 62, p. 6. 101, 1885, as Ulmus Koopmannii, and later by Krüssmann in 1962 as a cultivar of U. minor. Margilan is beyond the main range of Ulmus minor. Augustine Henry, who saw the specimens in Berlin and Kew, believed Koopmann's Elm to be a form of Ulmus pumila (Siberian elm), a view not shared by Rehder of the Arbold Arboretum. Ascherson & Graebner said the tree produced 'very numerous root shoots', which suggests it may be a cultivar of U. minor. Until DNA analysis can confirm its origin, the cultivar is now treated as Ulmus 'Koopmannii'.

== Description ==
The tree is said to resemble Ulmus minor 'Umbraculifera' in form, though more globose in outline, with a dense, narrowish oval crown, a height to 35 feet (11 m), and small, ovate leaves < 30 mm in length. When grafted, the tree has an ovoid head but is shrubby and stoloniferous when propagated by cuttings.

== Cultivation ==
Koopman claimed that 'Koopmannii' was traditionally grown in cemeteries in Turkestan, where it occasionally reached a great size, In the late 19th and early 20th century it was marketed in Europe by Späth, and was represented by a tree in the Berlin Botanical Garden. One tree was planted in 1897 as U. campestris Koopmannii at the Dominion Arboretum, Ottawa, Canada. The tree was introduced to the US in the late 19th century, appearing as a "new variety" in the 1897 catalogue of the Mount Hope Nursery (also known as Ellwanger and Barry) of Rochester, New York. A specimen was once grown at Kew Gardens, where it performed rather poorly. Specimens supplied by Späth to the RBGE in 1902 as U. campestris 'Koopmannii' may survive in Edinburgh as it was the practice of the Garden to distribute trees about the city (viz. the Wentworth Elm); the current list of Living Accessions held in the Garden per se does not list the plant. U. campestris 'Koopmannii' was marketed in the 1930s by the Hesse Nursery of Weener, Germany.

== Synonymy ==
- Ulmus carpinifolia 'Koopmannii': Morton Arboretum catalogue, 2006.

== Accessions ==
=== North America ===
- Morton Arboretum, US. Acc. no. 465–72 (as U. carpinifolia (: minor) Koopmannii, Koopmann's Smooth-leaved Elm
- Dominion Arboretum, Canada. Accession no. 2569

=== Europe ===
- Hortus Botanicus Nationalis, Salaspils, Latvia. acc. no. 18145
