= Dmitry Litvinov =

Russian botanist (1854–1929)

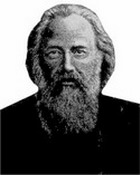
Dmitry Ivanovich Litvinov.

Dmitry Ivanovich Litvinov (Russian: Дмитрий Иванович Литвинов; 29 December 1854 [O.S. 17 December 1854] – 5 July 1929) was a Russian botanist responsible for the naming of a large variety of East European and Asian plants. He is known as the author of the concept of glacial refugia for the plants growing on chalk and limestone slopes of the banks of rivers in the European part of Russia. Together with Vasily Zinger, he discovered the natural monument Galichya Gora in Central Russia (river Don) inhabited by relict plants.

He graduated from the Imperial Moscow Technical School in 1879, receiving the degree of a construction mechanic specialist. Interested in botany, in 1898 he quit his job as a teacher at a technical school and became a curator and later a senior botanist at the Botanical Museum of the Academy of Sciences, where he worked until the end of his life.

From 1901 until 1922, Litvinov was the editor of two succeeding exsiccatae under the title Herbarium Florae Rossicae.

Alternative spelling of the names: Dimitri Ivanovitch Litvinov (in French); Dmitrij Iwanowitsch Litwinow (in German).
