= Emer (female name) =

Emer /ˈiːmər/ is a female given name derived from Emer, who in the Ulster Cycle of Irish mythology was the wife of the hero Cú Chulainn. As a given name it became popular during the Irish literary revival, with the Old Irish spelling Emer of the mythical character retained in English with anglicised pronunciation. The modern Irish spelling is Eimhear or Éimhear, with variations Eimer, Eimear and Éimear. The Scottish Gaelic spelling is Eimhir.

The Irish male name Éibhear was sometimes also spelled Emer; it is usually anglicised Heber. For example, some sources refer to 17th-century bishop Heber MacMahon as "Emer MacMahon". Similarly, the Irish writer Eimar O'Duffy (1893–1935) was male.

Women named Emer or modern Irish equivalents include the following (Irish unless stated):

- Eimear Brannigan (born 1980), Dublin camogie player
- Eimear Burke, psychologist, musician, and Chosen Chief of the Order of Bards, Ovates and Druids
- Emer Colleran (1945–2018), microbiologist
- Eimear Considine (born 1991), rugby player
- Emer Cooke (born 1961), pharmacist and executive director of the European Medicines Agency
- Emer Costello (born 1962) Labour Party former Dublin Lord Mayor and MEP
- Emer Currie (born 1979), Fine Gael Dublin West TD
- Emer Dillon (born 1983 or 1984), Cork camogie player
- Emer Haverty (born c.1987), Galway camogie player
- Emer Higgins (born 1986), Fine Gael Dublin Mid-West TD
- Emer Jones (born 1994), Young Scientist of the Year 2008
- Eimear Kenny, researcher in population genetics and translation genomics
- Emer Kenny, British actress and screenwriter
- Eimear Lambe (born 1997), rower
- Emer Lucey (born 1988), hockey player
- Eimear McBride (born 1976), novelist
- Eimear McDonnell, Tipperary camogie player
- Eimear McGeown (born 1983), flautist
- Emer McLysaght (born 1980), journalist and co-author of the Aisling novels
- Eimear Maher (born 2003), middle-distance runner
- Emer Martin (born 1972), novelist, painter and film-maker
- Eimear Moran (born 1984), cyclist and rower
- Eimear Mullan (born 1982), triathlete
- Eimear Ní Chonaola (born 1977), journalist and television presenter
- Eimer Ní Mhaoldomhnaigh, costume designer
- Eímear Noone, conductor and composer
- Emer O'Brien, artist and photographer
- Eimear O'Grady, stuntwoman
- Eimear O'Kane, film producer
- Emer O'Toole, feminist scholar and writer
- Emer Patten, live music film producer
- Eimear Quinn (born 1972), singer and composer, Eurovision Song Contest 1996 winner
- Emer Reynolds, film editor and director
- Eimear Richardson (born 1986), cricketer
- Eimear Ryan, writer, editor, and publisher
- Eimear Walshe, contemporary artist and writer
