= Hever =

Hever may refer to:

== Places ==
- Hever, Kent, a village and civil parish in the Sevenoaks District of Kent, England
  - Hever Castle, Hever, Kent
  - Hever railway station, near Hever, Kent
- Hever, Belgium, a small village in the center of Flanders, Belgium
- Merkaz Hever, a communal settlement in Israel
- Hévér, the Hungarian name for Iertof village, Vrani Commune, Caraş-Severin County, Romania

== People ==
- Guy Hever (1977–possibly 1997 or after), Israeli soldier who disappeared
- Harold Hever (1895–1958), English cricketer
- Julieanna Hever, American dietician
- Norman Hever (1924–1987), English cricketer

== See also ==
- Heber (disambiguation)
- Nahal Hever, a stream in the Judean Desert
