= Emer (disambiguation) =

Emer was the daughter of Forgall Monach and the wife of the hero Cú Chulainn in the Ulster Cycle of Irish mythology

Emer or EMER may also refer to:

== People ==
- Given name:
  - Emer (female name), Irish name derived from the mythological figure
  - Emer, variant of Éibhear, Irish male name
  - Emerich, sometimes abbreviated Emer
    - Emer de Vattel (1714–1767) French philosopher, diplomat, and jurist
  - Emer, Jaredite king in the Book of Mormon; see List of Book of Mormon people § E
- Surname:
  - Joel Emer (born 1954), microprocessor architect and computer performance analyst
  - Michel Emer (Emer Rosenstein; 1906–1984), French songwriter

== Other ==
- LÉ Emer, 1978–2013 offshore patrol vessel of the Irish Naval Service
  - Emer-class offshore patrol vessel, eponymous Irish Naval Service class
- EMER-K1, bullpup assault rifle made in Myanmar
- Emer (Shadow World), a continent on Kulthea in the Shadow World role-playing game campaign setting
- Emer Bog and Baddesley Common, nature reserve north of North Baddesley, Hampshire, UK

== See also ==
- Cultivars of the Chinese Elm (Ulmus parvifolia):
  - Emer I, "Emerald Isle"
  - Emer II, "Emerald Vase"
