= Herbers =

Herbers is a surname. Notable people with the surname include:

- Fabian Herbers (born 1993), German footballer
- Ian Herbers (born 1967), Canadian ice hockey player and coach
- John Herbers (1923–2017), American journalist, author, editor, and veteran
- Katja Herbers (born 1980), Dutch actress

== See also ==
- Herber
- Herbés
