= Compensatory education =

Educational programmes to offset disadvantage

Compensatory education offers supplementary programs or services designed to help children at risk of cognitive impairment and low educational achievement succeed.

== Children at risk of disadvantages ==
Poor children do worse in school than their well-off peers. They are more likely to experience learning disabilities and developmental delays. Poor children score between 6 and 13 points lower on various standardized tests of IQ, verbal ability, and achievement. Poverty also has a negative impact on high-school graduation and college attendance. Children raised by a single parent, children who have more than two siblings, children of teenaged parents and children raised in poverty-stricken neighbourhoods are also at risk of low academic achievement.

== How to help these children ==
Numerous programs have been created in order to help children at risk reach their full potential. Among the American programs of compensary education are Head Start, the Chicago Child-Parent Center Program, High/Scope, Abecedarian Early Intervention Project, SMART (Start Making a Reader Today), the Milwaukee Project and the 21st Century Community Learning Center. In Germany and Great Britain, Early Excellence Centres are widely discussed programs of compensatory education. Not all of the programs have been proven to be effective. However scientists were able to identify social programmes that work. Among these are the High/Scope Perry Preschool Project, the Abecedarian Project, and SMART.

== See also ==
- Poverty in the United States
- Poverty in the United Kingdom
- Remedial education
