= Heber (given name) =

Heber (/ˈhiːbər/) is both an Irish masculine given name, Galician (grandson of Breogan) and an etymologically unrelated Biblical name. The Irish name is an Anglicisation of the Irish Gaelic Éibhear. The Biblical name means "enclave" in Hebrew; and was used by several minor characters in the Bible.

People bearing the name include:

- Heber Blankenhorn (1884–1956), American journalist, psychological warfare innovator, US Army colonel and union activist
- Heber Doust Curtis (1872–1942), American astronomer
- Heber J. Grant (1856–1945), seventh President of the Church of Jesus Christ of Latter-day Saints
- Heber Jentzsch (1935–2026), American Church of Scientology executive
- Heber C. Kimball (1801–1868), Apostle in the Church of Jesus Christ of Latter-day Saints
- Héber Araujo dos Santos (born 1991), Brazilian footballer
- Heber Slatter (1887–1918), English amateur footballer

== See also ==
- List of Irish-language given names
- Herber
