= Ulmus 'Rebella' =

Elm cultivar

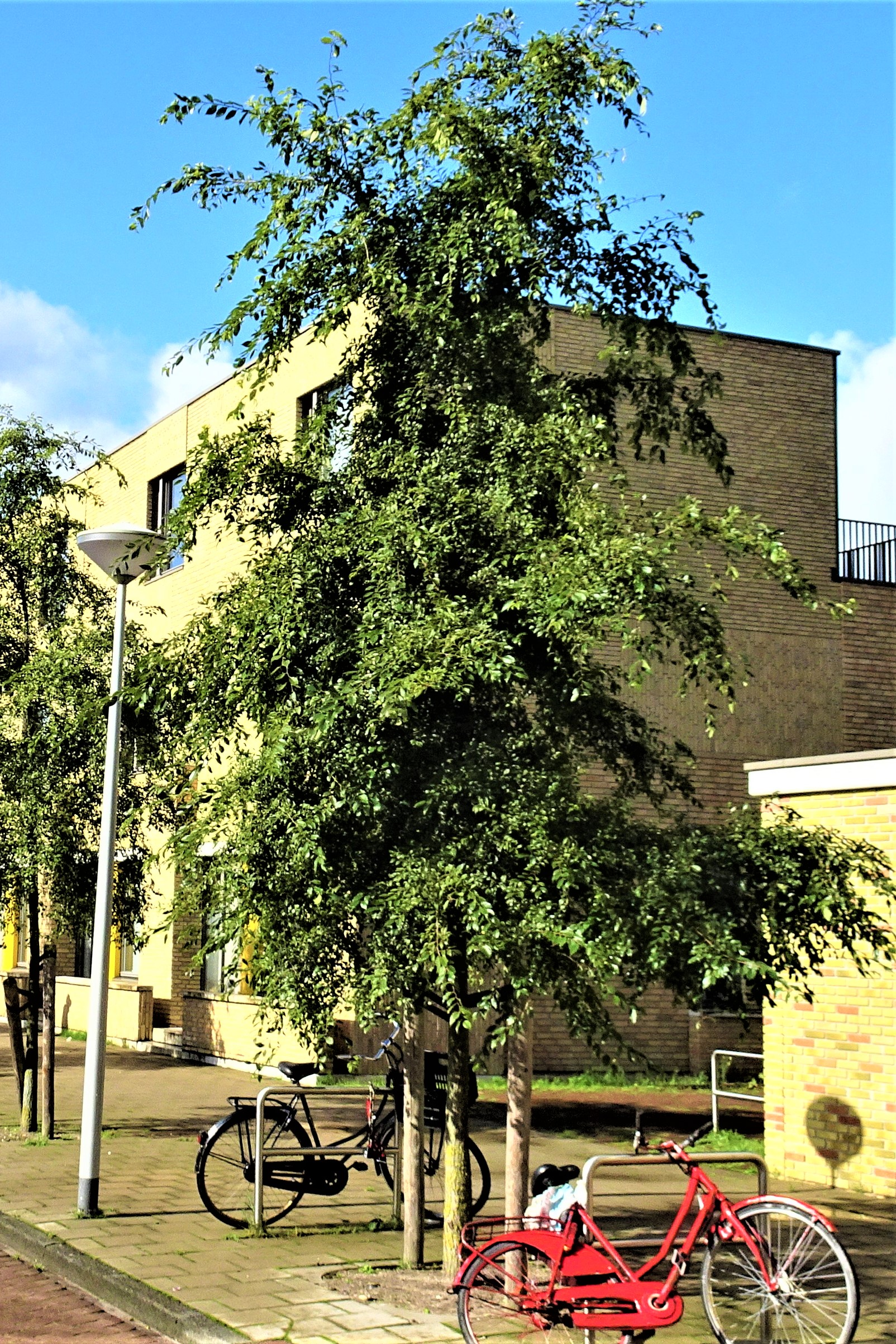
- Ulmus 'Rebella', Amsterdam
- Genus: Ulmus
- Hybrid parentage: U. parvifolia × U. americana
- Cultivar: 'Rebella'
- Origin: US

Ulmus 'Rebella' is an American hybrid cultivar elm raised from a rare crossing of the Chinese elm U. parvifolia (female parent) and the American elm U. americana by Professors Eugene Smalley and Raymond Guries of the Wisconsin Alumni Research Foundation in 1987 as clone 2245-9. Grown under licence by Eisele GmbH, Darmstadt, Germany, 'Rebella' was released to commerce in Europe in 2011.

== Description ==
'Rebella' is a small to medium size, slow-growing tree with a graceful loose crown, rather dense epicormic foliage, and pendent branches and twigs, bearing small glossy leaves which can turn brown, red, orange, or yellow in autumn, depending on the weather.

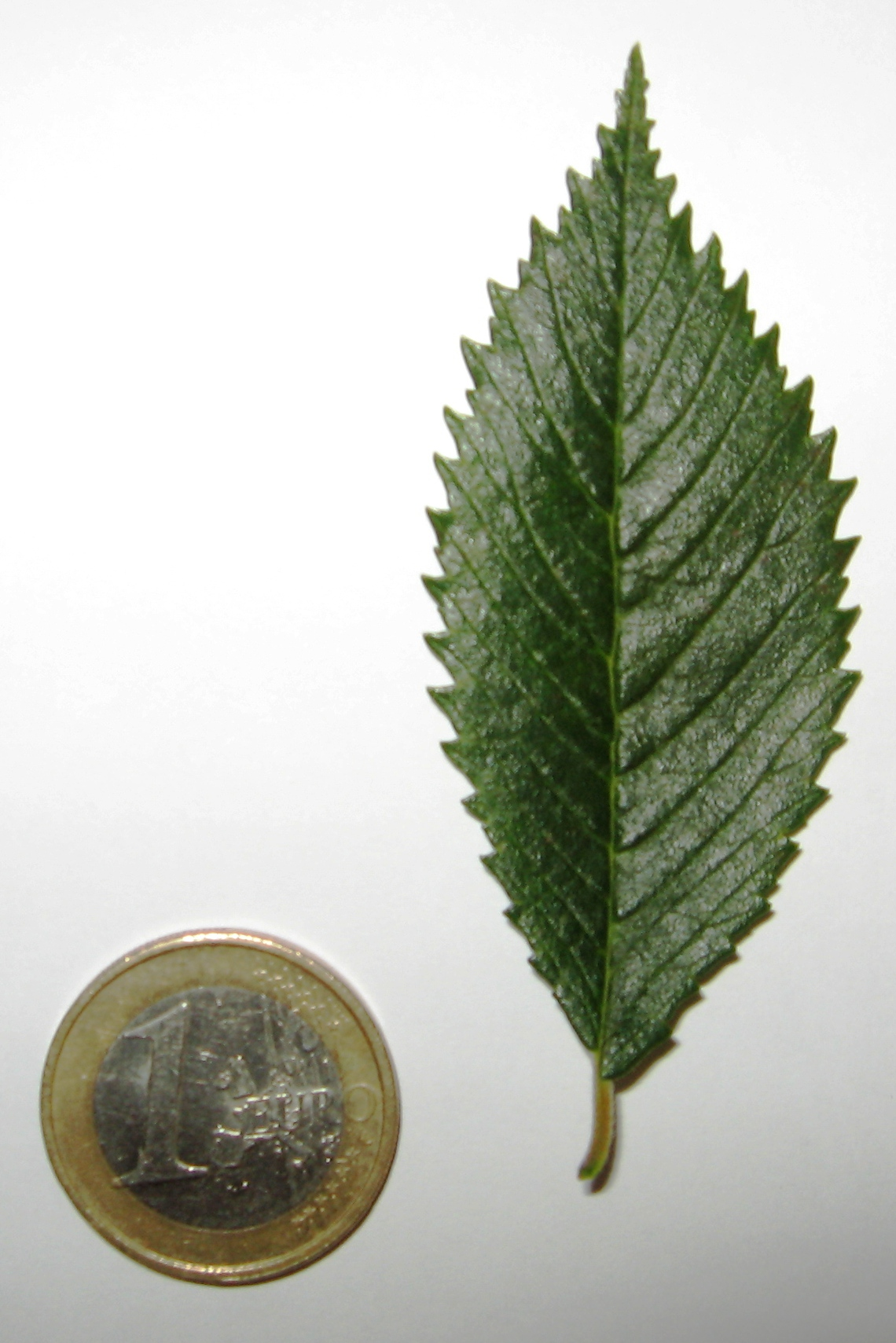
Leaf & 1 Euro coin

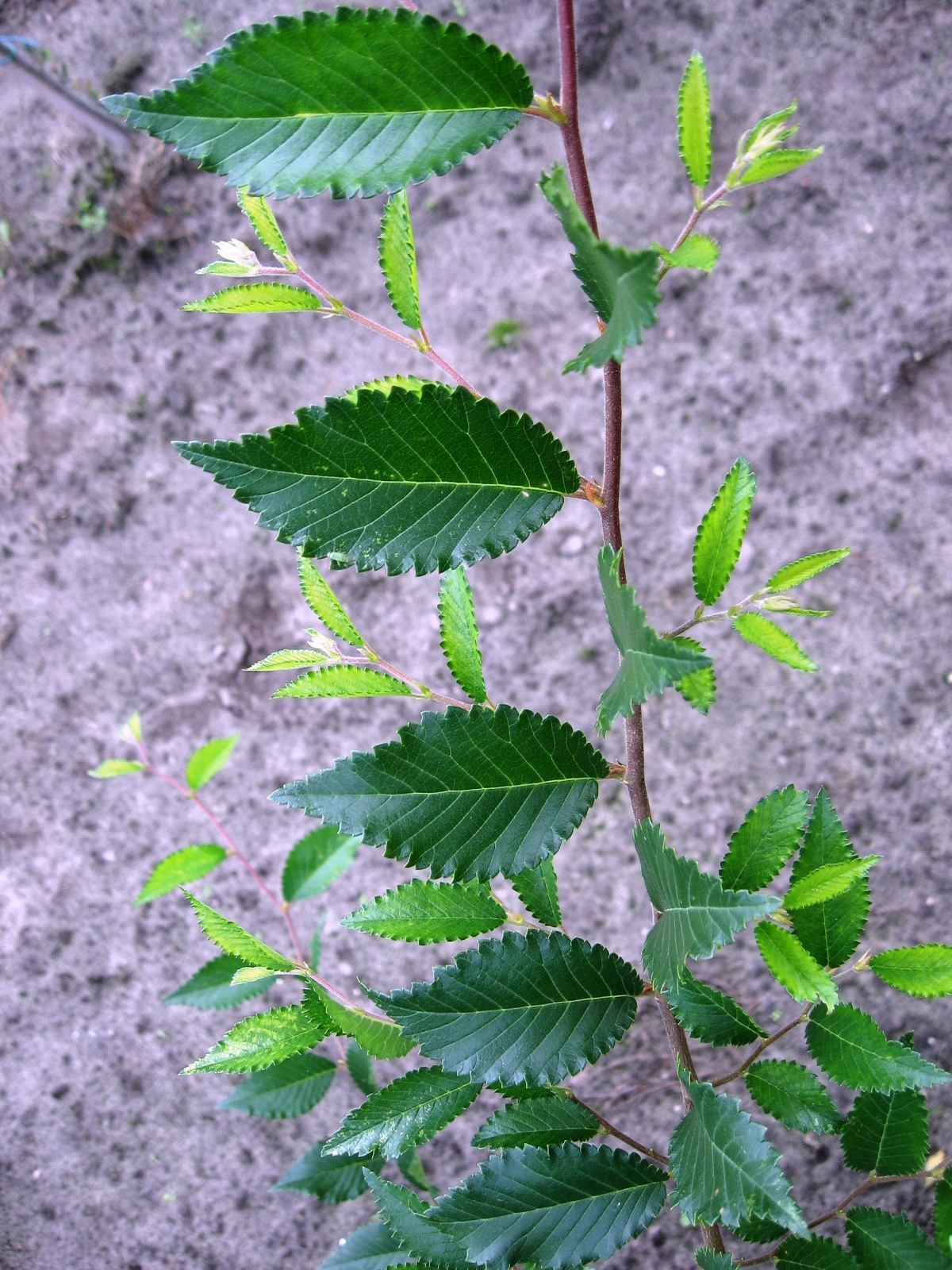
Foliage in summer

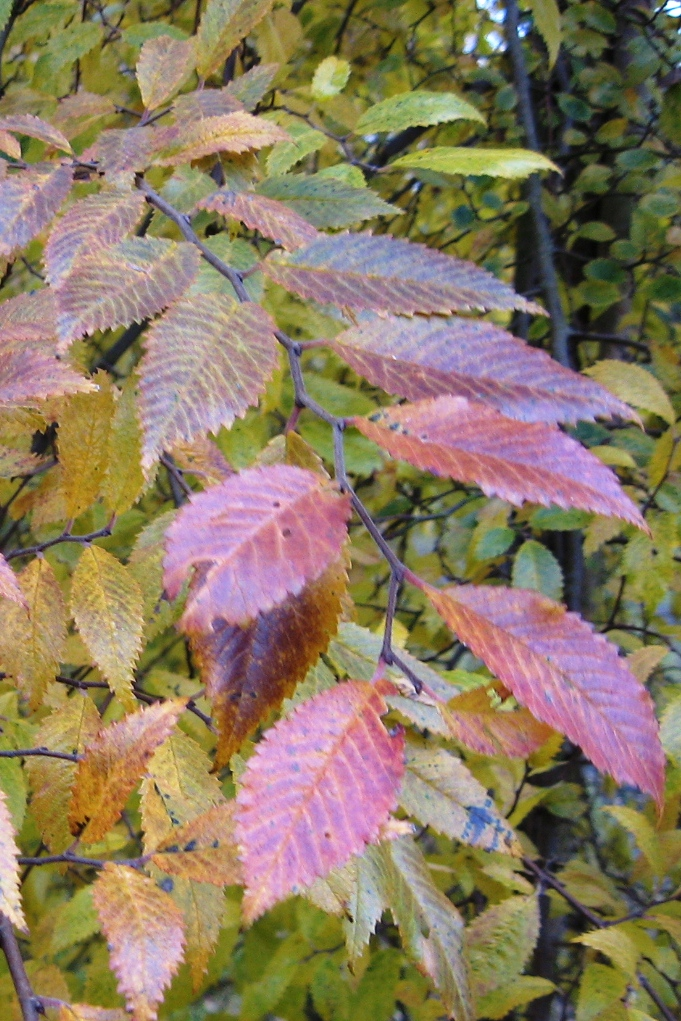
Foliage in autumn

== Pests and diseases ==
'Rebella' is very resistant to Dutch elm disease. Its name appears to derive from Latin rebellare, 'to offer resistance, to fight back'.

== Cultivation ==
'Rebella' was intended as a garden ornamental, though it has also been planted as a street tree in the Netherlands, as in Johannes Hilverdinkstraat, Amsterdam. Elsewhere, one stands in The Hornhof cemetery, Slotlaan, Nederhorst den Berg, planted in 2015. Ten were planted in Pieter de Hooghlaan, Hilversum, and three in Oud-Loosdrechtsedijk, Loosdrecht, in 2019, the latter part of Wijdemeren City Council's elm collection, assembled since 2003 by tree manager Martin Tijdgat and his colleagues. As a medium-size tree, 'Rebella' has been described by a Dutch nursery as "a nice alternative to, for example, crab apples or hawthorns. Because it does not get too big, 'Rebella' is suitable for narrower streets; nor will it easily cast shade on solar panels. Unfortunately, it is rather slow-growing when young, so cultivation takes time."

The tree is not known to be in commerce in North America or Australasia.

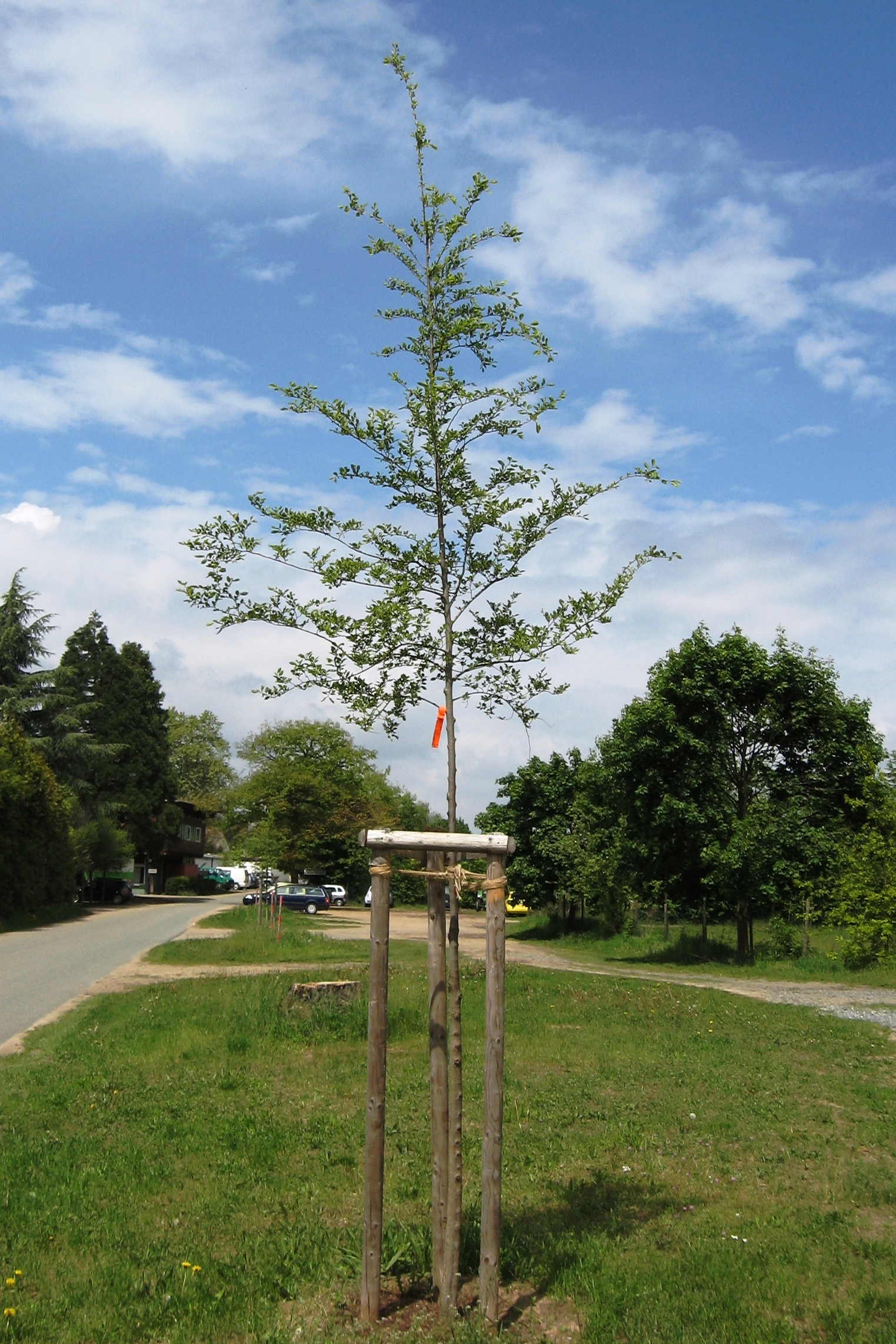
Young 'Rebella' in Germany (2011)

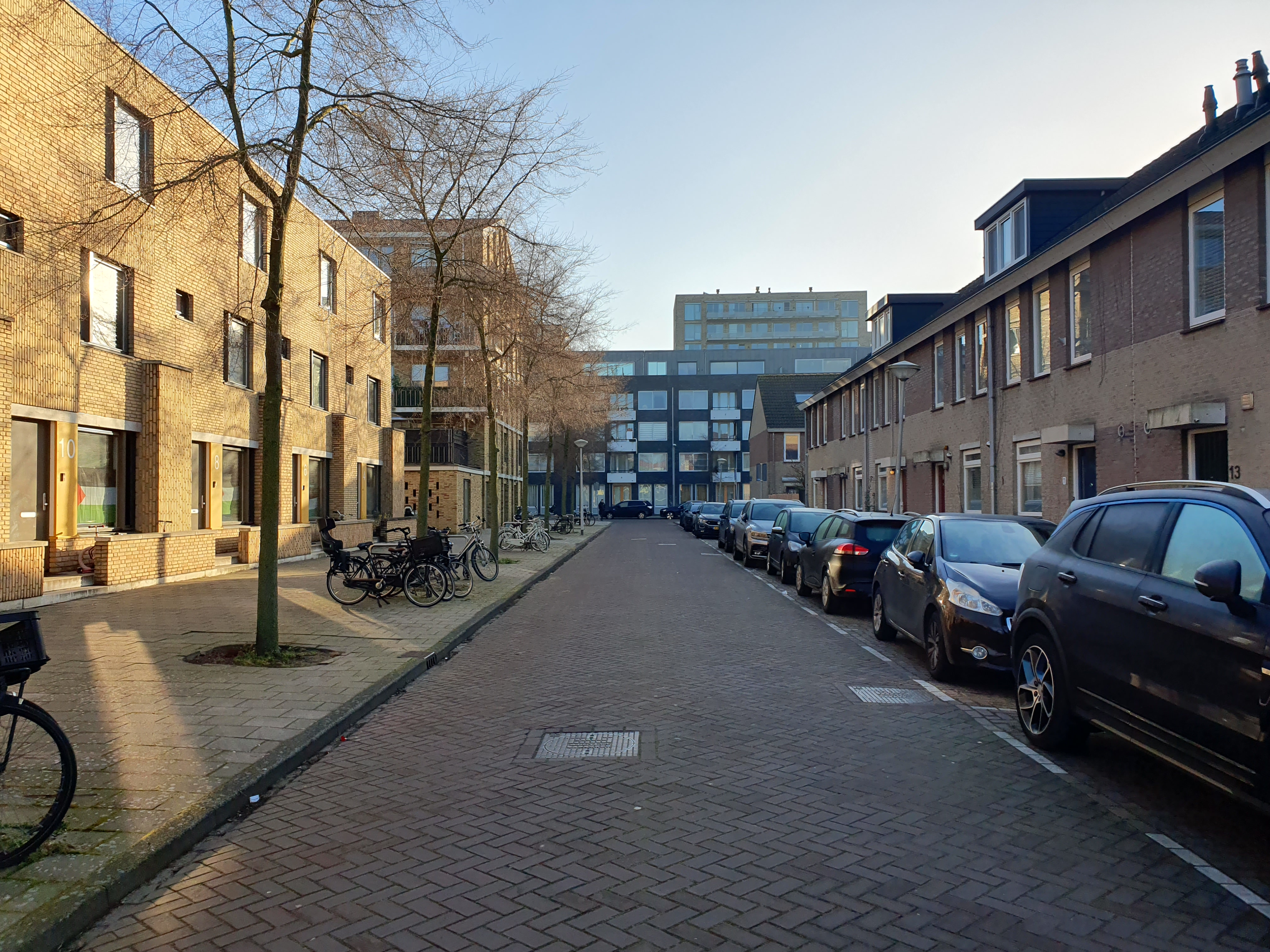
'Rebella', winter, Johannes Hilverdinkstraat, Amsterdam (2025)

== Accessions ==
=== Europe ===
- Grange Farm Arboretum , Sutton St James, Spalding, Lincs., UK. Acc. no. 1093.
- De Nieuwe Ooster Arboretum, Amsterdam; 1 tree, planted 2021.

== Nurseries ==
=== Europe ===
- Boomkwekerij Ebben , Land van Cuijk , Netherlands.
- Lorberg Quality Plants, Tremmen, Germany.
