= SMART Reading =

American nonprofit organization

- Founded: 1992
- Type: Educational charity
- Tax ID no.: 93-1051724
- Region served: Oregon
- Employees: 34
- Volunteers: about 5,000
- Website: www.smartreading.org

SMART Reading is a children's literacy non-profit, volunteer-driven tutoring program local to Oregon for at-risk K-3 readers. SMART was developed by Neil Goldschmidt and the law firm Ater Wynne Hewitt Dodson & Skerritt, LLP in 1992. It has grown from serving 585 children at 8 schools at its inception to serving 7,244 children at 204 sites in 2009, and 223 sites in 2011. As of December 2011, the organization's annual budget was $2.7 million.

The program concept involves each student getting one-on-one attention twice a week for 30 minutes as they read to a volunteer to help boost their confidence in their reading ability. Additionally, the students get to take two books home each month over the seven months the program runs each year (mid-October to mid-May), in order to make more reading material available at home.

The program's effectiveness is backed by a two-year study performed at the Eugene Research Institute which indicates SMART students outperform similar students in word identification and word comprehension by nearly a half standard deviation.

SMART aims to partner foremost with schools that have a high percentage of children from low-income families. School staff interviews, community support, and information from the Oregon Department of Education also influence school selection.

In 2010, SMART participated in Pepsi's Refresh Challenge and running for the $250,000 prize.

== See also ==
- Compensatory education
