= Heber =

Heber may be:

== Religious figures ==
- Heber (biblical figure), minor character in the Book of Genesis
- Heber the Kenite, mentioned in the Book of Judges 4:17 of the Hebrew Bible as Jael's husband
- Hud (prophet), also called Heber, an Islamic prophet

== People ==
- Heber (surname), a list of people
- Heber (given name), the origin of the given name and a list of people
- Héber (footballer), Brazilian footballer Héber Araujo dos Santos (born 1991)

== Places ==
- Heber, Arizona, United States, a census-designated place
- Heber, California, United States, a census-designated place
- Heber City, Utah, a city
- Heber (hills), a hill chain in Lower Saxony, Germany
