= Ulmus parvifolia var. coreana =

Scientific classification
- Kingdom: Plantae
- Clade: Tracheophytes
- Clade: Angiosperms
- Clade: Eudicots
- Clade: Rosids
- Order: Rosales
- Family: Ulmaceae
- Genus: Ulmus
- Species: U. parvifolia
- Variety: U. p. var. coreana

Trinomial name
- Ulmus parvifolia var. coreana Nakai

Variety of flowering plant

Ulmus parvifolia var. coreana, the Korean elm, is a variety of the Chinese elm Ulmus parvifolia, native to Korea.

== Description ==
Not available.

== Pests and diseases ==
No information available.

== Cultivation ==
The tree is very rare in cultivation in the United States and Europe. There are no known cultivars of this taxon, nor is it known to be in commerce.

== Accessions ==
=== North America ===
- Arnold Arboretum, US. Acc. no. 402–86
- Morton Arboretum, US. Acc. no. 48–86
- United States National Arboretum. No details available.

=== Europe ===
- Grange Farm Arboretum, Lincolnshire, UK. Acc. no. 1087.
