= Ulmus parvifolia 'A. Ross Central Park' =

Elm cultivar

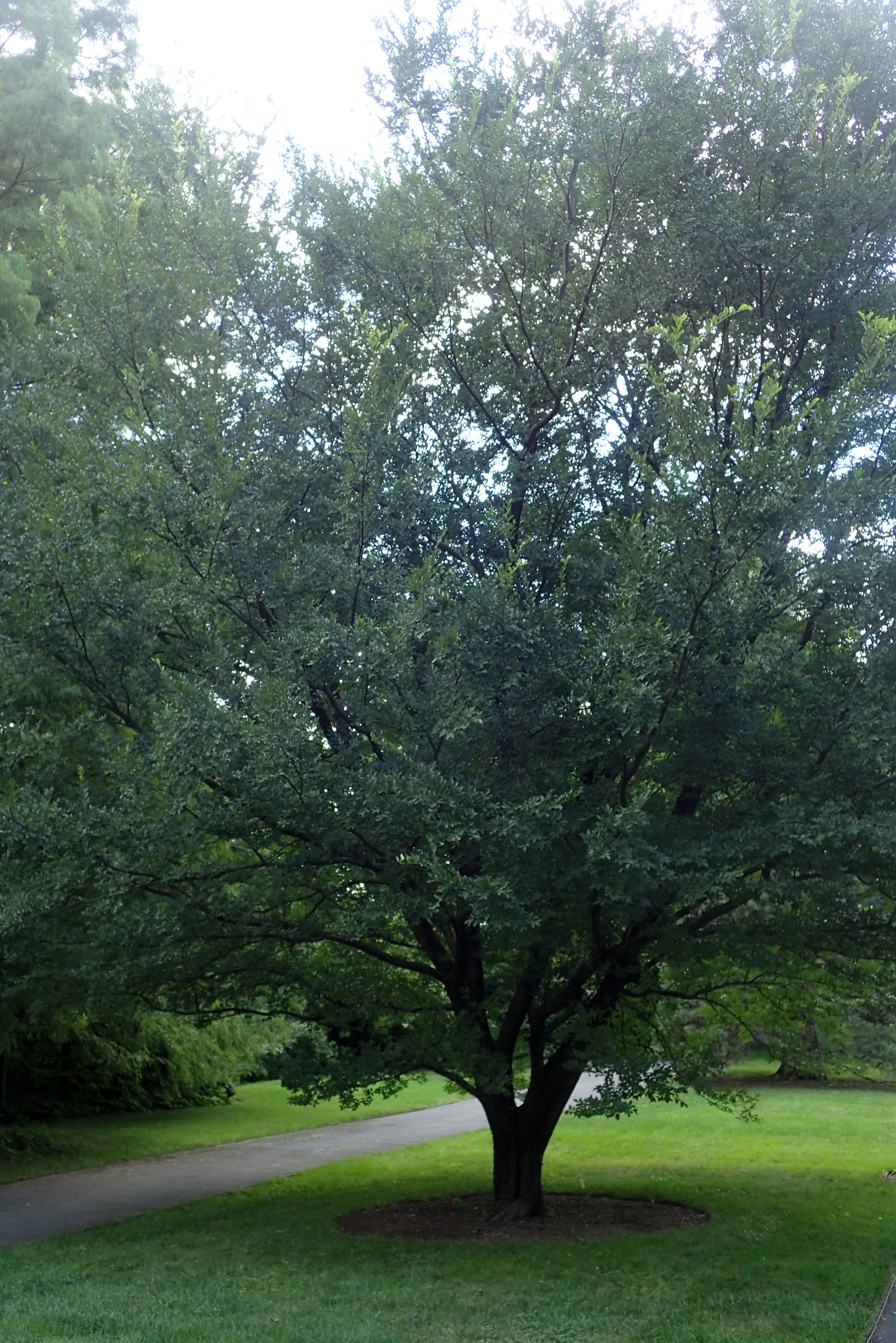
- Central Park Splendor in New York Botanical Garden (2016)
- Species: Ulmus parvifolia
- Cultivar: 'A. Ross Central Park' = Central Park Splendor
- Origin: New York, USA

Ulmus parvifolia 'A. Ross Central Park' (selling name Central Park Splendor) is a Chinese elm cultivar that is probably the hardiest in cultivation and was patented in 1989 by David F. Karnosky. The original tree, planted in 1865 by James Hogg, grew near the entrance to Central Park, at the junction of Fifth Avenue and 72nd Street on the Upper East Side of Manhattan in New York City, and died in the 1990s aged over 120 years. The cloning project was initiated in 1976 by the Arthur Ross Foundation, and executed by the School of Forestry and Wood Products, Michigan Technological University, Houghton.

Central Park Splendor was one of four Lacebark Elm cultivars discussed by Warren in 'The Return of the Elm' (2000), the others being Athena, Allee, and 'Dynasty'.

== Description ==
Central Park Splendor is a medium-size tree rarely exceeding 13 m (43 ft) in height, with a broad, rounded crown. The leaves are glossy green, turning yellow in autumn. The mottled bark, its colour ranging from greyish orange to greyish brown, is considered comparatively dull by some.

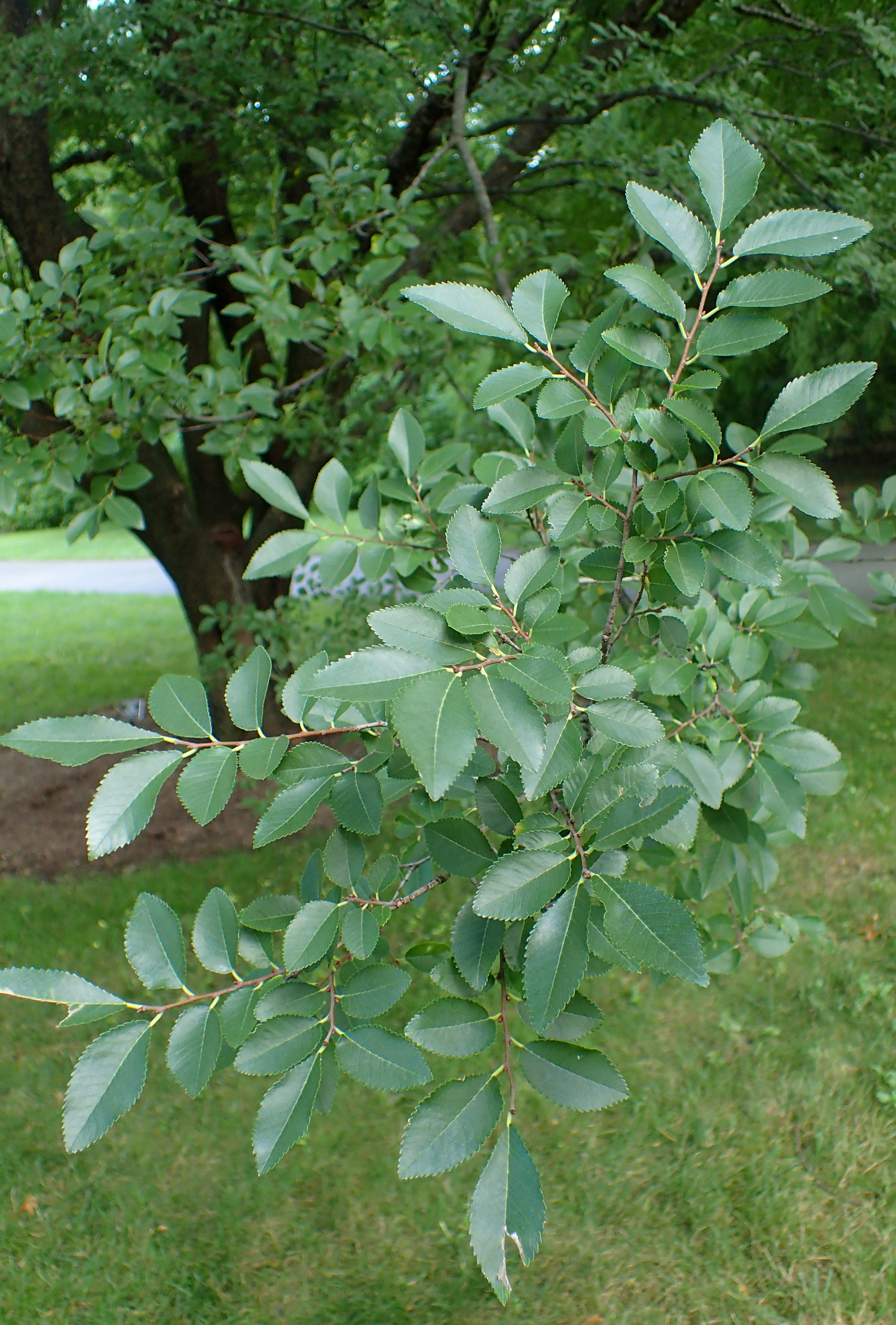
Leaves of Central Park Splendor

== Pests and diseases ==
The species and its cultivars are highly resistant, but not immune, to Dutch elm disease, and completely unaffected by the elm leaf beetle Xanthogaleruca luteola.

== Cultivation ==
Karnosky reported in 1988 that 1000 saplings were being grown by the New York City Parks Departments for planting in the city parks, with a smaller number being distributed to nurseries in New Jersey and Michigan. Central Park Splendor is not known to be in cultivation beyond North America.

== Synonymy ==
- 'Across Central Park': Dirr, M. A. & Richards, A. E. (1989), Amer. Nurseryman, 169 (3), 1989, in error.
- 'Aross Central Park'

== Etymology ==
The cultivar name is for Arthur Vining Ross.

== Accessions ==
=== North America ===
- Chicago Botanic Garden, Glencoe, Illinois, US. No details available.
- New York Botanical Garden, US. Acc. nos. 301/92, 4732/95

== Nurseries ==
=== North America ===
- Sun Valley Garden Centre, Eden Prairie, Minnesota, US.
