= Heber (surname) =

Heber is a surname. Notable people with the surname include:

- Alberto Héber Usher (1918–1981), Uruguayan politician
- Luis Alberto Héber (born 1957), Uruguayan politician, son of Mario Héber Usher
- Mario Héber Usher (1921–1980), Uruguayan politician
- Reginald Heber (1783–1826), Anglican bishop, missionary to India, and hymn writer
- Richard Heber (1773–1833), British book collector, half-brother of Reginald Heber
- Rick Heber (born 1932), American psychologist
