= Heber Slatter =

English footballer

Personal information
- Full name: Heber Percy Slatter
- Date of birth: 1887
- Place of birth: Earley, England
- Date of death: 7 May 1918 (aged 30–31)
- Place of death: near Foncquevillers, France
- Height: 5 ft 5 in (1.65 m)
- Position: Left half

Senior career*
Years	Team	Apps	(Gls)
1909–1912	Reading	35	(0)
1910–1914	Oxford City	72	(7)
- * Club domestic league appearances and goals

Heber Percy Slatter (1887 – 7 May 1918) was an English amateur footballer who played in the Southern League for Reading as a left half. He also played in the Isthmian League for Oxford City.

== Personal life ==
Slatter was born in Earley and grew up in Reading. He attended Christ's Hospital, and later worked as a tax collector for Reading Council. He was married with two children. In November 1915, during the second year of the First World War, Slatter enlisted as a gunner in the Royal Garrison Artillery. After being posted to the Western Front in 1916, he was promoted to corporal. He was wounded by shellfire at Foncquevillers on 3 May 1918 and died of wounds four days later. Slatter was buried in Couin New British Cemetery.

== Honours ==
Reading

- Southern League Second Division: 1910–11
