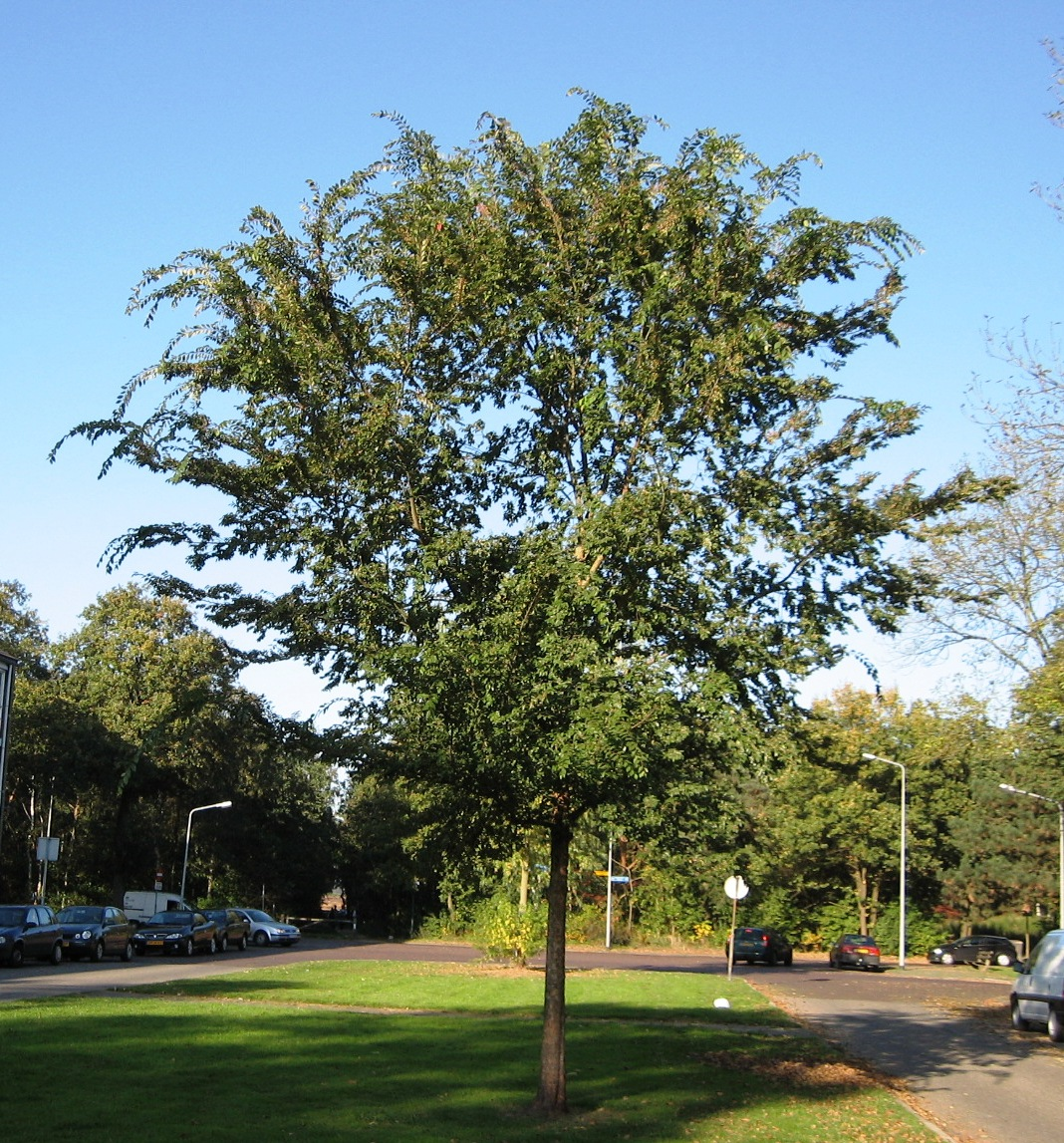
- Chinese elm, Hilversum

Conservation status
- Least Concern (IUCN 3.1)

Scientific classification
- Kingdom: Plantae
- Clade: Tracheophytes
- Clade: Angiosperms
- Clade: Eudicots
- Clade: Rosids
- Order: Rosales
- Family: Ulmaceae
- Genus: Ulmus
- Subgenus: U. subg. Ulmus
- Section: U. sect. Microptelea
- Species: U. parvifolia

Binomial name
- Ulmus parvifolia Jacq.

Synonyms
- Microptelea parvifolia Spach; Planera parvifolia Sweet; Ulmus campestris var. chinensis Loudon; Ulmus chinensis Persoon; Ulmus parvifolia Maxim., Franch. et Savatier, Forbes & Hemsl., Shirasawa; Ulmus sieboldii Daveau; Ulmus virgata Roxburgh

= Ulmus parvifolia =

Species of tree

Ulmus parvifolia, the Chinese elm or lacebark elm, is a species of flowering plant native to eastern Asia, including China, India, Japan, Korea, Vietnam, Siberia, and Kazakhstan. It has been described as "one of the most splendid elms, having the poise of a graceful Nothofagus".

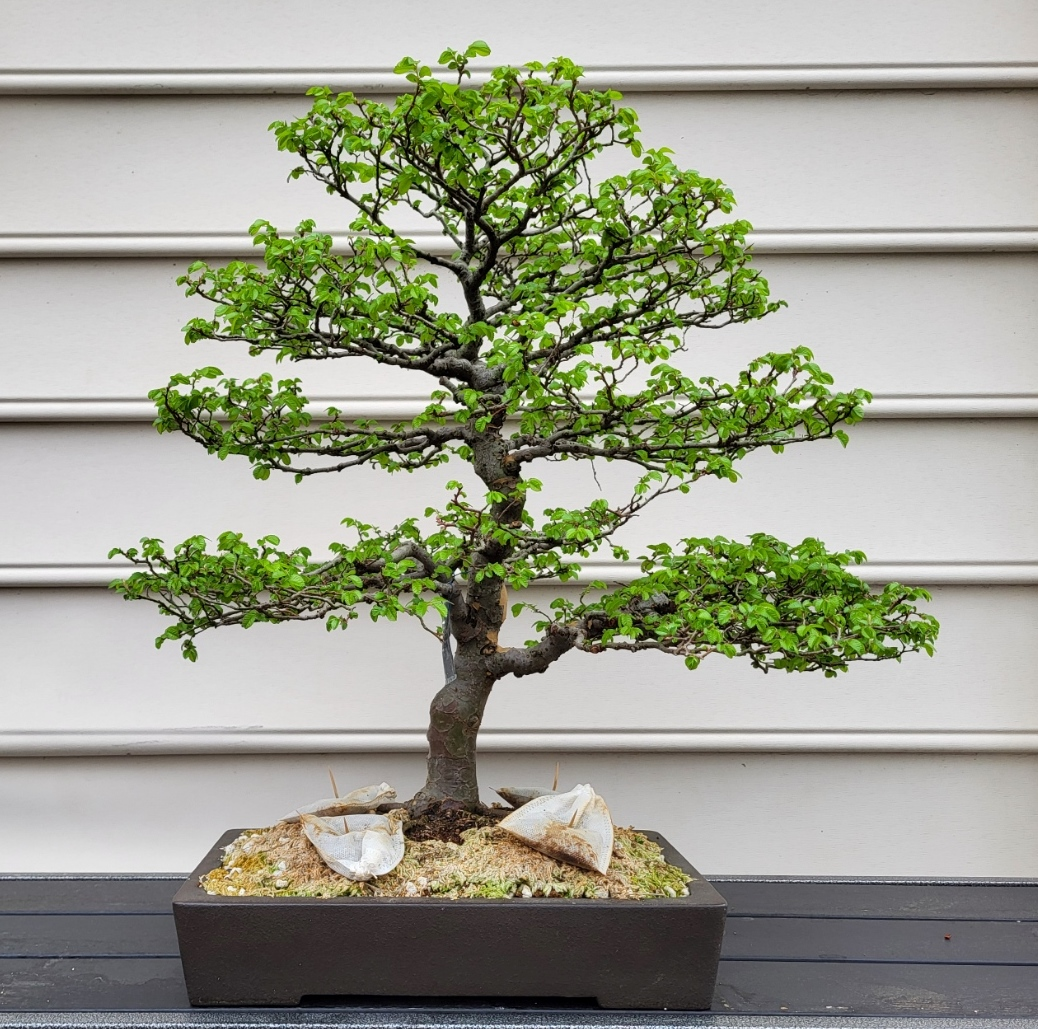
Chinese elm as bonsai during the spring growing season

== Description ==
A small to medium deciduous or semideciduous (rarely semievergreen) tree, it grows to 10–18 m (33–59 ft) tall and 15–20 m (49–66 ft) wide, with a slender trunk and crown. The leathery, lustrous green, single-toothed leaves are small, 2–5 cm long by 1–3 cm broad, and often are retained as late as December or even January in Europe and North America. In some years, the leaves take on a purplish-red autumn colour. The apetalous, wind-pollinated, perfect flowers are produced in early autumn, small and inconspicuous. The fruit is a samara, elliptical to ovate-elliptical, 10–13 mm long by 6–8 mm broad. The samara is mostly glabrous, the seed at the centre or toward the apex, and is borne on a stalk 1–3 mm in length; it matures rapidly and disperses by late autumn. The trunk has a handsome, flaking bark of mottled greys with tans and reds, giving rise to its other common name, the lacebark elm, although scarring from major branch loss can lead to large, canker-like wounds. Ploidy: 2n = 28.

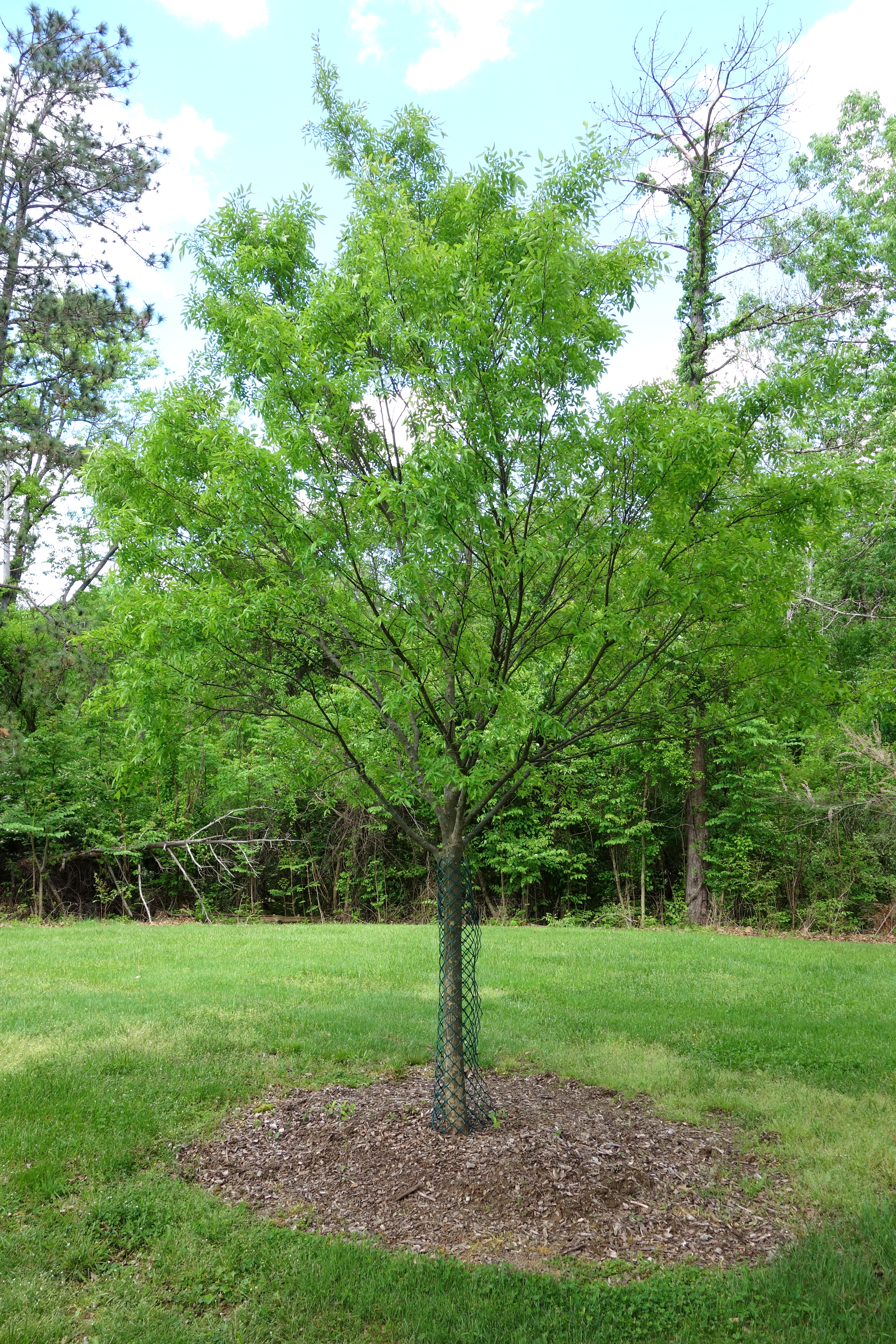
Young U. parvifolia in new leaf, May

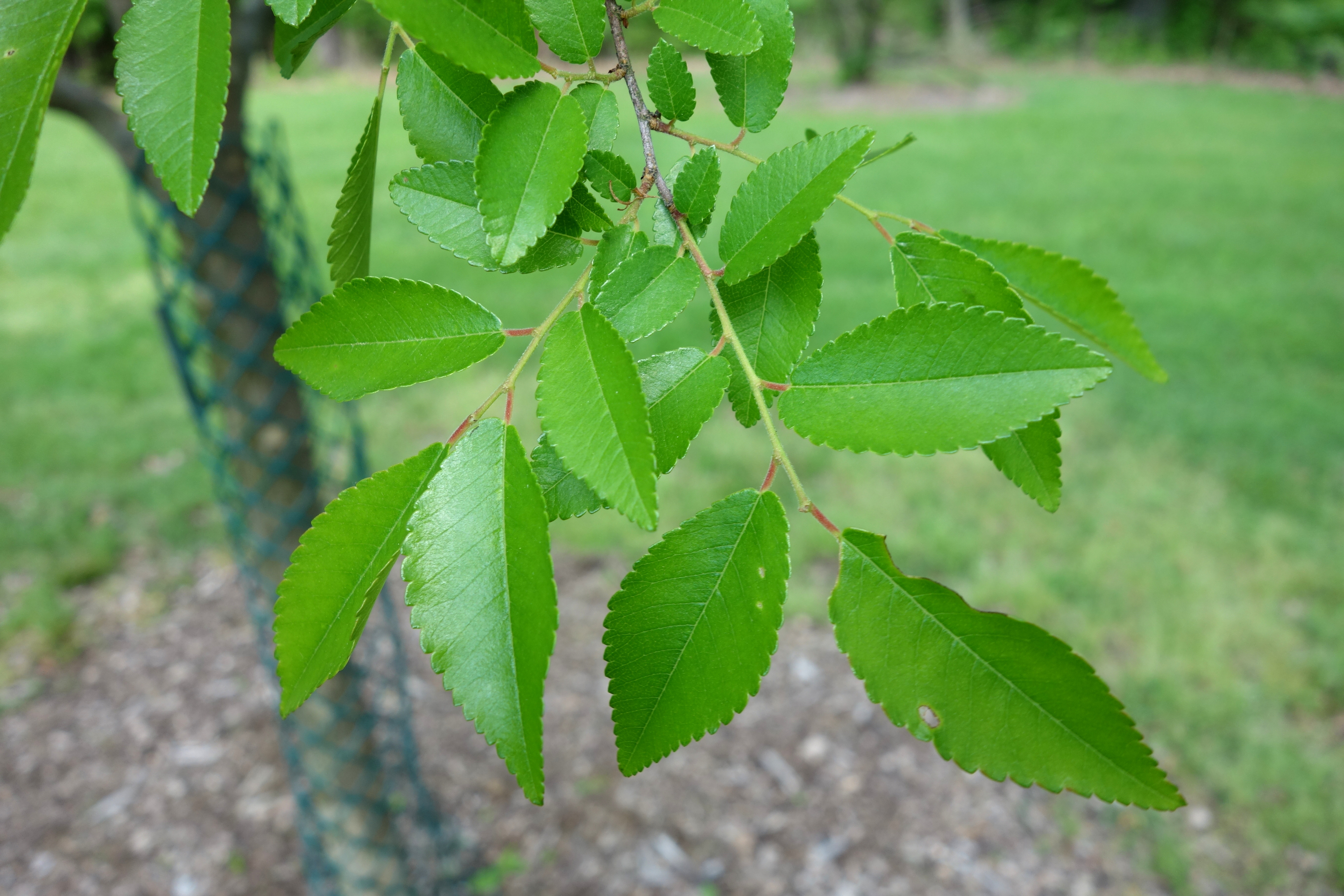
New leaves

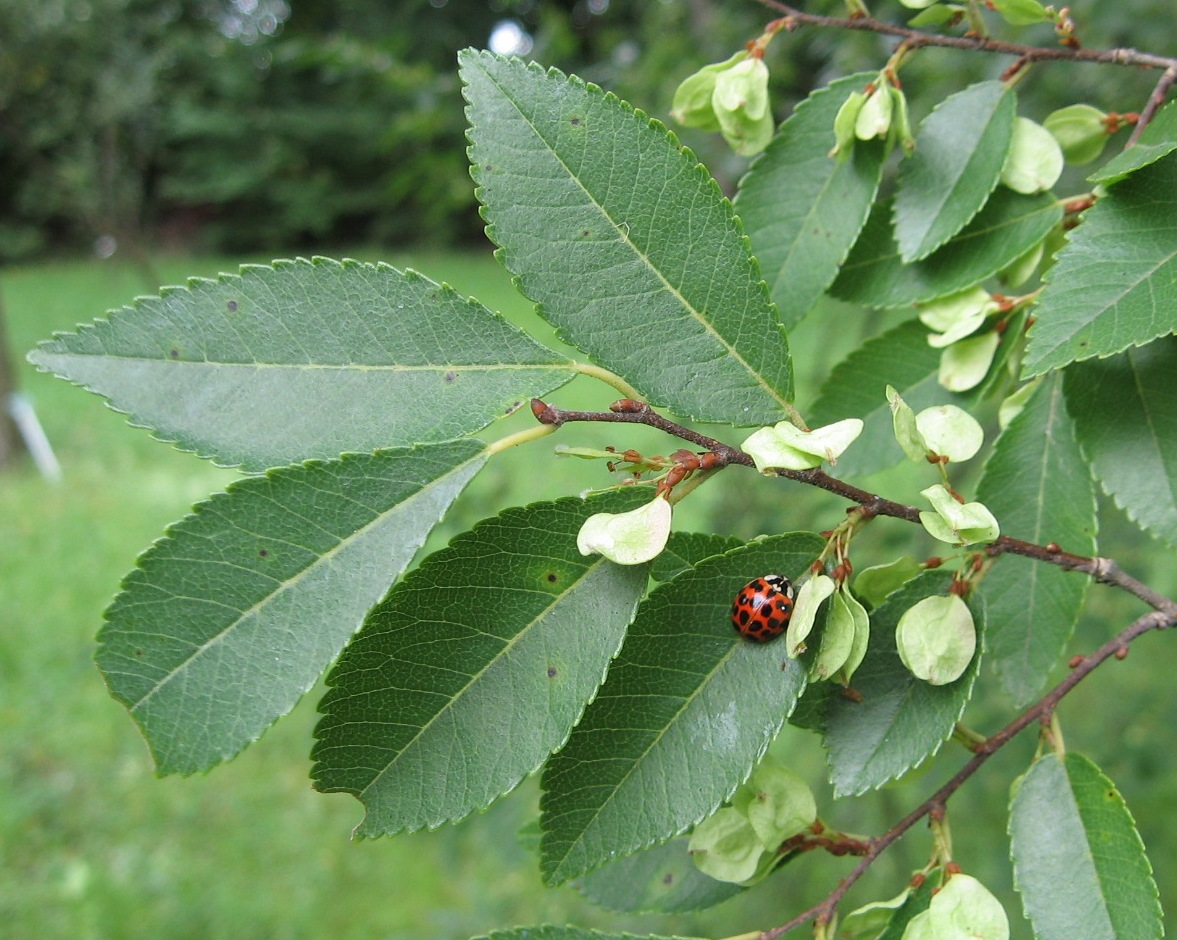
Foliage and immature fruit

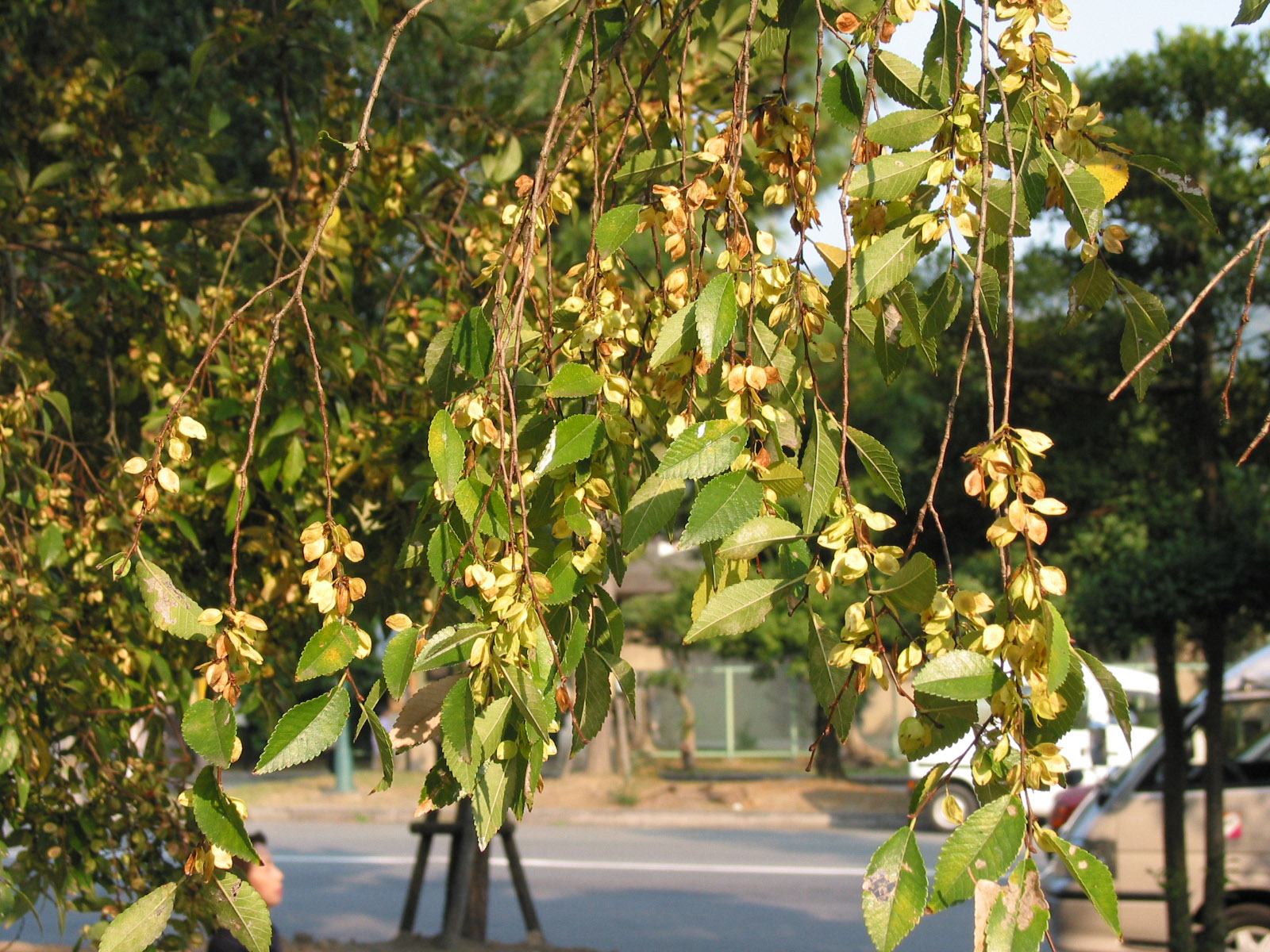
Foliage and mature fruit

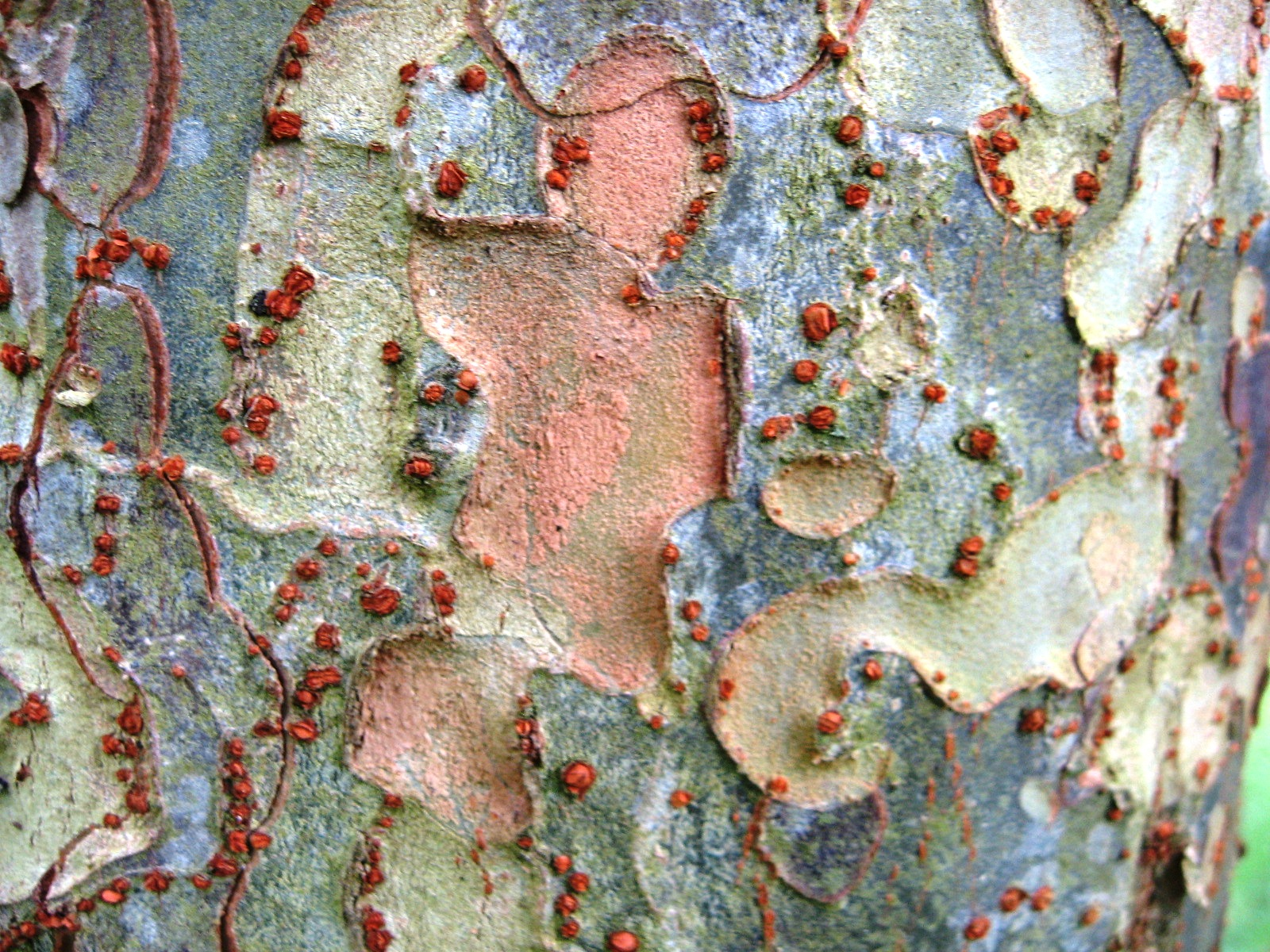
Bark

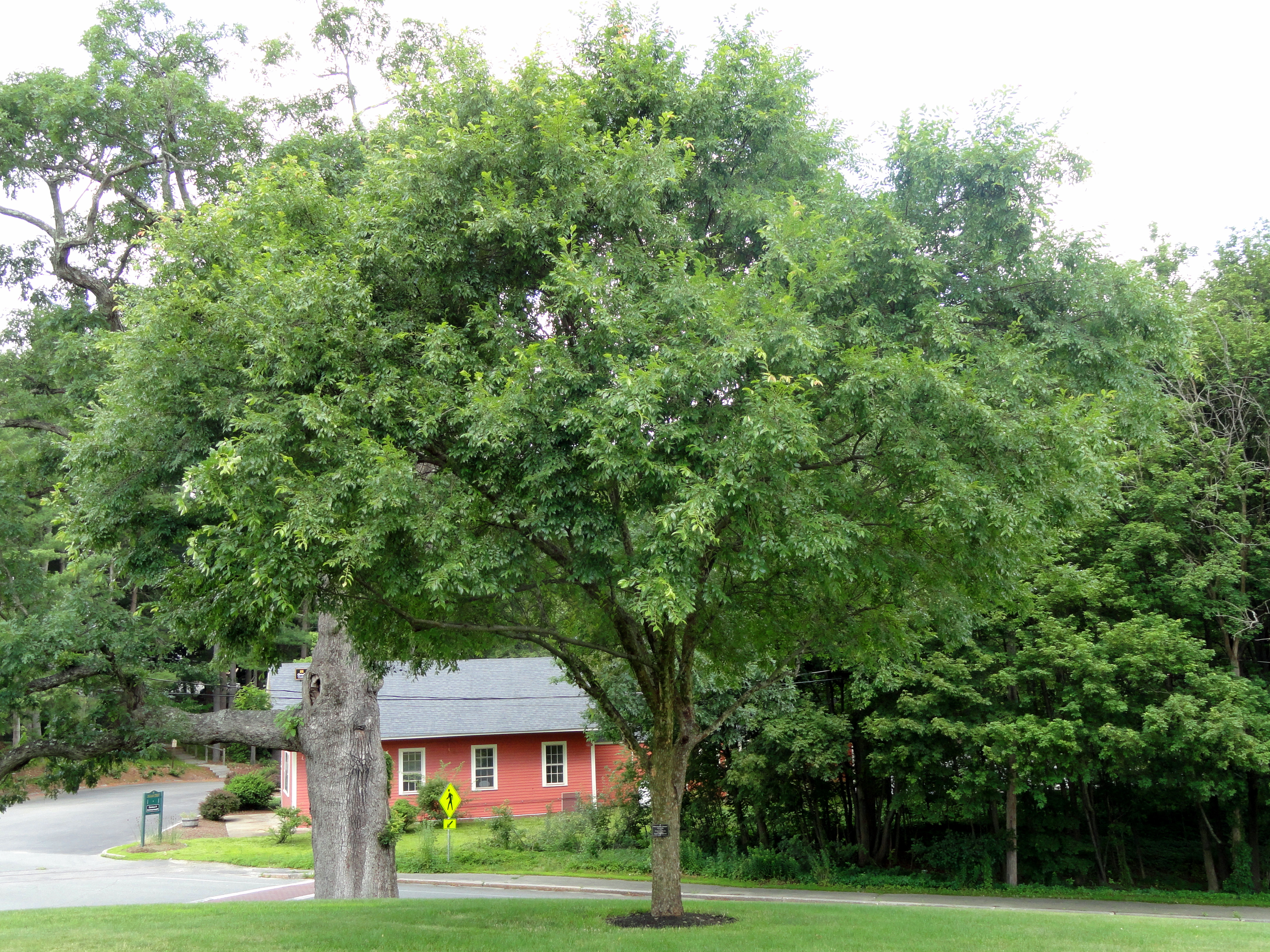
Habit of older tree

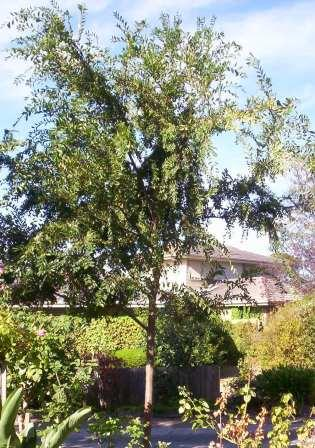
U. parvifolia juvenile

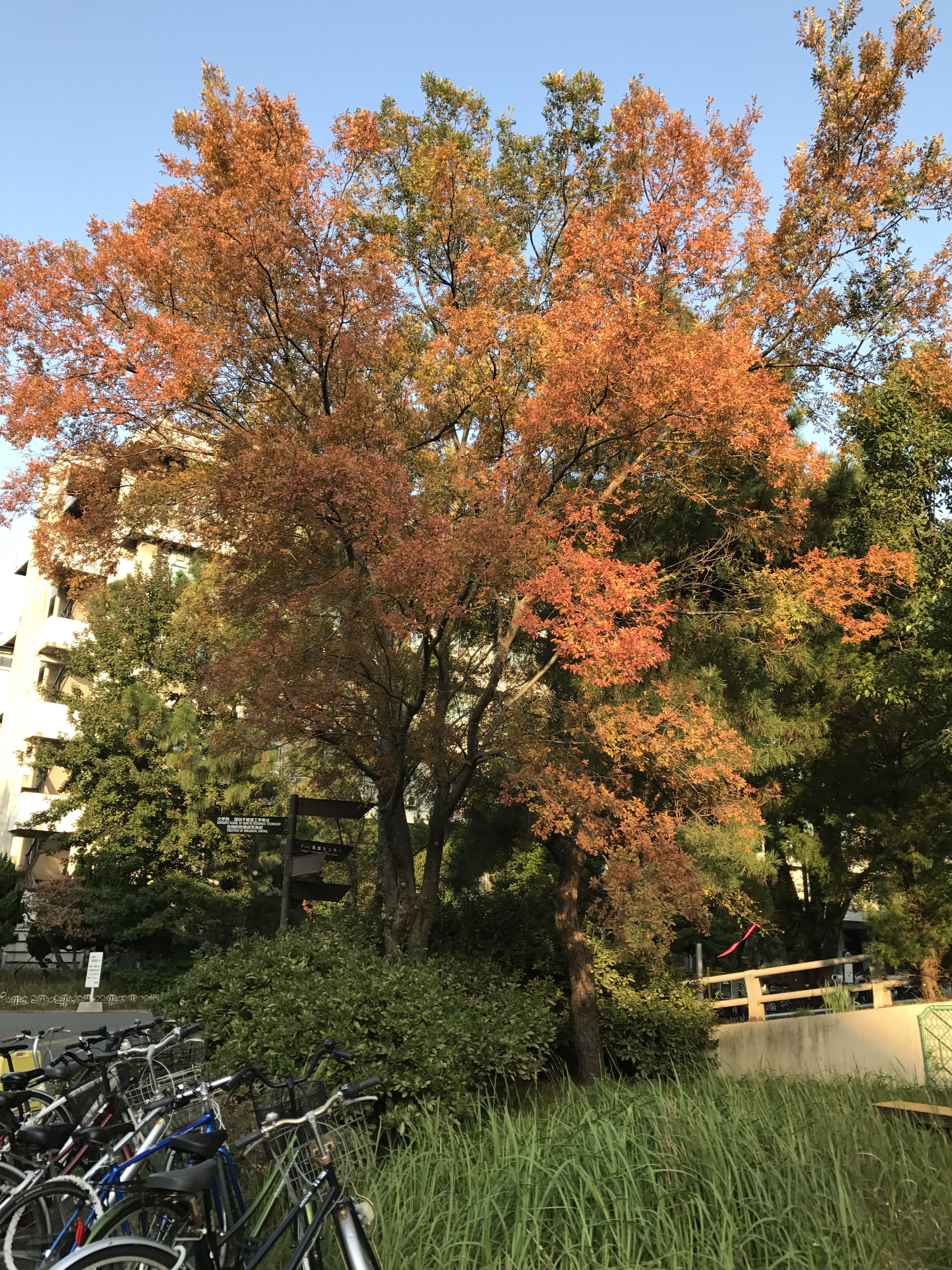
U. parvifolia autumn colouring, Japan

Many nurserymen and foresters mistakenly refer to Ulmus pumila, the rapidly growing, disease-ridden, relatively short-lived, weak-wooded Siberian elm, as "Chinese elm". This has given the true Chinese elm an undeserved bad reputation. The two elms are distinct species. The Siberian elm's bark becomes deeply ridged and furrowed with age, among other obvious differences. It possesses a very rough, greyish-black appearance, while the Chinese elm's smooth bark becomes flaky and blotchy, exposing distinctive, light-coloured mottling, hence the synonym lacebark elm for the real Chinese elm. Siberian elm produces seed in spring, Chinese elm in autumn.

== Wood and timber ==
Elms, hickory, and ash all have remarkably hard, tough wood, making them popular for tool handles, bows, and baseball bats. Chinese elm is considered the hardest of the elms. It is said to be the best of all woods for chisel handles and similar uses due to its superior hardness, toughness, and resistance to splitting. Chinese elm lumber is used most for furniture, cabinets, veneer, hardwood flooring, and specialty uses such as longbow construction and tool handles. Most commercially milled lumber goes directly to manufacturers rather than to retail lumber outlets.

Chinese elm heartwood ranges in tone from reddish-brown to light tan, while the sapwood approaches off-white. The grain is often handsome and dramatic. Unlike other elms, the freshly cut Chinese elm has a peppery or spicy odour. While it turns easily and will take a nice polish off the lathe without any finish, and it holds detail well, the fibrous wood is usually considered too tough for carving or hand tools. Chinese elm contains silica, which is hard on planer knives and chainsaws, but it sands fairly easily. Like other woods with interlocking grain, planes should be kept extra sharp to prevent tearing at the grain margins. It steam-bends easily and holds screws well, but pilot holes and countersinking are needed. It tends to be a "lively" wood, tending to warp and distort while drying. This water-resistant wood easily takes most finishes and stains.

== Taxonomy ==
Subspecies, varieties, and forms:

- Ulmus parvifolia var. coreana Nakai
- 'Ulmus parvifolia f. lanceolata' Ueki

== Pests and diseases ==
The Chinese elm is highly resistant, but not immune, to Dutch elm disease. It is also very resistant to the elm leaf beetle Xanthogaleruca luteola, but has a moderate susceptibility to elm yellows. In trials at the Sunshine Nursery, Oklahoma, the species was adjudged as having the best pest resistance of about 200 taxa. However, foliage was regarded as only "somewhat resistant" to black spot by the Plant Diagnostic Clinic of the University of Missouri.

Cottony cushion scale or mealy bugs, often protected and "herded" by ants, exude sticky, sweet honeydew, which can mildew leaves and be a minor annoyance by dripping on cars and furniture. However, severe infestations on or obvious damage to otherwise healthy trees are uncommon.

In some regions of the Southern United States, a fungus known as Texas root rot (Phymatotrichopsis omnivora) is known to cause sudden death of lacebark elms when infected. Alan Mitchell reported (1984) that established trees at Kew Gardens and at Royal Victoria Park, Bath, had been killed by honey fungus.

== Cultivation ==
The Chinese elm is a tough landscape tree, hardy enough for use in harsh planting situations such as parking lots, small planters along streets, and plazas or patios. The tree is arguably the most ubiquitous elm, now found on all continents except Antarctica. It was introduced to Europe at the end of the 18th century as an ornamental, and is found in many botanical gardens and arboreta. The tree was introduced to the UK in 1794 by James Main, who collected in China for Gilbert Slater of Low Layton, Essex. It was also introduced to the United States in 1794, where, before the introduction of cold-hardy forms from the 1990s, it was mainly planted in southern States and in California. It has proved very popular in recent years as a replacement for American elms killed by Dutch elm disease. The tree was distributed in Victoria, Australia, from 1857. At the beginning of the 20th century, Searl's Garden Emporium, in Sydney, marketed it. Three U. parvifolia were supplied in 1902 by Späth to the Royal Botanic Garden Edinburgh. In New Zealand, it was found to be particularly suitable for windswept locations along the coast. The tree is commonly planted as an ornamental in Japan, notably around Osaka Castle.

U. parvifolia is one of the cold-hardiest of the Chinese species. In artificial freezing tests at the Morton Arboretum. the LT50 (temperature at which 50% of tissues die) was found to be −34 °C (−29 °F).

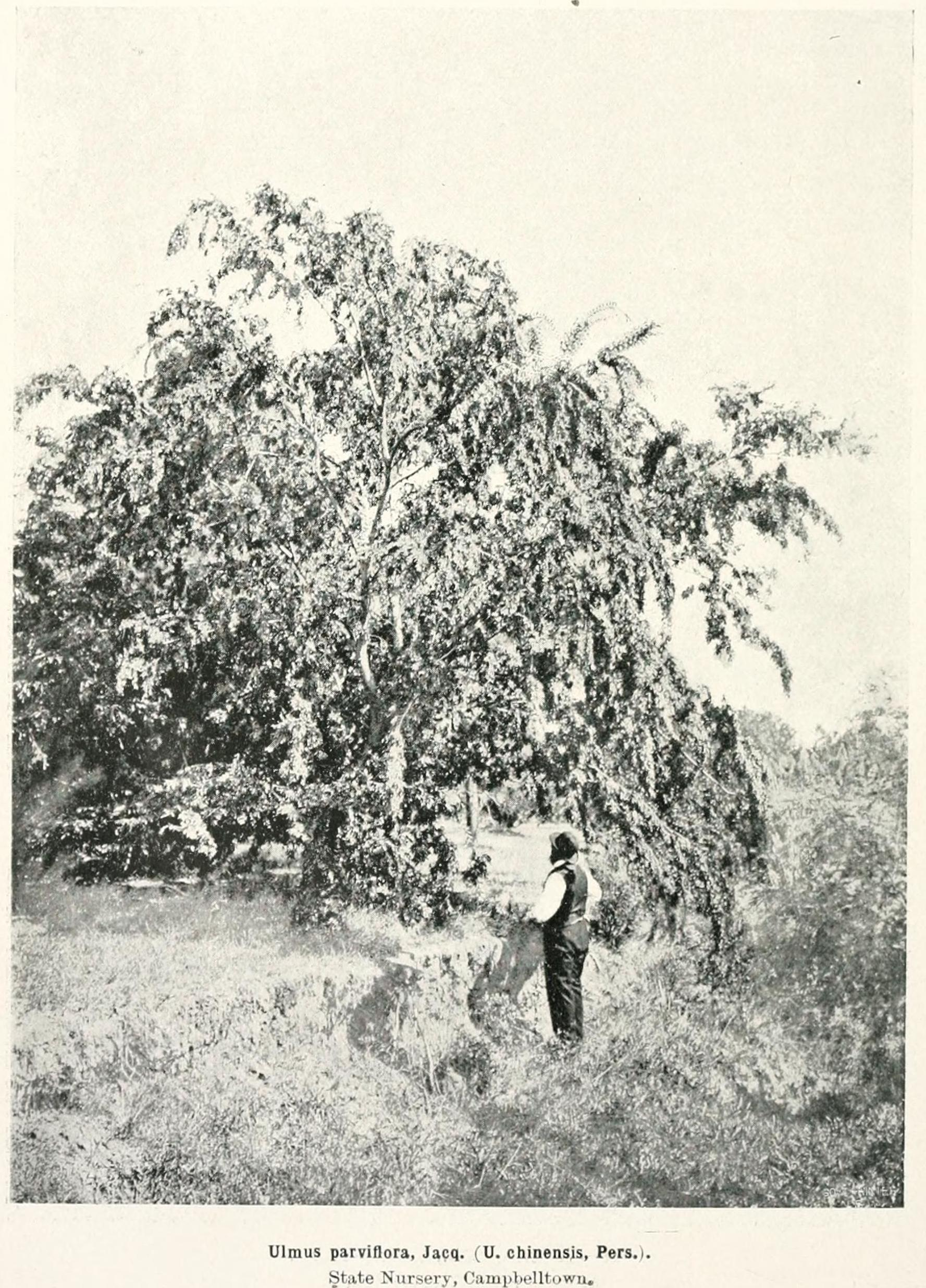
Ulmus parvifolia, State Nursery, Campbelltown, New South Wales (c. 1908)

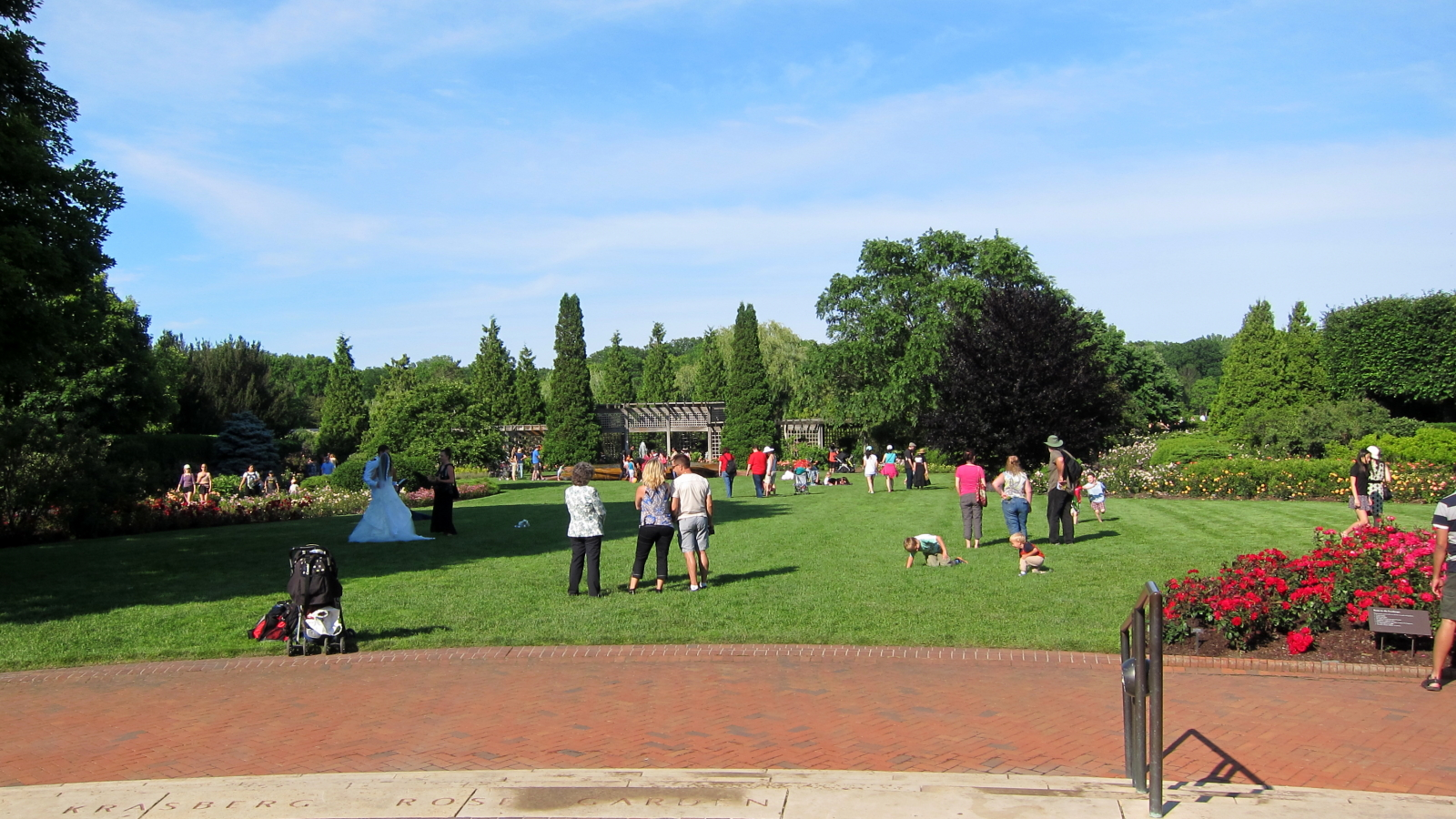
Ulmus parvifolia (centre right), Chicago Botanic Garden (2015)

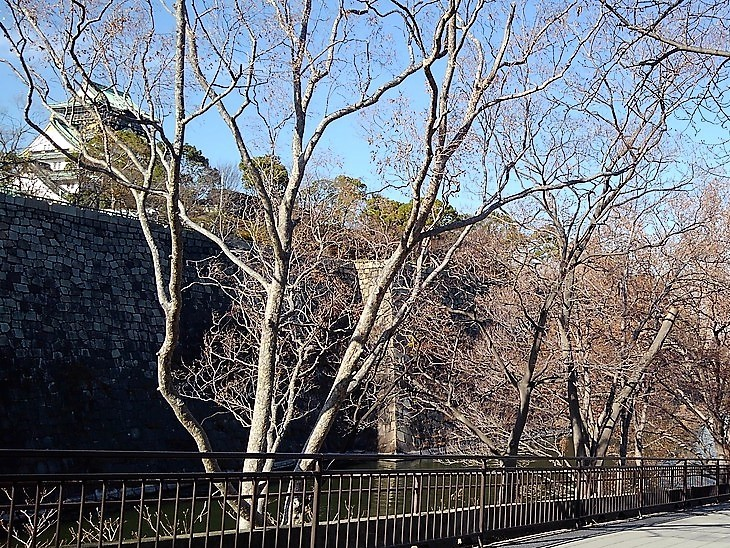
Chinese elm planted around Osaka Castle, Japan (2019)

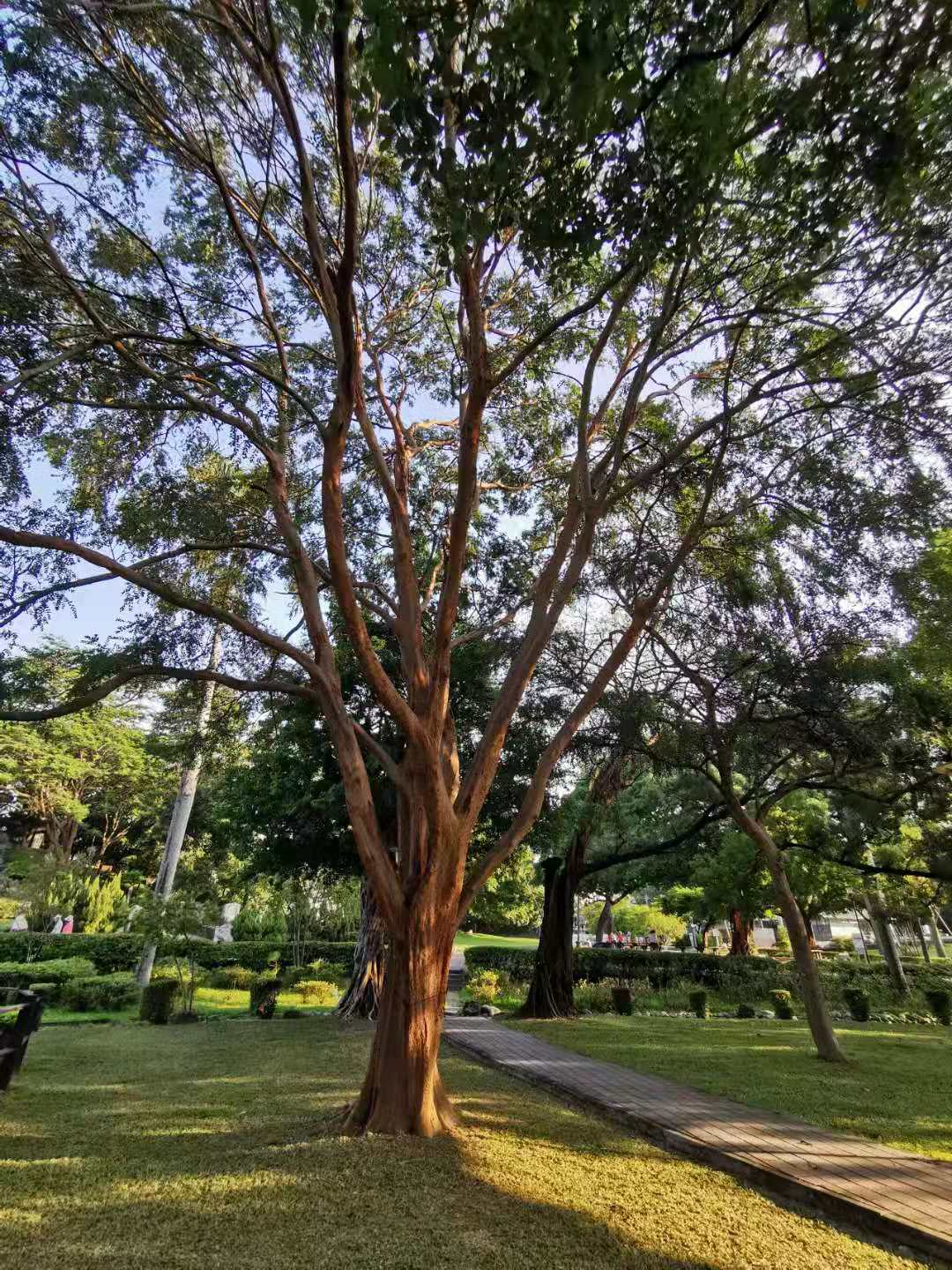
U. parvifolia, Taiwan (2021)

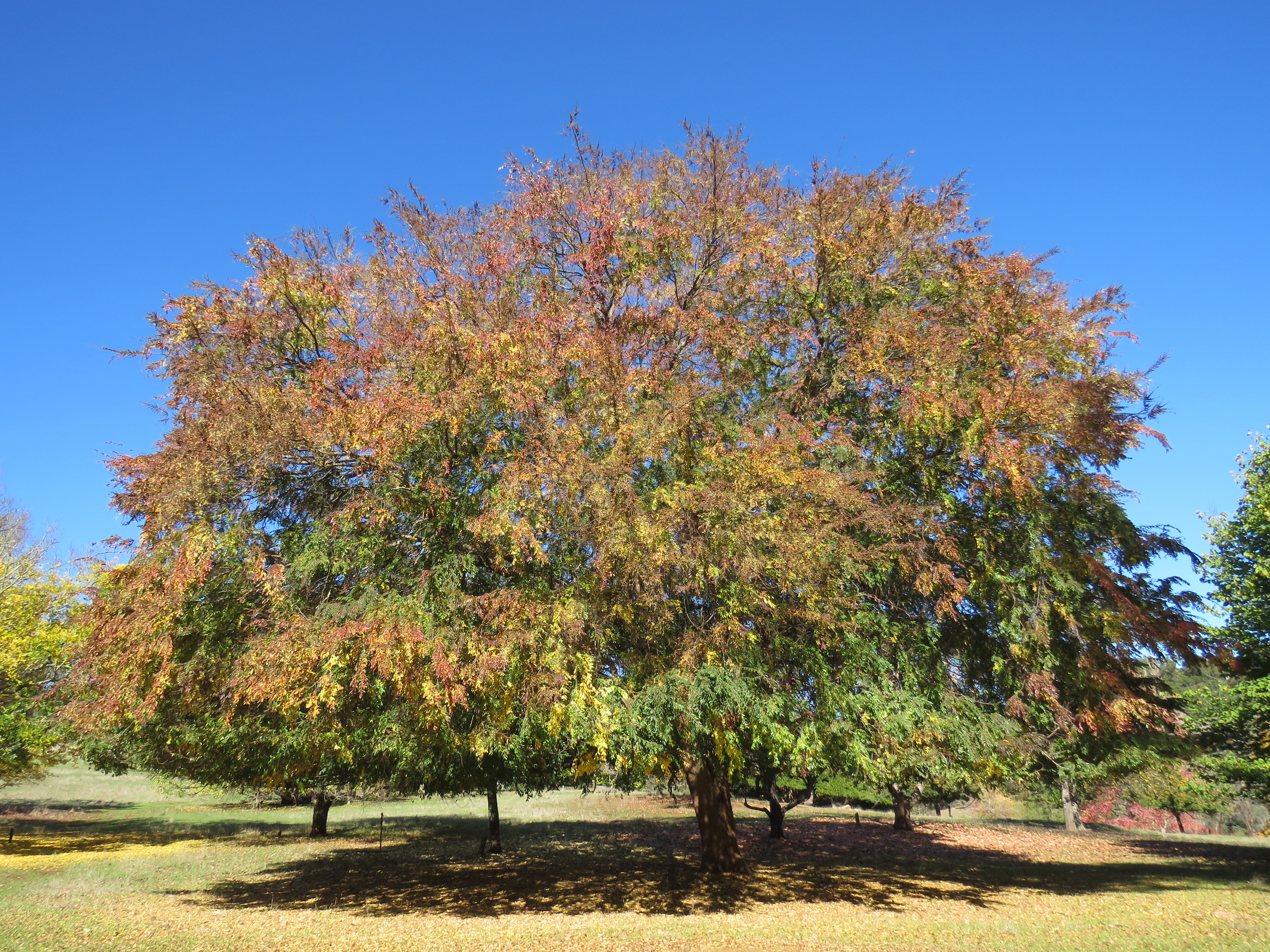
Ulmus parvifolia, Golden Valley Tree Park, Western Australia, planted in 1982 (May 2022)

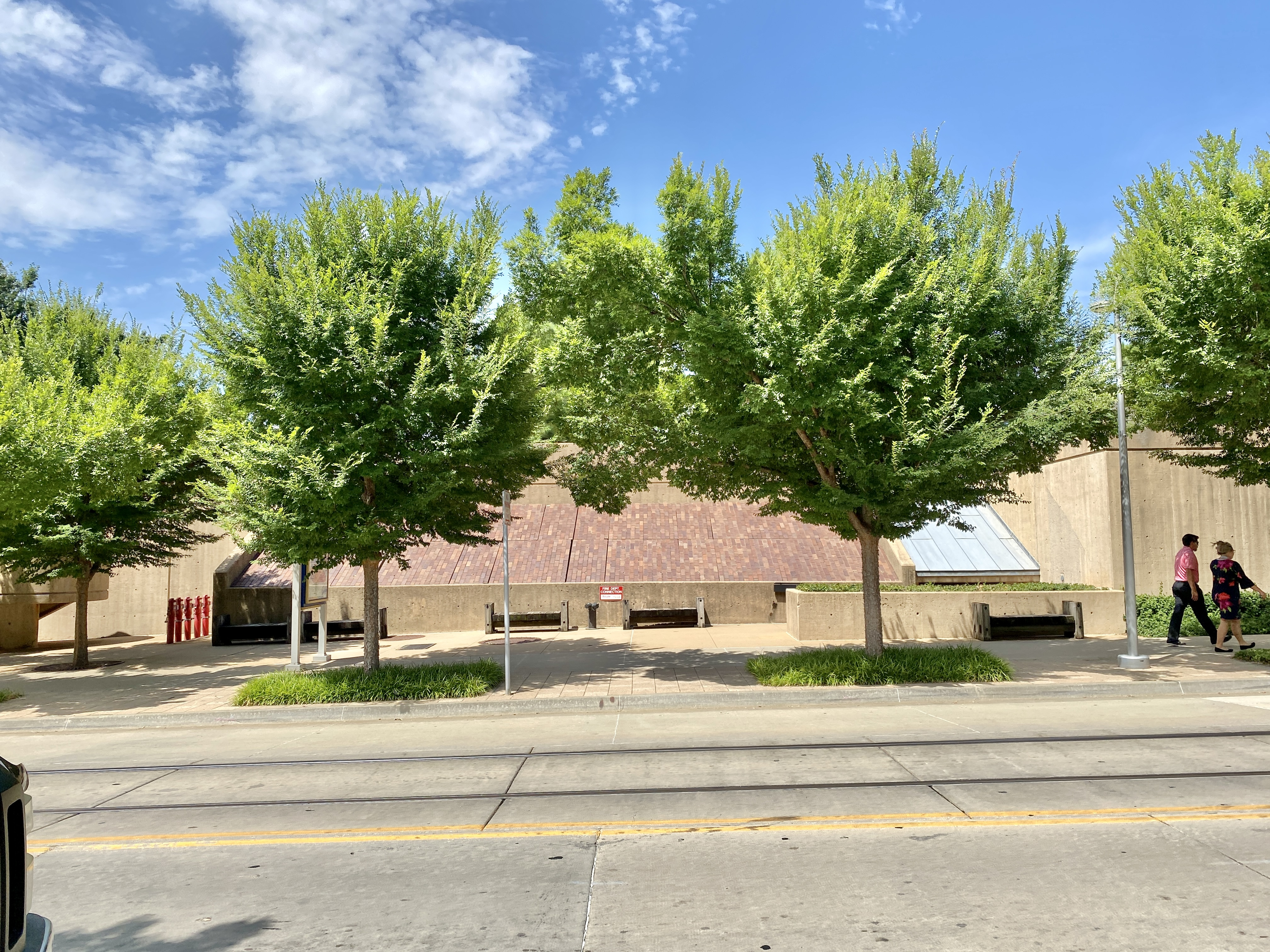
Lacebark elms, Oklahoma City National Memorial (2024)

=== Bonsai ===
Owing to its versatility and ability to tolerate a wide range of temperatures, light, and humidity conditions, the Chinese elm is a popular choice as a bonsai species. It is perhaps the single most widely available. It is considered a good choice for beginners because of its high tolerance of pruning.

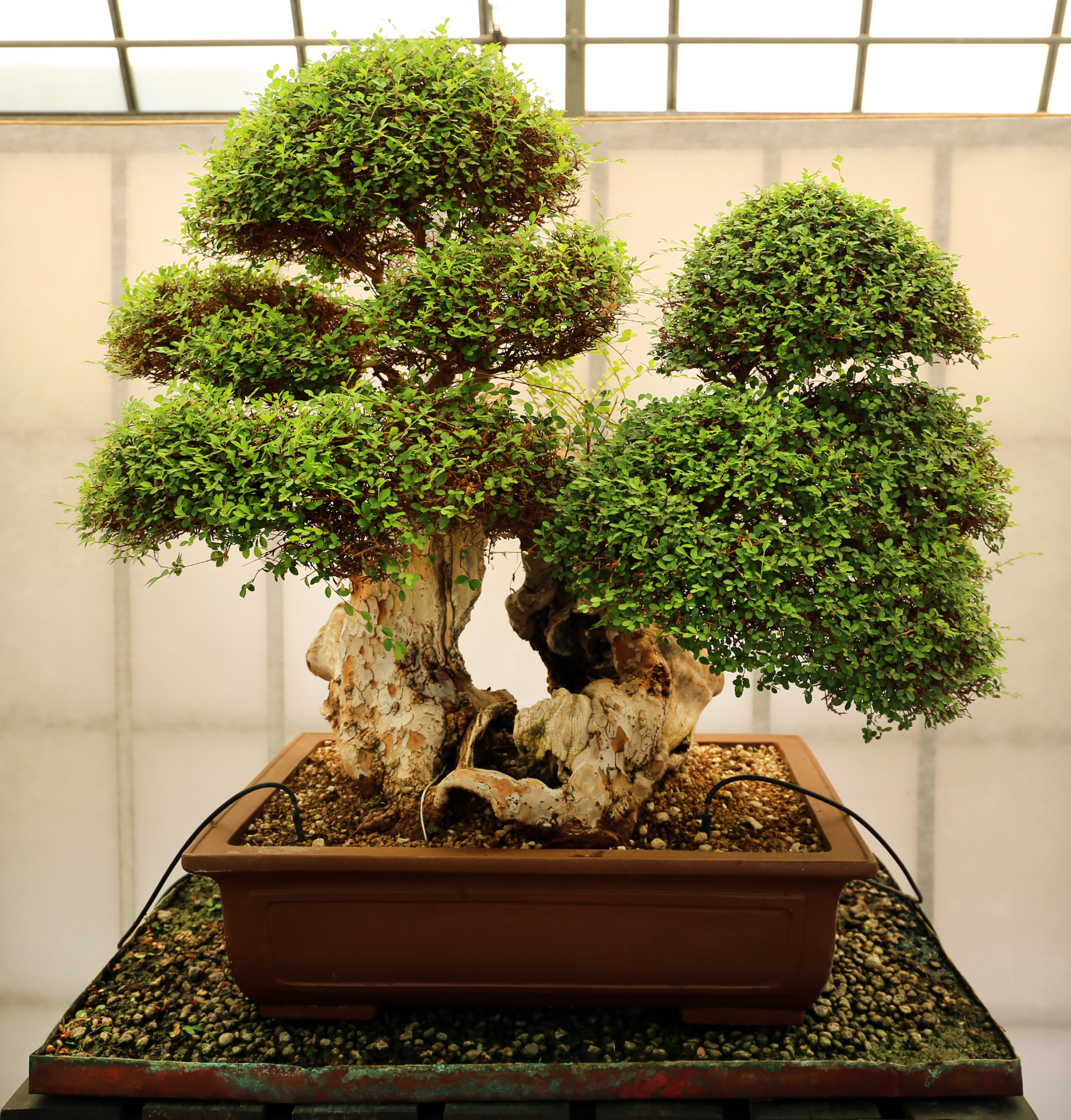
U. parvifolia bonsai, multitrunk style, about 100 years old

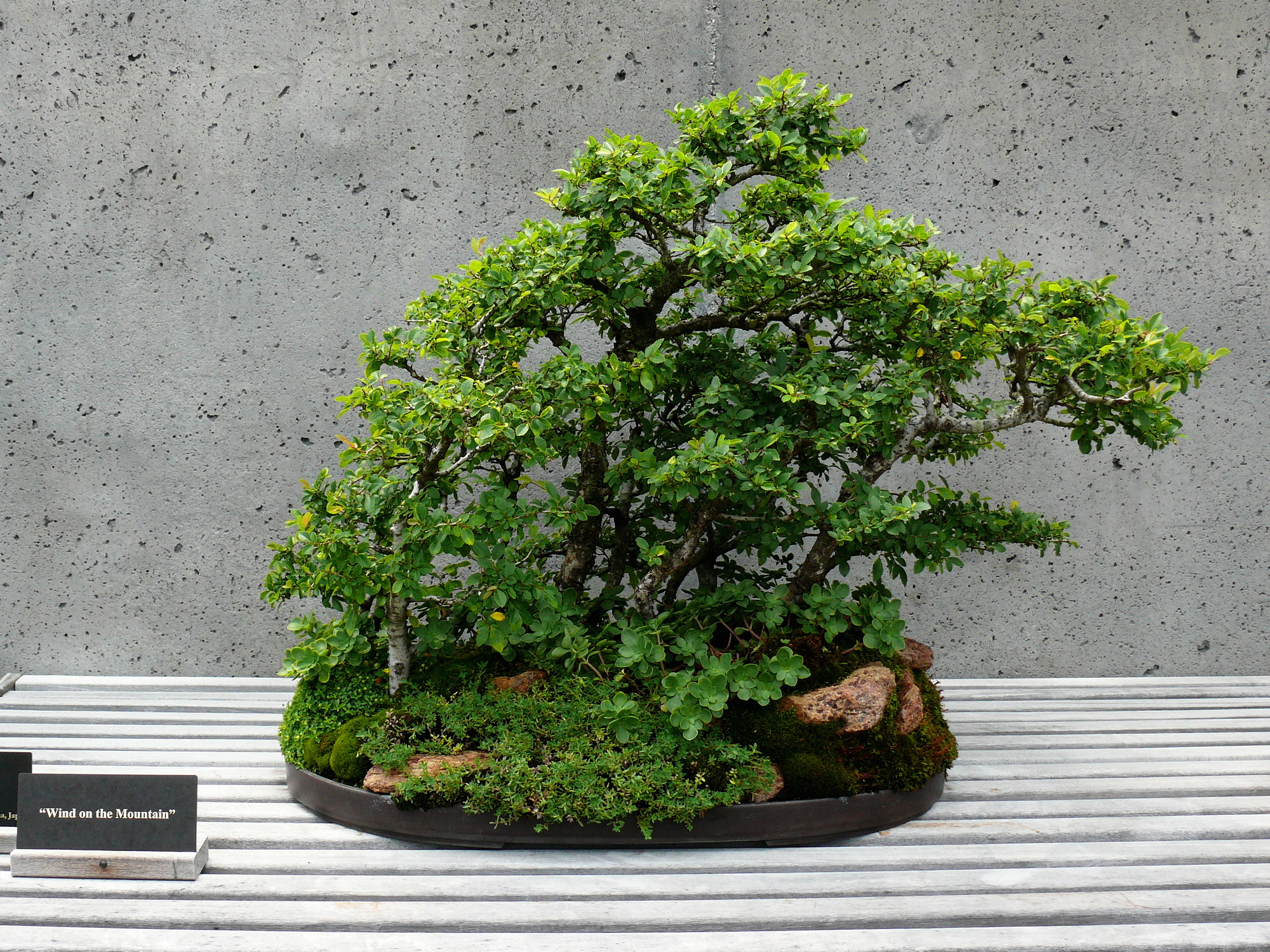
Chinese elm bonsai

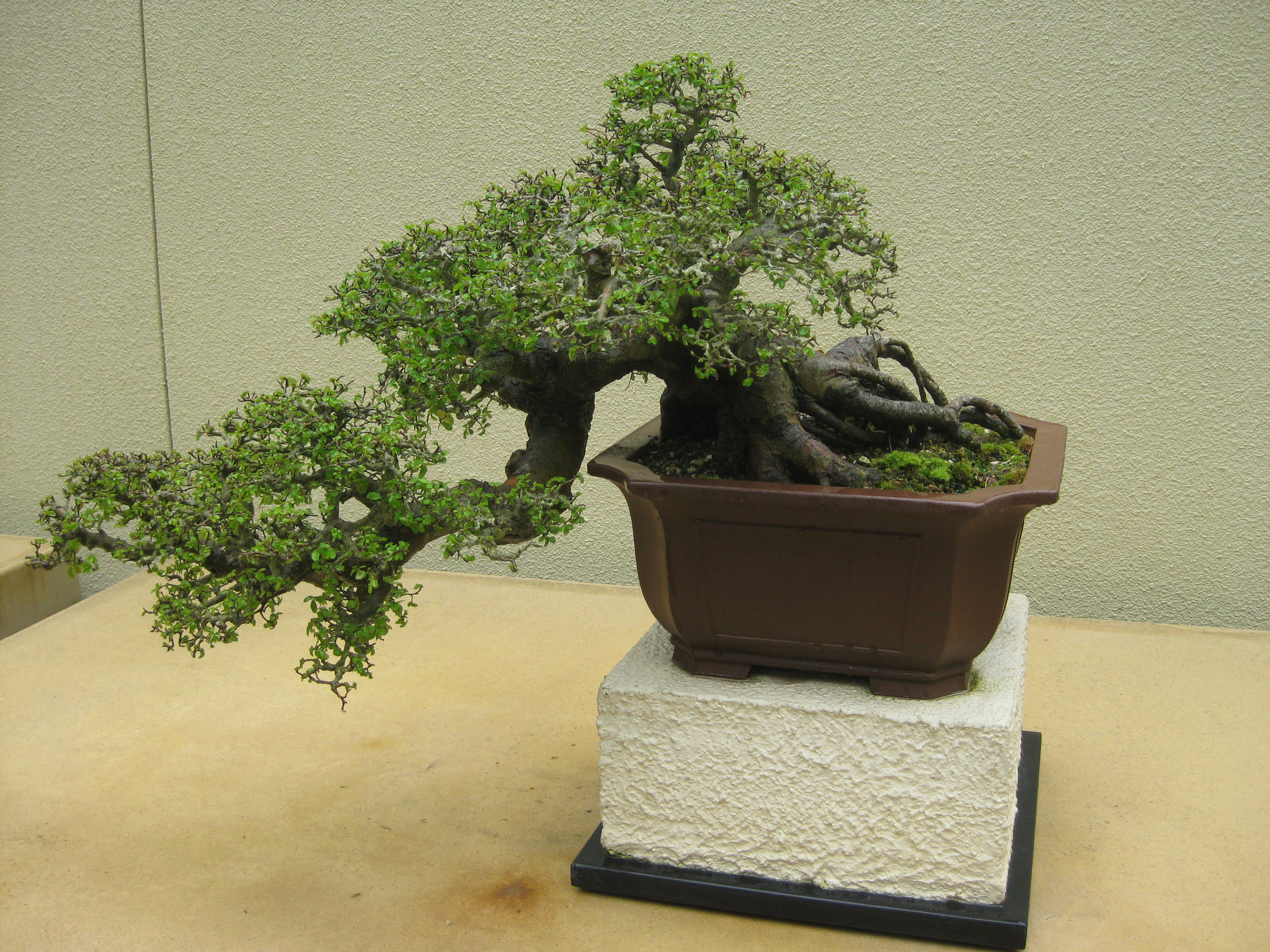
Chinese elm bonsai

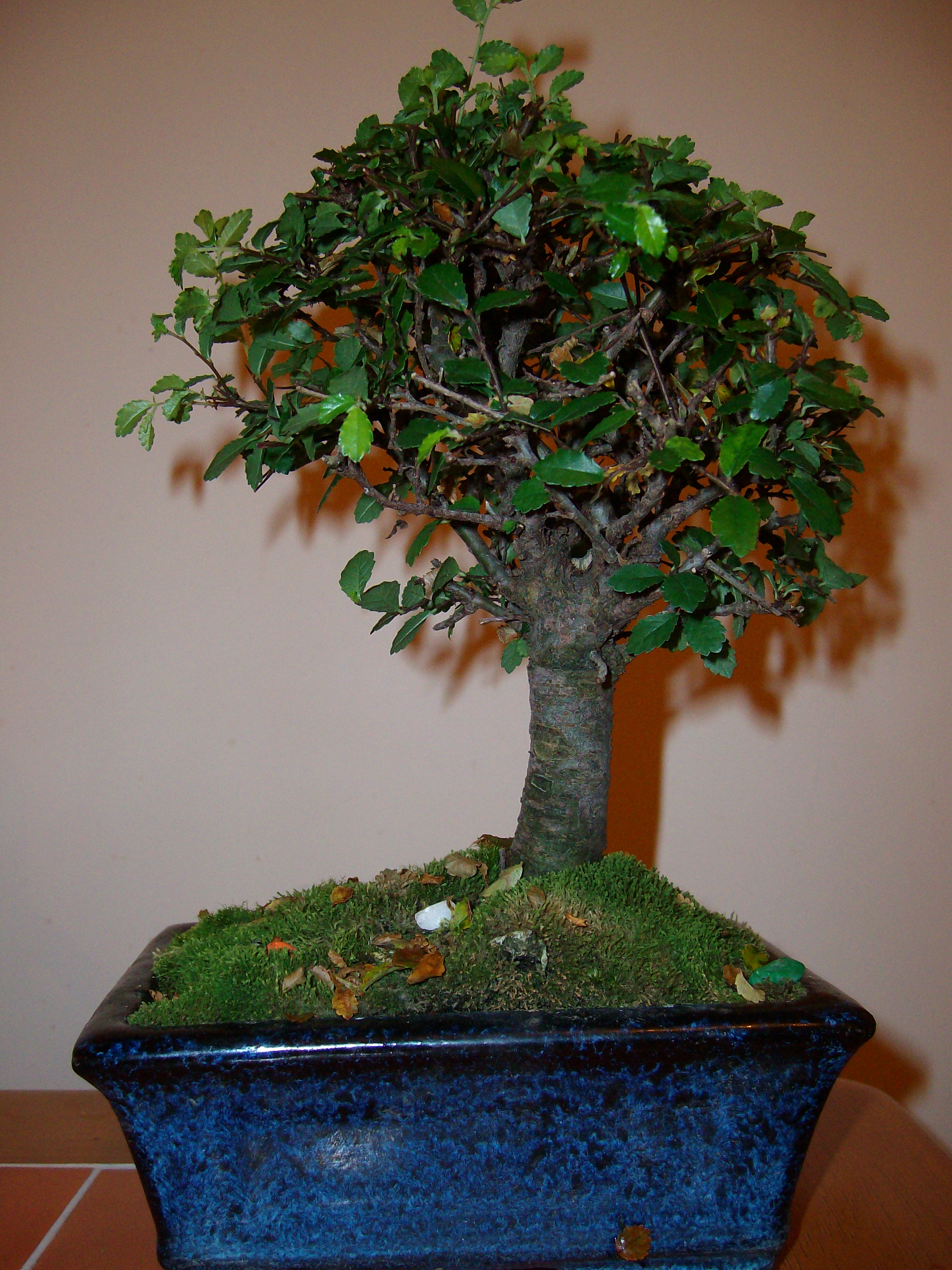
Chinese elm bonsai

== Naturalisation ==
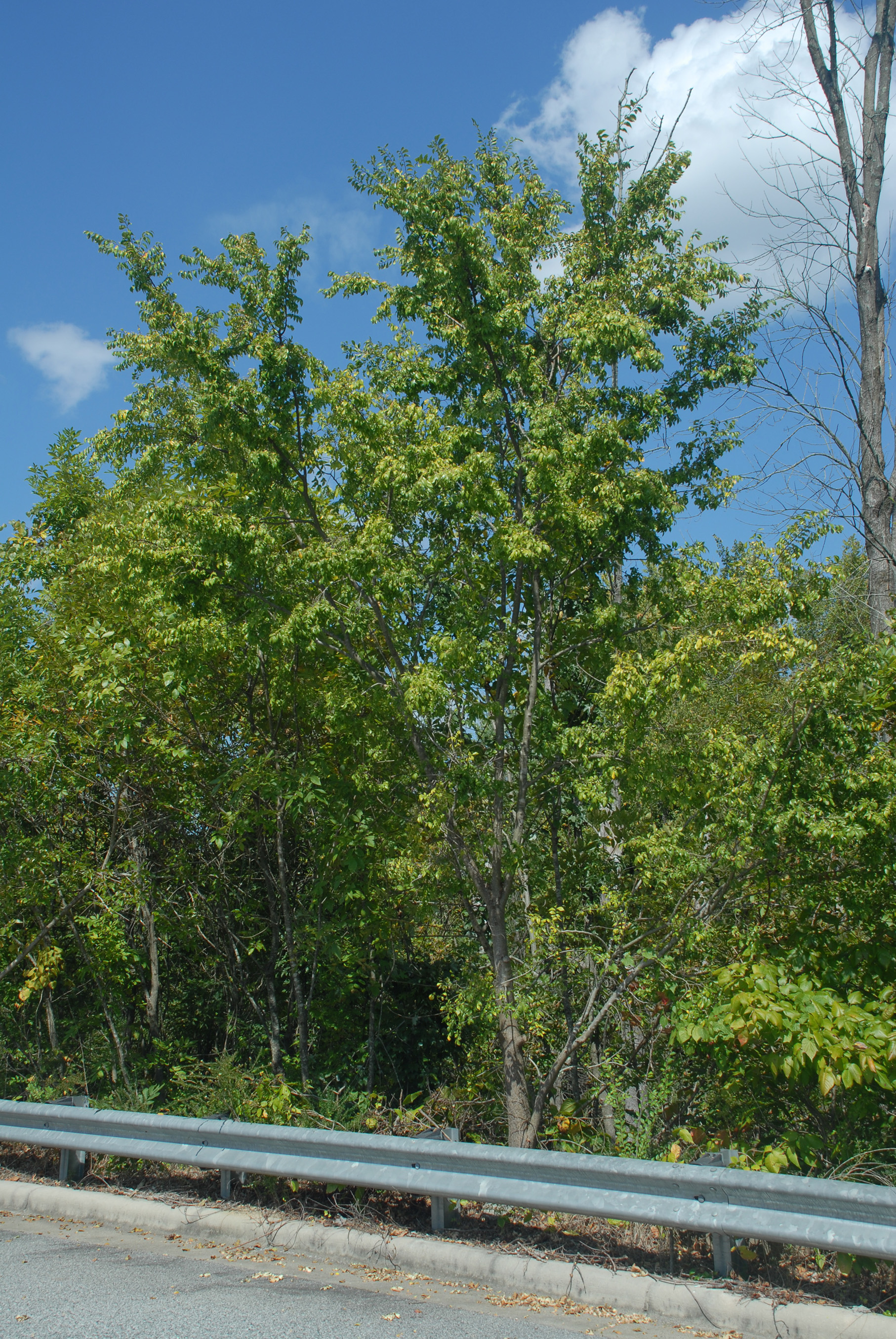
Naturalised U. parvifolia establishing itself by a roadside, Greensboro, North Carolina (2022)

U. parvifolia has become naturalised in various parts of the US, including Idaho, Oklahoma, West Virginia, and Kentucky. It is listed as invasive in District of Columbia, North Carolina, Nebraska, New Jersey, Virginia, and Wisconsin. As a "garden escape" it has also become naturalised in South Africa, where in 1904 it was described as "common near Irene", and in 1980 as "occasional" in Moreleta Park, both near Pretoria.

== Notable trees ==
The great Louguantai Temple Lang-yu elm, right (2010)

An old specimen, 25 m tall, with a bole-girth of 4.9 meters (2020), stands in front of the "Scripture-Speaking Platform" just inside the entrance to the Louguantai Temple in Tayu village, Shaanxi, where tradition says that Laozi composed the Tao Te Ching.

The tree in Central Park, New York City, planted in 1865 by James Hogg, from which the cultivar Central Park Splendor was cloned, was believed to be the oldest specimen of lacebark elm in the US at the time of its death in the 1990s, with a diameter at breast height of 1.4 m.

== Etymology ==
The name "lacebark elm", referring to the distinctive patchwork bark patterns, was suggested by E. W. Johnson of the Woodward, Oklahoma, USDA research station (who received U. parvifolia seed sent from the Far East by collector Frank Meyer around 1908), to reduce confusion with the Siberian elm, U. pumila, also called Chinese elm in the early days. Carl E. Whitcomb of Oklahoma State University, who raised the cultivar 'Prairie Shade', reintroduced the name "lacebark elm" in his Know It and Grow It: A Guide to the Identification and Use of Landscape Plants (1975).

== Cultivars ==
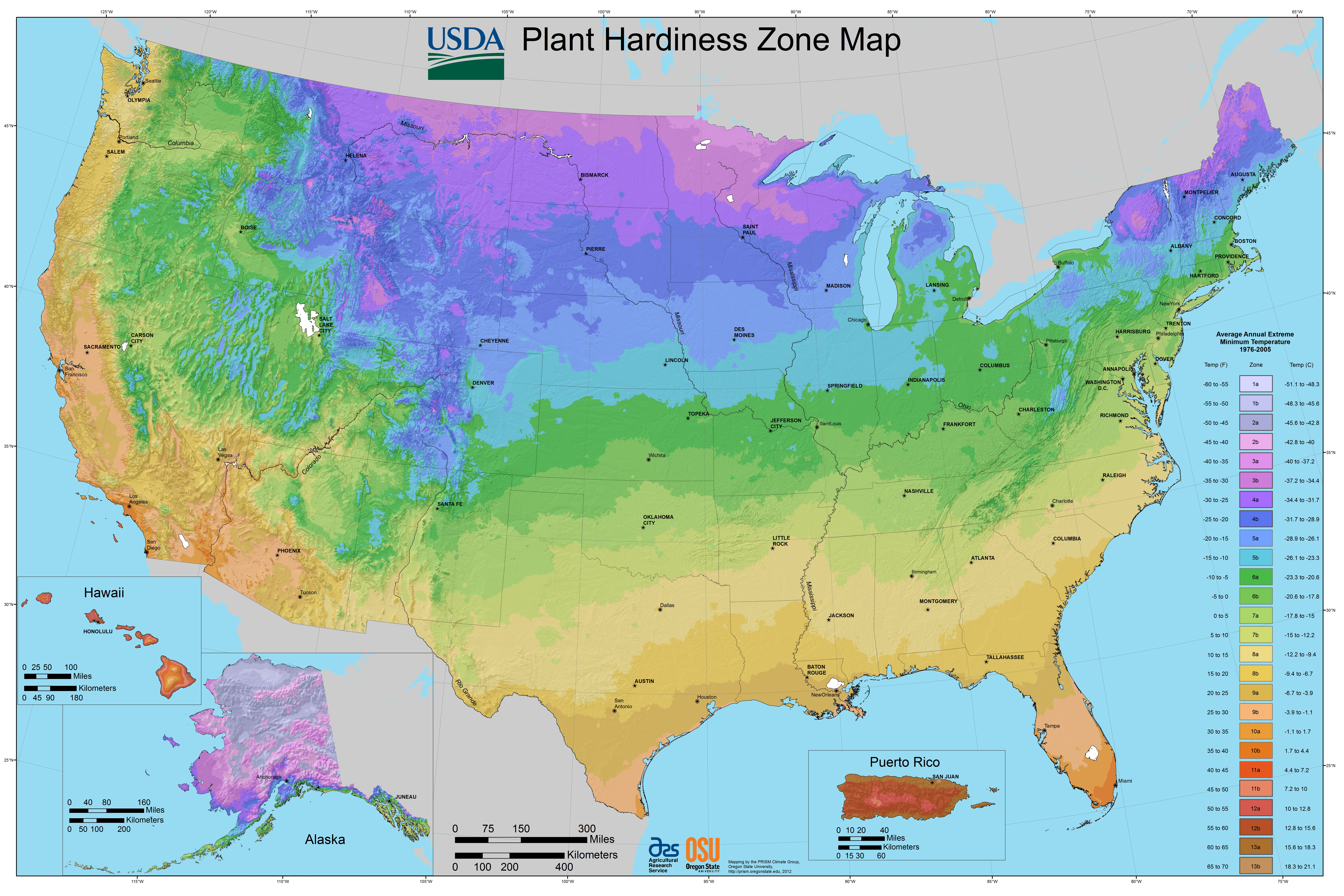
USDA hardiness zones

Numerous cultivars have been raised, mostly in the US. Broad, dense-canopied, drought-resilient clones such as 'Evergreen' (California, 1940s), 'True Green' (California, 1970s), and Athena (Georgia, 1990s) - the latter resembling Central Asian 'Densa'-type elms - were selected as shade trees for the south and southwest. 'Drake' (California, 1950s) was popularised through its use by Walt Disney landscape architects in their Florida and California theme parks, and was widely planted. Clones with tidy upright branching were sought for urban planting, notable releases being Allee and Bosque (Georgia, 1990s), both planted by the Oklahoma City National Memorial, while two columnar varieties, with the shape of Lombardy poplar, were released in the early 21st century – Everclear (Georgia) and DannaSpire (Ohio). Because Lacebark elm "struggles" north of USDA zone 6, cold-tolerant cultivars have been raised for northern areas, some hardy to USDA zone 5, like Central Park Splendor (Michigan, 1980s), and, notably, three to USDA zone 4: 'Hallelujah' (Missouri, 1990s), 'Matthew' (Ohio, 1990s), and Heritage (Illinois, 1990s) – the latter two also being "vase-shaped". Notable ornamentals include the variegated forms 'Frosty' and 'Geisha' (from Japan and the Netherlands respectively, c.1960s); an "aureate" form, 'Golden Rey' (Oklahoma, 1980s); and a number with red or purple autumnal foliage (the norm being yellow-brown), such as 'Burgundy' (Georgia, 1990s). First among ornamentals raised in south-eastern Australia is 'Yarralumla Weeper' (Canberra, 1930s), with pendulous outer branchlets, cultivated as an avenue tree in the Canberra area.

- A. Ross Central Park = Central Park Splendor
- BSNUPF = Everclear
- Blizzard
- Burgundy
- Burnley Select
- Catlin
- Chessins
- Churchyard
- Cork Bark
- D.B.Cole
- Drake
- Dynasty
- Ed Wood
- Elsmo
- Emer I or Emerald Isle = Athena
- Emer II or Emerald Vase = Allee
- Emerald Prairie
- Frosty
- Garden City Clone
- Geisha
- Glory
- Golden Rey
- Hallelujah
- Harzam = Harrison
- Hokkaido
- Jade Empress
- King's Choice
- Littleleaf
- Lois Hole
- Matthew
- Milliken
- Nire-keyaki
- Ohio
- Orange Ribbon
- Pathfinder
- Pendens
- Prairie Shade
- Prince Richard
- Red Fall
- Sabamiki
- Sagei
- Seiju
- Select 380
- Sempervirens
- Small Frye
- State Fair
- Stone's Dwarf
- Taiwan
- The Thinker
- Todd
- True Green
- UPMTF = Bosque
- Ware's
- Yarralumla
- Yatsubusa
- Zettler = Heritage

Of these, the following are non-dwarf, non-bonsai cultivars:

- A. Ross Central Park = Central Park Splendor
- BSNUPF = Everclear
- Blizzard
- Burgundy
- Burnley Select
- Churchyard
- D.B.Cole
- Drake
- Dynasty
- Elsmo
- Emer I or Emerald Isle = Athena
- Emer II or Emerald Vase = Allee
- Emerald Prairie
- Frosty
- Garden City Clone
- Geisha
- Glory
- Golden Rey
- Hallelujah
- Jade Empress
- King's Choice
- Matthew
- Milliken
- Ohio
- Orange Ribbon
- Pathfinder
- Pendens
- Prairie Shade
- Red Fall
- Select 380
- Sempervirens
- Small Frye
- State Fair
- The Thinker
- Todd
- UPMTF = Bosque
- Yarralumla
- Zettler = Heritage

== Hybrid cultivars ==
Ulmus parvifolia is an autumn-flowering species, whereas most other elms flower in the spring. Hybrids include:

- Frontier
- Rebella

== Accessions ==
North America

- Arnold Arboretum, US. Acc. nos. 1353-73, 17917, 195-90, 197-90.
- Bartlett Tree Experts, US. Acc. nos. 5546, 8109.
- Brenton Arboretum, Dallas Center, Iowa, US. No details available.
- Brooklyn Botanic Garden, New York City, US. Acc. nos. 000880, 160001, 20020466, 850222, X00450, X00485, X02727, X02771.
- Chicago Botanic Garden, US. 2 trees, no other details available.
- Dominion Arboretum, Ottawa, Ontario, Canada. No acc. details.
- Fullerton Arboretum, California State University, US. Acc. no. 80-036.
- Holden Arboretum, US. Acc. nos. 57-1241, 80-665, 84-1214, 90-323.
- Longwood Gardens, US. Acc. nos. 1957-1058, 1959-1500, 1960-1138, 1991-0981.
- Missouri Botanical Garden, St. Louis, US. Acc. nos. 1986-0108, 1986-0276, 1986-0277, 1987-0019, 199-3195, 1996-3462.
- Morris Arboretum, University of Pennsylvania, US. Acc. no. 32-0052-A.
- Morton Arboretum, US. Acc. nos. 991-27, 772-54, 1231–57, 558-83, 52-96.
- New York Botanical Garden, US. Acc. nos. 195/56, 486/91, 68072.
- Phipps Conservatory, US. Acc. nos. 83-006, 83-058, 91-050, 2001-212UN.
- Scott Arboretum, US. Acc. nos. 62210, 71765, 71767, 71771, 75152, 64441.
- Smith College, US. Acc. no. 42894.
- U S National Arboretum, Washington, D.C., US. Acc. nos. 58000/1/2/3/4/5/6/7/8.

Europe

- Brighton & Hove City Council, UK. NCCPG Elm Collection.
- Cambridge Botanic Garden, University of Cambridge, UK. No accession details available.
- Dyffryn Gardens, Glamorgan. UK champion, 13 m high, 37 cm d.b.h., last surveyed 1997.
- Grange Farm Arboretum, Sutton St. James, Spalding, Lincolnshire, UK. Acc. no. 516.
- Great Fontley Butterfly Conservation Elm Trials plantation, UK. One seedling planted 2019.
- Hortus Botanicus Nationalis, Salaspils, Latvia. Acc. nos. 18150, 18151.
- Linnaean Gardens of Uppsala, Sweden. Acc. no. 2002-1542.
- Royal Botanic Gardens Kew. Acc. nos. 1979-1613, 1979-1614, 1982–8479, 1982-8505, 1982-6280, 1982-6284, 2002-137, 2003-1267, 2005-1076.
- Royal Botanic Gardens Kew Wakehurst Place, UK. Acc. nos. 1969-33664, 1969-35133, 1973-21049, 1973-21525.
- Royal Horticultural Society Gardens, Wisley, UK. No details are available.
- Strona Arboretum, University of Life Sciences, Warsaw, Poland. No accession details are available.
- Tallinn Botanic Garden, Estonia. No accession details available.
- Thenford House arboretum, Banbury, UK. No details are available.
- University of Copenhagen Botanic Garden. Denmark. Acc. nos. S1956-1338, S1997-1304.
- Westonbirt Arboretum, Tetbury, Glos., UK. Planted 1981. No acc. no.

Australasia

- Eastwoodhill Arboretum, Gisborne, New Zealand. 9 trees, details not known.
