= Eimear Brannigan =

Dublin camogie player

Personal information
- Native name: Eimhear Ní Bhranagáin (Irish)
- Born: 1980 (age 45–46) Dublin Dublin, Ireland Ireland

Sport
- Sport: Camogie
Club*
Years	Club	Apps (scores)
	St Vincents	?
Inter-county**
Years	County	Apps (scores)
	Dublin	?
Inter-county titles
- All Stars: 2007
- * club appearances and scores correct as of (16:31, 30 December 2009 (UTC)). **Inter County team apps and scores correct as of (16:31, 30 December 2009 (UTC)).

Eimear Brannigan is a camogie player. She won All-Ireland Junior titles with Dublin in 2005 and 2006 captaining the side in 2005. She won an All Star award in 2007 and has a senior interprovincial honour with Leinster. She holds 10 Dublin Senior League titles with her club St Vincents, as well as 5 Championship medals and 1 Leinster Club title. She works as a Project Manager with Siemens Healthcare and is a regular contributor to RTÉ's The Sunday Game.
