= Emer O'Brien =

Emer O'Brien is an artist with a background in photography. Born in Dublin, Ireland, her family was forced to immigrate because of The Troubles. After the Good Friday Agreement was signed in 1998, she moved to London, where she lived and worked until Brexit. Since 2019 she has been based in Athens where she is the Professor of Photography at Deree College, the American College of Greece.

She studied at London College of Fashion, London (1999–2001) and then at Reading College of Art and Design (2001–2002) and graduated with a BA (Hons) from Oxford Brookes University (2002). She then completed her MA at Goldsmiths, University London (2002– 2003).

O'Brien is best known for works that mediate on the redundancy of human artefacts when deserted by man. Her recent large-scale installations like Run Run Run at the Wapping Project chart the intersection of technology and science with the natural and supernatural. O'Brien is also known for her photographs of horses. In 2004 O'Briens work was featured in The East End Academy exhibition at the Whitechapel Gallery. In 2008 O'Brien's work was selected by Humphrey Ocean for the Royal Academy Summer Exhibition.

Her final exhibition in the UK was during the 250th anniversary celebration at the Royal Academy where she exhibited a pamphlet celebrating the life of Lindsey Cockwell.
