= Milwaukee Project =

Program designed to improve IQ and scholastic achievement of at-risk children

The Milwaukee Project was the name given to a small study, begun in the 1960s, that provided nutritional, educational, and interpersonal support with the goal of improving the IQs and scholastic achievement of children born to very low-IQ mothers. It was sponsored by the National Institute of Handicapped Research. The study found a very large early effect on cognitive testing performance that gradually shrunk, and which did not provide lasting benefits to academic achievement. The study was criticized for methodological issues and lack of data transparency, and the lead researcher was convicted of misusing federal funds.

== The Project ==
Rick Heber of the University of Wisconsin–Madison examined the statistics of districts in the city of Milwaukee. His attention was drawn towards one district, where the residents had the lowest median income and lowest level of education in the city. The unemployment rate was also very high. Although this district contained only 3% of the city's population, 33% of all children who had been labeled "mentally retarded" lived there.

Funding for the project was provided by The National Institute of Handicapped Research, in Washington DC.

Heber selected 40 newborns from this district. All had a mother with an IQ lower than 75. In many cases the father was absent. The newborns were randomly assigned to an experimental and a control group. Mothers of children in the experimental group received education and vocational rehabilitation.The children attended an onsite Infant/Child Care program where they received a high quality educational program designed to develop language and cognitive skills. They also received three balanced meals a day. They stayed there five days a week, seven hours a day. When the children were six the program ended and the children attended local schools. Both the experimental group and the control group were tested an equal number of times throughout the project.

== Findings ==
According to Heber and colleagues, by age six all of the children from the experimental group had higher IQs than all of the children from the control group. Mean IQ was 120 in the experimental group and 87 in the control group. After the children left the program their IQs started declining. By the time both groups were ten years old the IQs of the children of the experimental group had decreased to 105. Mean IQ in the control group was 85.

At age 14, the children in the experimental group had a mean IQ ten points above that of the control group, but the scholastic achievement scores of the experimental group were not better than those of the control group. Both groups performed in school as would be expected from children with a mean IQ of 80. For this reason, Arthur Jensen has suggested that the Milwaukee Project did not produce permanent intelligence gains, but that the IQ gains it showed were due to an indirect form of "teaching to the test".

== Reception, Criticism, & Scandal ==
The Milwaukee Project's claimed success was celebrated in the popular media and by famous psychologists.

A 1990 paper criticized the study for methodological problems: "questionable equivalence experimental and control groups, confusion over subject attrition and replacement, normative obsolescence of assessment devices, and inadequate independent IQ assessment". While it has been described as an RCT, the study used reassignment and did not use statistical controls. It has been described as low quality evidence.

Later in the project, the principal investigator Rick Heber was discharged from the University of Wisconsin–Madison and convicted and imprisoned for large-scale abuse of federal funding for private gain. Two of Heber's colleagues in the project were also convicted for similar abuses. Heber did not respond to requests from colleagues for raw data and technical details of the study.

Nevertheless, many college textbooks in psychology and education have uncritically reported the project's results. This has been cited as an example of ideas entering the educational system before undergoing rigorous peer review.
