= Rick Heber =

American psychologist

- Born: Richard Franz Heber; January 12, 1932 (age 94)
- Education: University of Arkansas; Michigan State University; George Peabody College
- Known for: Mental retardation Milwaukee Project
- Scientific career
- Fields: Educational psychology
- Workplaces: University of Wisconsin–Madison
- Theses: A cross-cultural comparison of children's judgment of parent-child conflict in Germany, England, Finland, United States and Mexico (1955); Expectancy and expectancy changes in normal and mentally retarded boys (1957)

Richard Franz Heber (born January 12, 1932) is an American educational psychologist and expert on intellectual disability. He is known for his work on the Milwaukee Project, and for his subsequent conviction on charges of fraud and misuse of federal funds. As a result of this conviction, Heber was sentenced to a three-year term in a federal prison in Bastrop, Texas.

== Early life and education ==
Heber was born on January 12, 1932. He completed a BA at the University of Arkansas in 1953, followed by serving as principal of the Manitoba School for Mental Deficiency for a year, then completing an MA at Michigan State University, in 1955. A PhD at George Peabody College followed in 1957.

== Academic career ==
In 1959, Heber joined the faculty of the University of Wisconsin–Madison as coordinator of the special education program. He later chaired the President's Panel on Mental Retardation during the presidency of John F. Kennedy. Until December 1980, he was director of the University of Wisconsin's Center on Mental Retardation and Human Development.

=== Milwaukee Project ===
In the 1960s, Heber and his colleagues helped to initiate the Milwaukee Project, an early intervention program involving 20 ghetto children, with Heber later assuming the role of director of the project. A total of $14 million was eventually spent on the project, which led Ellis Batten Page to describe it as "grotesquely costly". The early results reported from the project were that the children's IQs had been raised by about 30 points, and that even children whose mothers had mental retardation were able to benefit from intensive mathematics education programs during the first several years of project instruction. However, despite considerable popular media coverage of the project's purported results, few details of the project were reported in peer-reviewed journals. Soon after the project's results were first described in a brief 1972 conference presentation, its methodology was criticized by Page, who criticized it for "biased selection of treatment groups; contamination of criterion tests; and failure to specify the treatments". Kavale and Mostert concluded in 2004 that "the rather telling criticisms offered" of the project "were never really answered", despite Heber and his colleagues having numerous opportunities to do so.

== Criminal conviction ==
From January to October 1981, a series of articles were published in the Madison, Wisconsin newspaper The Capital Times revealing that Heber and his associates had inappropriately diverted research funds for personal use. Revelations from these stories included that Heber and his associate Patrick Flanagan had diverted $165,000 of such funds into their personal bank accounts, and that Heber's legal residence was in Colorado, despite the fact that he was being paid for "full-time" work in Wisconsin. Heber and several of his associates were subsequently charged with multiple federal offenses, including conspiracy to commit fraud, as well as multiple state charges, including embezzlement and tax evasion. On July 30, 1981, Heber was found guilty of multiple federal charges of diverting research funds in a federal court in Madison, for which he was later sentenced to three years in prison. Several months afterward, Heber was sentenced to four additional years in prison by a state court, to be served concurrently with his federal sentence. Heber and Flanagan were also both ordered to repay the funds that they had stolen. This conviction has led to questions about the validity of the Milwaukee Project's reported results. According to Cecil Reynolds and Marie Almond, "It is now questionable whether the project ever actually existed as it had been described by Heber." Similarly, Gilhousen et al. argued in 1990 that "The failure of the principal investigator, Howard Garber, to respond to methodological criticisms and questions regarding the impact of Rick Heber's criminal activities on the integrity of the project data does nothing to quell the cloud of suspicion surrounding the research." In contrast, Kavale and Mostert noted that "The consensus was that...it was a mistake to assume that convictions for fraud in any way implied the presence of fraudulent data."
