= Julieanna Hever =

American dietitian

- Occupation: Dietitian

Julieanna Hever (known as the Plant-Based Dietician) is an American registered dietitian and advocate of plant-based nutrition.

== Biography ==
Hever received a bachelor's degree from University of California, Los Angeles and a Masters of Science in nutrition from California State University, Northridge where she completed her Dietetic Internship. She worked as a clinical dietitian at Century City Doctors Hospital. Since 2005 she has worked as a registered dietitian in Los Angeles. She is a consultant to Forks Over Knives and a nutrition columnist for VegNews magazine.

Her 2014 book The Vegiterranian Diet focuses on improving the Mediterranean diet into a lower-fat whole food entirely plant-based approach. According to Hever if fish and vegetable oils are removed from the Mediterranean diet then it is a whole food plant-based diet.

In 2021, Hever authored The Choose You Now Diet which contains 75 whole food, plant-based recipes. Hever is a council member of True Health Initiative.

== Personal life ==
Hever is an ethical vegan in her personal life. She became interested in plant-based dieting after reading John Robbins’ book Diet for a New America as a teenager.

== Selected publications ==
- The Complete Idiot's Guide to Plant-Based Nutrition (DK Publishing, 2011)
- The Vegiterranean Diet: The New and Improved Mediterranean Eating Plan (Hachette Books, 2014)
- Plant-Based Diets: A Physician’s Guide (The Permanente Journal, 2016)
- Plant-Based Nutrition for Healthcare Professionals (Journal of Geriatric Cardiology, 2017)
- Plant-Based Nutrition, Second Edition (Penguin, 2018) [with Raymond J. Cronise]
- The Choose You Now Diet (Alpha, 2021)
- Cronise, Raymond J.; Hever, Julieanna (December 17, 2019). The Healthspan Solution. DK Publishing. ISBN 9781465497598.
