= Harold Hever =

English cricketer

Personal information
- Full name: Harold Lawrence Hever
- Born: 23 June 1895; Southborough, Kent
- Died: 18 July 1958 (aged 63) (Note: Hever's year of death is a matter of some confusion. CricInfo and CricketArchive both date his death to 18 July 1958, and this is confirmed by Dudley Moore's The History of Kent County Cricket Club and Howard Milton's Kent Cricketers, although Milton notes that the dates of Hever's birth and death had both previously been recorded differently. Wisden published an obituary in the 1972 edition of the almanack, dating his death in the previous year, although in the 1973 edition it corrected his year of death to 1970 and Derek Carlaw gives his date of death as 18 July 1971. The date of 1958 is supported by genealogical information and is presumed to be correct.); Pembury, Kent
- Batting: Left-handed
- Bowling: Slow left-arm orthodox
- Role: Bowler

Domestic team information
- Years: Team
- 1921–1925: Kent
- FC debut: 2 July 1921 Kent v Essex
- Last FC: 1 August 1925 HDG Leveson Gower's XI v Glamorgan

Career statistics
| Competition | First-class |
|---|---|
| Matches | 7 |
| Runs scored | 25 |
| Batting average | 5.00 |
| 100s/50s | 0/0 |
| Top score | 11* |
| Balls bowled | 932 |
| Wickets | 15 |
| Bowling average | 26.06 |
| 5 wickets in innings | 0 |
| 10 wickets in match | 0 |
| Best bowling | 3/57 |
| Catches/stumpings | 4/– |
- Source: CricInfo, 10 March 2017

Harold Lawrence Hever (23 June 1895 – 18 July 1958) was an English cricketer. He played seven first-class matches between 1921 and 1925, six of them for Kent County Cricket Club where he was a professional on the playing staff.

== Early life and military service ==
Hever was born at Southborough near Tunbridge Wells in Kent in 1895. He was the son of Thomas and Anne Hever (née Shoebridge). He grew up in Southborough, living with his mother after his father died in 1899. A machinist in a print shop by trade, Hever enlisted in 3 Company Kent Fortress Royal Engineers in 1912, a part-time Territorial Force unit based at Southborough.

After war broke out in 1914, Hever served abroad with 3 Company, attached to 52nd (Lowland) Infantry Division during the Gallipoli Campaign where he survived the sinking of HMS Hythe. (Note: Hythe, a converted civilian vessel, was involved in a collision with HMS Sarnia in the Dardanelles as it was ferrying the men of 3 Company from Mudros to Suvla Bay in the early hours of 28 October 1915. Over 100 members of the company died in the incident; 82 surviving men were landed at Cape Helles on 20 November.) He later served on the Western Front in France where the company was attached to the 29th Division. He was promoted to the rank of second corporal before being taken prisoner, along with much of the rest of the company, as the result of a German counterattack during the Battle of Cambrai in November 1917.

== Cricket ==
Following the end of the war, Hever had trials with Kent in both 1919 and 1920 before being taken on to the professional playing staff as a left-arm orthodox spin bowler who varied his pace. (Note: The Times described his bowling as "medium pace" in 1925.) He made his debut for the county Second XI in late June 1921, taking three wickets in a Minor Counties Championship match against Cambridgeshire at Blackheath, before making his First XI debut in early July, going wicketless in the six overs he bowled against Essex at Leyton. Good performances with the ball in Second XI matches saw him recalled to the First XI at the end of August and Hever took his maiden first-class wicket against Northants at Dover.

Kent had a number of high profile spin bowlers who were well established in the team during the 1920s, including Tich Freeman and Frank Woolley, and opportunities were limited for Hever to play First XI cricket―despite The Times description of him as having a "nice, easy [bowling] action" and likening his temperament to that of Colin Blythe, Kent's great left-arm spin bowler from the years before World War I. He appeared twice in the County Championship in 1922 and only once in both of 1924 and 1925, taking a total of nine wickets for Kent in his six first-class matches. Three of these came in a "remarkable" Kent victory against Gloucestershire at Maidstone in 1925 where, according to The Times he "bowled a splendid length".

He played regularly for the Second XI―his Wisden obituary credits his "much good work"―and played 38 Minor Counties Championship matches between 1921 and 1925. He made his final first-class appearance for HDG Leveson Gower's XI in a match against Glamorgan at Swansea in August 1925, taking six wickets, with three in each innings―including his best first-class bowling figures of 3/57. The Times again commented on the ease of his bowling action, and suggested that he was "perhaps the best" of Kent's three left-arm bowlers, although it was of the opinion that he would be "more successful if he bowled a trifle straighter and made the batsman play at him". Despite the paper's optimism that Hever would be a useful addition to Kent's bowling attack "in the near future", following Kent's tour of Scotland in September he withdrew from the playing staff at the end of the season, although he played occasionally for the Second XI until 1928, making a further four Minor Counties Championship appearances.

== Later life ==
Hever played club cricket for Linden Park Cricket Club and was a member at Culverden Golf Club for many years. He worked in the print industry, running the warehouse department of the Kent and Sussex Courier towards the end of his career. He married Eveline King in 1924. Hever died at Pembury near Tunbridge Wells in 1958. He was aged 63.

== Bibliography ==
- Carlaw, Derek (2020). Kent County Cricketers, A to Z: Part Two (1919–1939) (PDF). Cardiff: ACS.
