= Herber =

Herber is a German surname. Notable people with the surname include:

- Arnie Herber (1910–1969), American football quarterback
- Dirk Herber (born 1979), German politician
- Johannes Herber (born 1983), German basketball player
- Keith Herber (1949–2009), American author, editor, and musician
- Mark D. Herber, British author
- Maxi Herber (1920–2006), German figure skater
- Oliver Herber (born 1981), German footballer
- Veronica Herber, New Zealand artist
