= Éibhear =

Given name

Éibhear is an Irish language male given name of uncertain origin. The word eibhear in Irish means granite. Éibhear Fionn the son of Míl, was one of the mythological founders of the Irish people, the Milesians. The Irish Éibhear was anglicised as Heber or Eber, though the closest modern equivalent is the name "Harry".

== See also ==
- List of Irish-language given names
- Harry (given name)
