= Sexual intercourse =

Penetrative sexual activity for reproduction or sexual pleasure

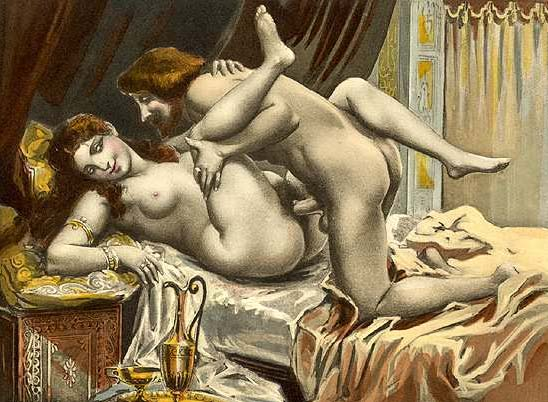
The missionary position, painted by Édouard-Henri Avril (1892), inspired by the erotic sonnets of Pietro Aretino showing male-female sexual penetration

Sex, more formally known as sexual intercourse, coitus, or copulation, is an intimate social activity typically involving the insertion of the erect male penis inside the female vagina and followed by thrusting motions for erotic pleasure, biological reproduction, or both. This specific type of sex is also known as vaginal intercourse (or vaginal sex). However, other forms of penetrative sexual intercourse are also possible, including anal sex (penetration of the anus by the penis), oral sex (penetration of the mouth by the penis or oral contact with or penetration of the female genitalia), fingering (sexual penetration by the fingers) and penetration by use of a dildo (especially a strap-on dildo), and vibrators. The desire for these activities is grounded in natural human instinct and they involve physical intimacy between two or more people, usually enacted by humans solely for physical-emotional pleasure, sometimes contributing to human bonding.

There are different views on what constitutes sexual intercourse or other sexual activity, which can impact views of sexual health. Although sexual intercourse, particularly the term coitus, generally denotes penile–vaginal penetration and the possibility of creating offspring, it also commonly denotes penetrative oral sex and penile–anal sex, especially the latter. It usually encompasses any sexual penetration (a term especially common in statutory law), while non-penetrative sex has been labeled outercourse, but non-penetrative sex may also be considered sexual intercourse by some people or in some less-common definitions. Because people can be at risk of contracting sexually transmitted infections during these activities, safer sex practices are recommended by health professionals to reduce transmission risk.

Various jurisdictions place restrictions on certain sexual acts, such as adultery, incest, sexual activity with minors, prostitution, rape, zoophilia, sodomy, premarital sex and extramarital sex. Religious beliefs also play a role in personal decisions about sexual intercourse or other sexual activity, such as decisions about virginity, or legal and public policy matters. Religious views on sexuality vary significantly between different religions and sects of the same religion, though there are common themes, such as prohibition of adultery.

Reproductive sexual intercourse between non-human animals is more often called copulation, and sperm may be introduced into the female's reproductive tract in non-vaginal ways among the animals, such as by cloacal copulation. For most non-human mammals, mating and copulation occur at the point of estrus (the most fertile period of time in the female's reproductive cycle), which increases the chances of successful impregnation. However, bonobos, dolphins and chimpanzees are known to engage in sexual intercourse regardless of whether the female is in estrus, and to engage in sex acts with same-sex partners. Like humans engaging in sexual activity primarily for pleasure, this behavior in these animals is also presumed to be for pleasure, and a contributing factor to strengthening their social bonds.

== Behaviors ==
=== Definitions ===
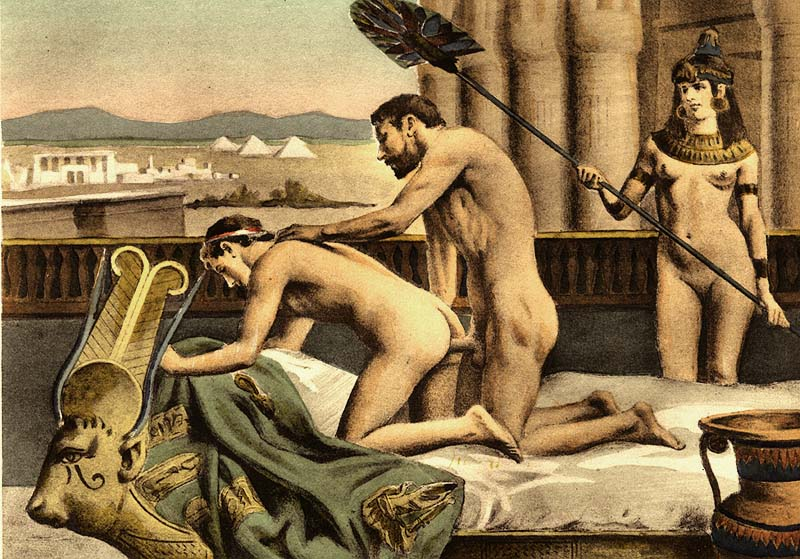
19th-century erotic interpretation of Roman emperor Hadrian and Antinous engaged in anal intercourse, by Édouard-Henri Avril

Sexual intercourse may be called coitus, copulation, coition, or intercourse. Coitus is derived from the Latin word coitio or coire, meaning "a coming together or joining together" or "to go together", and is known under different ancient Latin names for a variety of sexual activities, but usually denotes penile–vaginal penetration. This is often called vaginal intercourse or vaginal sex. Vaginal sex, and less often vaginal intercourse, may also denote any vaginal sexual activity, particularly if penetrative, including sexual activity between lesbian couples. Copulation, by contrast, more often denotes the mating process, especially for non-human animals; it can mean a variety of sexual activities between opposite-sex or same-sex pairings, but generally means the sexually reproductive act of transferring sperm from a male to a female or sexual procreation between a man and a woman.

Although sex and having sex also most commonly denote penile–vaginal intercourse, sex can be significantly broad in its meaning and may cover any penetrative or non-penetrative sexual activity between two or more people. The World Health Organization (WHO) states that non-English languages and cultures use different words for sexual activity, "with slightly different meanings". Various vulgarisms, slang, and euphemisms are used for sexual intercourse or other sexual activity, such as fuck, screw, shag, and the phrase "sleep together". The laws of some countries use the euphemism, carnal knowledge. Penetration of the vagina by the erect penis is additionally known as intromission, or by the Latin name immissio penis (Latin for "insertion of the penis"). The age of first sexual intercourse is called sexarche.

Vaginal, anal and oral sex are recognized as sexual intercourse more often than other sexual behaviors. Sexual activity that does not involve penile-vaginal sex or other sexual penetration might be used to retain virginity (sometimes called technical virginity) or labeled outercourse. One reason virginity loss is often based on penile–vaginal intercourse is because heterosexual couples may engage in anal or oral sex as a way of being sexually active while maintaining that they are virgins since they have not engaged in the reproductive act of coitus. Some gay men consider frot or oral sex as a way of maintaining their virginities, with penile-anal penetration used as sexual intercourse and for virginity loss, while other gay men may consider frot or oral sex as their main forms of sexual activity. Lesbians may categorize oral sex or fingering as sexual intercourse and subsequently an act of virginity loss, or tribadism as a primary form of sexual activity.

Plates 15 and 16 from John Roberton's The Generative System (1824). Plate 15 (left) shows the adaptation of the glans penis and vagina during intercourse; Plate 16 (right) illustrates the suction and collapse of the vagina.

Researchers commonly use sexual intercourse to denote penile–vaginal intercourse while using specific words, such as anal sex or oral sex, for other sexual behaviors. Scholars Richard M. Lerner and Laurence Steinberg state that researchers also "rarely disclose" how they conceptualize sex "or even whether they resolved potential discrepancies" in conceptualizations of sex. Lerner and Steinberg attribute researchers' focus on penile–vaginal sex to "the larger culture's preoccupation with this form of sexual activity", and have expressed concern that the "widespread, unquestioned equation of penile–vaginal intercourse with sex reflects a failure to examine systematically 'whether the respondent's understanding of the question [about sexual activity] matches what the researcher had in mind'". This focus can also relegate other forms of mutual sexual activity to foreplay or contribute to them not being regarded as "real sex", and limits the meaning of rape. It may also be that conceptually conflating sexual activity with vaginal intercourse and sexual function hinders and limits information about sexual behavior that non-heterosexual people may be engaging in, or information about heterosexuals who may be engaging in non–vaginal sexual activity.

Studies regarding the meaning of sexual intercourse sometimes come into conflict. While most consider penile–vaginal intercourse to be sex, whether anal or oral intercourse are considered sex is more debatable, with oral sex ranking lowest. The Centers for Disease Control and Prevention (CDC) stated that "although there are only limited national data about how often adolescents engage in oral sex, some data suggest that many adolescents who engage in oral sex do not consider it to be 'sex'; therefore they may use oral sex as an option to experience sex while still, in their minds, remaining abstinent". Upton et al. stated, "It is possible that individuals who engage in oral sex, but do not consider it as 'sex', may not associate the acts with the potential health risks they can bring." In other cases, condom use is a factor, with some men stating that sexual activity involving the protection of a condom is not "real sex" or "the real thing". This view is common among men in Africa, where sexual activity involving the protection of a condom is often associated with emasculation because condoms prevent direct penile–to–skin genital contact.

=== Stimulation ===
Sexual intercourse or other sexual activity can encompass various sexually stimulating factors (physiological stimulation or psychological stimulation), including different sex positions (such as the missionary position, the most common human sex position) or the use of sex toys. Foreplay may precede some sexual activities, often leading to sexual arousal of the partners and resulting in the erection of the penis or natural lubrication of the vagina. It is also common for people to be as sexually satisfied by being kissed, touched erotically, or held as they are during sexual intercourse.

Non-primate females copulate only when in estrus, but sexual intercourse is possible at any time of the menstrual cycle for women. Sex pheromones facilitate copulatory reflexes in various organisms, but, in humans, the detection of pheromones is impaired and they have only residual effects. Non-primate females put themselves in the crucial lordosis position and remain motionless, but these motor copulatory reflexes are no longer functional in women.

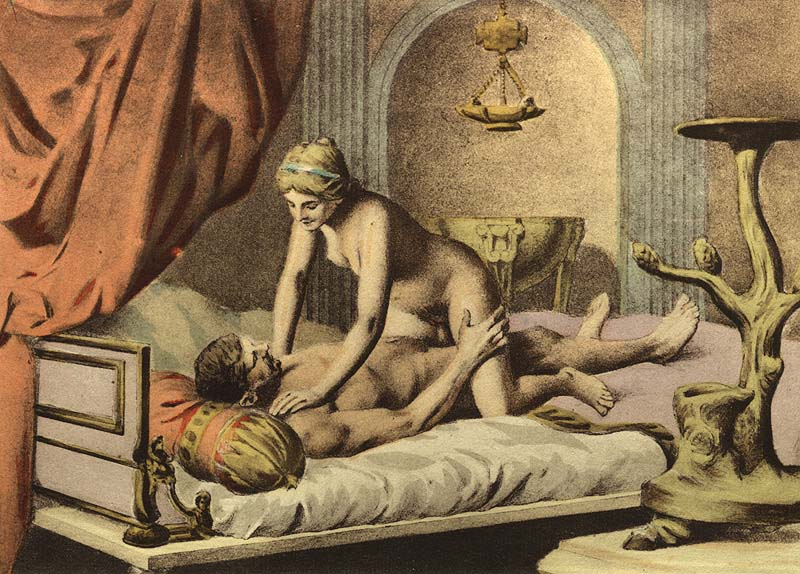
Édouard-Henri Avril depiction of a woman on top position, a position that is more likely to stimulate the clitoris

During coitus, the partners orient their hips to allow the penis to move back and forth in the vagina to cause friction, typically without fully removing the penis. In this way, they stimulate themselves and each other, often continuing until orgasm in either or both partners is achieved.

For human females, stimulation of the clitoris plays a significant role in sexual activity; 70–80% of women require direct clitoral stimulation to achieve orgasm, though indirect clitoral stimulation (for example, via vaginal intercourse) may also be sufficient (see orgasm in females). Because of this, some couples may engage in the woman on top position or the coital alignment technique, a technique combining the "riding high" variation of the missionary position with pressure-counterpressure movements performed by each partner in rhythm with sexual penetration, to maximize clitoral stimulation.

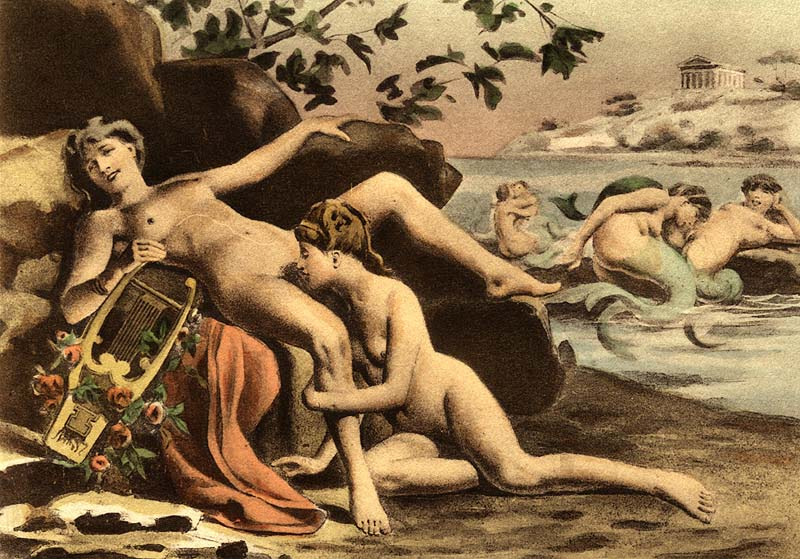
Édouard-Henri Avril depiction of cunnilingus in the life of Sappho

Anal sex involves stimulation of the anus, anal cavity, sphincter valve or rectum; it most commonly means the insertion of a man's penis into another person's rectum, but may also mean the use of sex toys or fingers to penetrate the anus, or oral sex on the anus (anilingus), or pegging.

Oral sex consists of all the sexual activities that involve the use of the mouth and throat to stimulate genitalia or anus. It is sometimes performed to the exclusion of all other forms of sexual activity, and may include the ingestion or absorption of semen (during fellatio) or vaginal fluids (during cunnilingus).

Fingering involves the digital manipulation of the clitoris, rest of the vulva, vagina or anus for the purpose of sexual arousal and sexual stimulation; it may constitute the entire sexual encounter or it may be part of mutual masturbation, foreplay or other sexual activities.

=== Reproduction ===
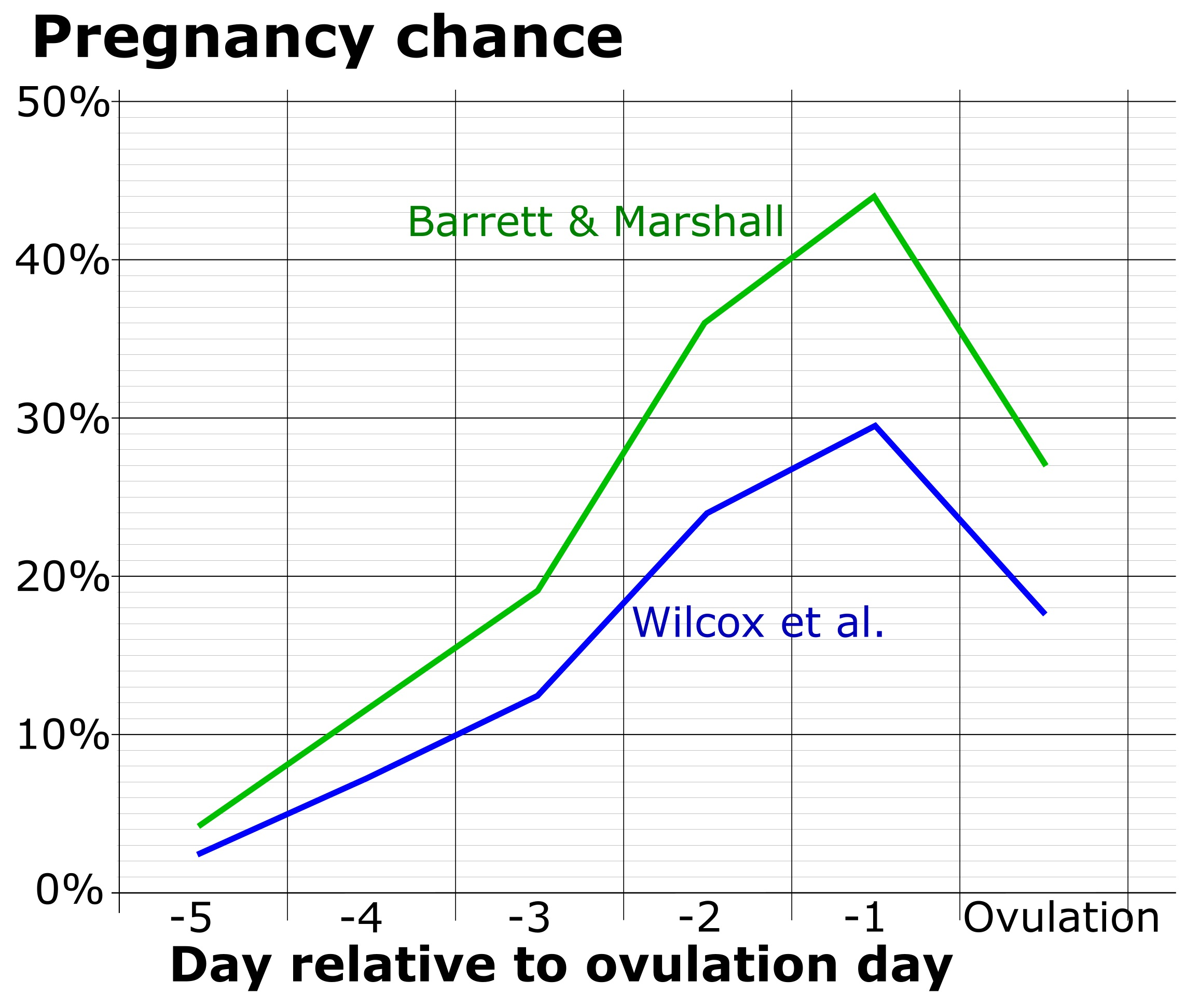
Chance of fertilization by menstrual cycle day relative to ovulation

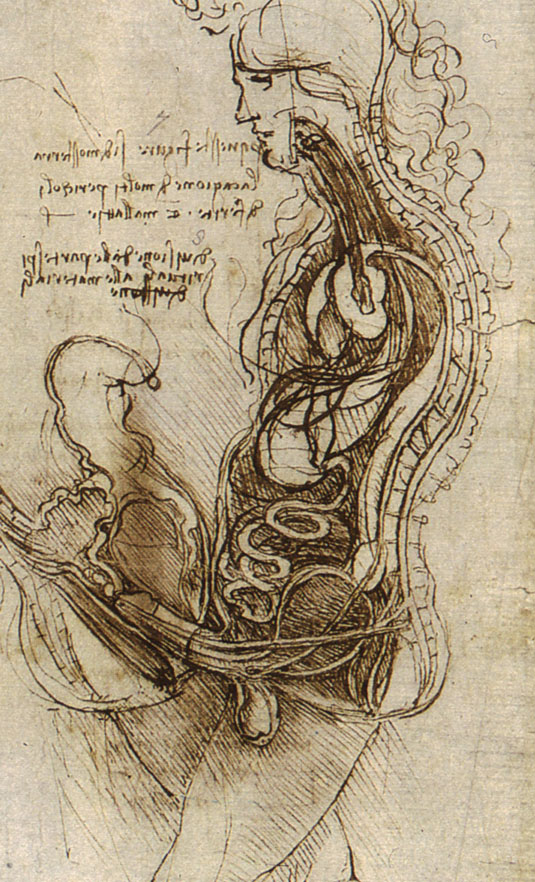
"Coition of a Hemisected Man and Woman" (c. 1492), an interpretation of what happens inside the body during coitus, by Leonardo da Vinci

Natural human reproduction involves penile–vaginal penetration, during which semen, containing male gametes known as sperm cells or spermatozoa, is ejaculated through the penis into the vagina. The sperm passes through the vaginal vault, cervix and into the uterus, and then into the fallopian tubes. Millions of sperm are ejaculated to increase the chances of fertilization (see sperm competition), but only one is sufficient to fertilize an egg or ovum. When a fertile ovum from the female is present in the fallopian tubes, the male gamete fertilizes the ovum, forming a new embryo. Pregnancy begins after the fertilized ovum is implanted in the lining of the uterus (the endometrium).

Pregnancy rates for sexual intercourse are highest during the menstrual cycle time from some five days before until approximately one day after ovulation (this is sometimes called the fertile window). For optimal pregnancy chance, there are recommendations of vaginal intercourse every one or two days, or every two or three days. Some people who are trying to conceive may choose to time vaginal intercourse with the fertile window, a practice that is sometimes called 'timed intercourse'. Timed intercourse using urine tests that predict ovulation may help improve the rate of pregnancy and live births for some couples trying to conceive such as those who have been trying for less than 12 months and who are under 40 years old; however, it is not clear from medical evidence if timed intercourse improves the rate of ultrasound-confirmed pregnancies and it is also not clear if timed intercourse has an effect on a person's level of stress or their quality of life. Studies have shown no significant difference between different sex positions and pregnancy rate, as long as it results in ejaculation into the vagina.

When a sperm donor has sexual intercourse with a woman who is not his partner and for the sole purpose of impregnating the woman, this may be known as natural insemination, as opposed to artificial insemination. Artificial insemination is a form of assisted reproductive technology, which are methods used to achieve pregnancy by artificial or partially artificial means. For artificial insemination, sperm donors may donate their sperm through a sperm bank, and the insemination is performed with the express intention of attempting to impregnate the female; to this extent, its purpose is the medical equivalent of sexual intercourse. Intracervical insemination (ICI), which involves the deposit of (usually) raw semen in the vagina of a woman, is in effect a substitute for intercourse and is often contrasted with 'normal intercourse' in this context. Reproductive methods also extend to gay and lesbian couples. For gay male pairings, there is the option of surrogate pregnancy; for lesbian couples, there is donor insemination in addition to choosing surrogate pregnancy. Some women use artificial insemination to become single mothers by choice.

=== Safe sex and birth control ===
There are a variety of safe sex methods that are practiced by heterosexual and same-sex couples, including non-penetrative sex acts, and heterosexual couples may use oral or anal sex (or both) as a means of birth control. However, pregnancy can still occur with anal sex or other forms of sexual activity if the penis is near the vagina (such as during intercrural sex or other genital-genital rubbing) and its sperm is deposited near the vagina's entrance and travels along the vagina's lubricating fluids; the risk of pregnancy can also occur without the penis being near the vagina because sperm may be transported to the vaginal opening by the vagina coming in contact with fingers or other non-genital body parts that have come in contact with semen.

Safe sex is a relevant harm reduction philosophy and condoms are used as a form of safe sex and contraception. Condoms are widely recommended for the prevention of sexually transmitted infections (STIs). According to reports by the National Institutes of Health (NIH) and World Health Organization (WHO), correct and consistent use of latex condoms reduces the risk of HIV/AIDS transmission by approximately 85–99% relative to risk when unprotected. Condoms are rarely used for oral sex and there is significantly less research on behaviors with regard to condom use for anal and oral sex. The most effective way to avoid sexually transmitted infections is to abstain from sexual intercourse, especially vaginal, anal, and oral sexual intercourse.

Decisions and options concerning birth control can be affected by cultural reasons, such as religion, gender roles or folklore. In the predominantly Catholic countries Ireland, Italy, and the Philippines, fertility awareness and the rhythm method are emphasized while disapproval is expressed with regard to other contraceptive methods. Worldwide, sterilization is a more common birth control method, and use of the intrauterine device (IUD) is the most common and effective way of reversible contraception. Conception and contraception are additionally a life-and-death situation in developing countries, where one in three women give birth before age 20; however, 90% of unsafe abortions in these countries could be prevented by effective contraception use.

The National Survey of Sexual Health and Behavior (NSSHB) indicated in 2010 that "1 of 4 acts of vaginal intercourse are condom-protected in the U.S. (1 in 3 among singles)," that "condom use is higher among black and Hispanic Americans than among white Americans and those from other racial groups," and that "adults using a condom for intercourse were just as likely to rate the sexual extent positively in terms of arousal, pleasure and orgasm than when having intercourse without one".

=== Prevalence ===
Penile–vaginal penetration is the most common form of sexual intercourse. Studies indicate that most heterosexual couples engage in vaginal intercourse nearly every sexual encounter. The National Survey of Sexual Health and Behavior (NSSHB) reported in 2010 that vaginal intercourse is "the most prevalent sexual behavior among men and women of all ages and ethnicities". Clint E. Bruess et al. stated that it "is the most frequently studied behavior" and is "often the focus of sexuality education programming for youth." Weiten et al. said that it "is the most widely endorsed and practiced sexual act in our society."

Regarding oral or anal intercourse, the CDC stated in 2009, "Studies indicate that oral sex is commonly practiced by sexually active male-female and same-gender couples of various ages, including adolescents." Oral sex is significantly more common than anal sex. The 2010 NSSHB study reported that vaginal intercourse was practiced more than insertive anal intercourse among men, but that 13% to 15% of men aged 25 to 49 practiced insertive anal intercourse. Receptive anal intercourse was infrequent among men, with approximately 7% of men aged 14 to 94 years old having said that they were a receptive partner during anal intercourse. The study said that fewer women reported engaging in anal sex than other partnered sexual behaviors. It was estimated that 10% to 14% of women aged 18 to 39 years old practiced anal sex in the past 90 days, and that most of the women who engage in anal sex said they practiced it once a month or a few times a year.

==== Age at first intercourse ====
The prevalence of sexual intercourse has been compared cross-culturally. In 2003, Michael Bozon of the French Institut national d'études démographiques conducted a cross-cultural study titled "At what age do women and men have their first sexual intercourse?" In the first group of the contemporary cultures he studied, which included sub-Saharan Africa (listing Mali, Senegal and Ethiopia), the data indicated that the age of men at sexual initiation in these societies is at later ages than that of women, but is often extra-marital; the study considered the Indian subcontinent to also fall into this group, though data was only available from Nepal. In the second group, the data indicated families encouraged daughters to delay marriage, and to abstain from sexual activity before that time. However, sons are encouraged to gain experience with older women or prostitutes before marriage. Age of men at sexual initiation in these societies is at lower ages than that of women; this group includes south European and Latin cultures (Portugal, Greece and Romania are noted) and such from Latin America (Brazil, Chile, and the Dominican Republic). The study considered many Asian societies to also fall into this group, although matching data was only available from Thailand. In the third group, age of men and women at sexual initiation was more closely matched; there were two sub-groups, however. In non-Latin, Catholic countries (Poland and Lithuania are mentioned), age at sexual initiation was higher, suggesting later marriage and reciprocal valuing of male and female virginity. The same pattern of late marriage and reciprocal valuing of virginity was reflected in Singapore and Sri Lanka. The study considered China and Vietnam to also fall into this group, though data were not available. In northern and eastern European countries, age at sexual initiation was lower, with both men and women involved in sexual intercourse before any union formation; the study listed Switzerland, Germany and the Czech Republic as members of this group.

Concerning United States data, tabulations by the National Center for Health Statistics report that the age of first sexual intercourse was 17.1 years for both males and females in 2010. The CDC stated that 45.5 percent of girls and 45.7 percent of boys had engaged in sexual activity by 19 in 2002; in 2011, reporting their research from 2006 to 2010, they stated that 43% of American unmarried teenage girls and 42% of American unmarried teenage boys have ever engaged in sexual intercourse.

== Health effects ==
=== Benefits ===
In humans, sexual intercourse and sexual activity in general have been reported as having health benefits as varied as increased immunity by increasing the body's production of antibodies and subsequent lower blood pressure, and decreased risk of prostate cancer. Sexual intimacy and orgasms increase levels of the hormone oxytocin (also known as "the love hormone"), which can help people bond and build trust. Oxytocin is believed to have a more significant impact on women than on men, which may be why women associate sexual attraction or sexual activity with romance and love more than men do. A long-term study of 3,500 people between ages 18 and 102 by clinical neuropsychologist David Weeks indicated that, based on impartial ratings of the subjects' photographs, sex on a regular basis is associated with people looking significantly chronologically younger; however, this does not imply causality.

Vaginal intercourse for the first time increases vaginal immune activity.

=== Risks ===
Sexually transmitted infections (STIs) are bacteria, viruses or parasites that are spread by sexual contact, especially vaginal, anal, or oral intercourse, or unprotected sex. Oral sex is less risky than vaginal or anal intercourse. In many cases STIs initially do not cause symptoms, increasing the risk of unknowingly passing the infection on to a sex partner or others.

There are 19 million new cases of sexually transmitted infections every year in the U.S., and, in 2005, the World Health Organization (WHO) estimated that 448 million people aged 15–49 were infected per year with curable STIs (such as syphilis, gonorrhea and chlamydia). Some STIs can cause a genital ulcer; even if they do not, they increase the risk of both acquiring and passing on HIV up to ten-fold. Hepatitis B can also be transmitted through sexual contact. Globally, there are about 257 million chronic carriers of hepatitis B. HIV is one of the world's leading infectious killers; in 2010, approximately 30 million people were estimated to have died because of it since the beginning of the epidemic. Of the 2.7 million new HIV infections estimated to occur worldwide in 2010, 1.9 million (70%) were in Africa. The World Health Organization also stated that the "estimated 1.2 million Africans who died of HIV-related illnesses in 2010 comprised 69% of the global total of 1.8 million deaths attributable to the epidemic." It is diagnosed by blood tests, and while no cure has been found, it can be controlled by management through antiretroviral drugs for the disease, and patients can enjoy healthy and productive lives.

In cases where infection is suspected, early medical intervention is highly beneficial in all cases. The CDC stated "the risk of HIV transmission from an infected partner through oral sex is much less than the risk of HIV transmission from anal or vaginal sex", but that "measuring the exact risk of HIV transmission as a result of oral sex is very difficult" and that this is "because most sexually active individuals practice oral sex in addition to other forms of sex, such as vaginal or anal sex, when transmission occurs, it is difficult to determine whether it occurred as a result of oral sex or other more risky sexual activities". They added that "several co-factors may increase the risk of HIV transmission through oral sex"; this includes ulcers, bleeding gums, genital sores, and the presence of other STIs.

In 2005, the World Health Organization estimated that 123 million women become pregnant worldwide each year, and around 87 million of those pregnancies or 70.7% are unintentional. Approximately 46 million pregnancies per year reportedly end in induced abortion. Approximately 6 million U.S. women become pregnant per year. Out of known pregnancies, two-thirds result in live births and roughly 25% in abortions; the remainder end in miscarriage. However, many more women become pregnant and miscarry without even realizing it, instead mistaking the miscarriage for an unusually heavy menstruation. The U.S. teenage pregnancy rate fell by 27 percent between 1990 and 2000, from 116.3 pregnancies per 1,000 girls aged 15–19 to 84.5. This data includes live births, abortions, and fetal losses. Almost 1 million American teenage women, 10% of all women aged 15–19 and 19% of those who report having had intercourse, become pregnant each year.

Sexual activity can increase the expression of a gene transcription factor called ΔFosB (delta FosB) in the brain's reward center; consequently excessively frequent engagement in sexual activity on a regular (daily) basis can lead to the overexpression of ΔFosB, inducing an addiction to sexual activity. Sexual addiction or hypersexuality is often considered an impulse control disorder or a behavioral addiction. It has been linked to atypical levels of dopamine, a neurotransmitter. This behavior is characterized by a fixation on sexual intercourse and disinhibition. It was proposed that this 'addictive behavior' be classified in DSM-5 as an impulsive–compulsive behavioral disorder. Addiction to sexual intercourse is thought to be genetically linked. Those having an addiction to sexual intercourse have a higher response to visual sexual cues in the brain. Those seeking treatment will typically see a physician for pharmacological management and therapy. One form of hypersexuality is Kleine–Levin syndrome. It is manifested by hypersomnia and hypersexuality and remains relatively rare.

Sexual activity can directly cause death, particularly due to coronary circulation complications, which is sometimes called coital death, coital sudden death or coital coronary. However, coital deaths are significantly rare. People, especially those who get little or no physical exercise, have a slightly increased risk of triggering a heart attack or sudden cardiac death when they engage in sexual intercourse or any vigorous physical exercise that is engaged in on a sporadic basis. Regular exercise reduces, but does not eliminate, the increased risk.

=== Duration and genital complications ===
Sexual intercourse, when involving a male participant, often ends when the male has ejaculated, and thus the partner might not have time to reach orgasm. In addition, premature ejaculation (PE) is common, and women often require a substantially longer duration of stimulation with a sexual partner than men do before reaching an orgasm. Scholars, such as Weiten et al., state that "many couples are locked into the idea that orgasms should be achieved only through intercourse [penile-vaginal sex]," that "the word foreplay suggests that any other form of sexual stimulation is merely preparation for the 'main event'" and that "because women reach orgasm through intercourse less consistently than men," they are likelier than men to fake an orgasm to satisfy their sexual partners.

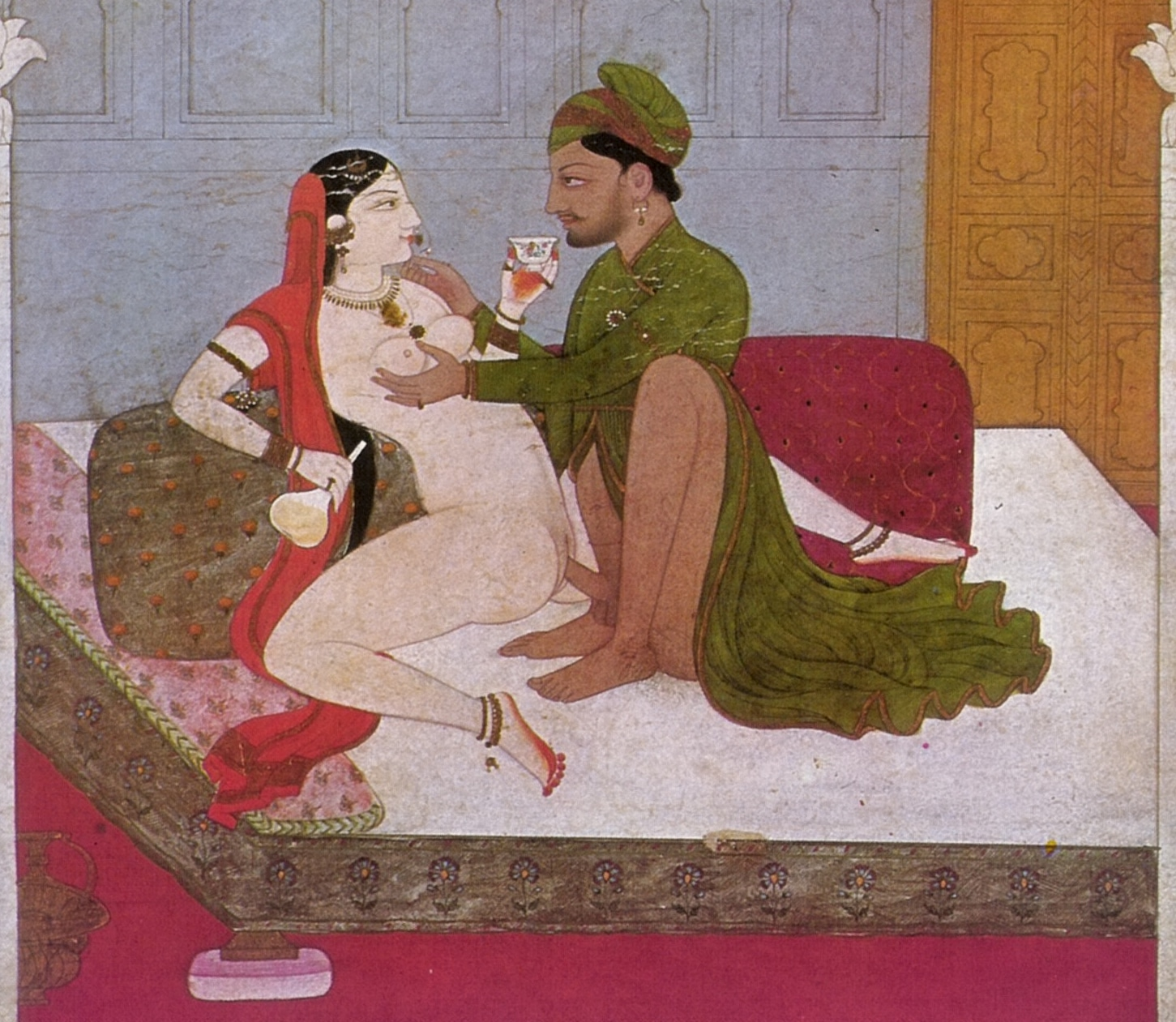
Painting of a couple (an Indian prince and lady) prolonging sexual intercourse

In 1991, scholars from the Kinsey Institute stated, "The truth is that the time between penetration and ejaculation varies not only from man to man, but from one time to the next for the same man." They added that the appropriate length for sexual intercourse is the length of time it takes for both partners to be mutually satisfied, emphasizing that Kinsey "found that 75 percent of men ejaculated within two minutes of penetration. But he didn't ask if the men or their partners considered two minutes mutually satisfying" and "more recent research reports slightly longer times for intercourse". A 2008 survey of Canadian and American sex therapists stated that the average time for heterosexual intercourse (coitus) was 7 minutes and that 1 to 2 minutes was too short, 3 to 7 minutes was adequate and 7 to 13 minutes desirable, while 10 to 30 minutes was too long.

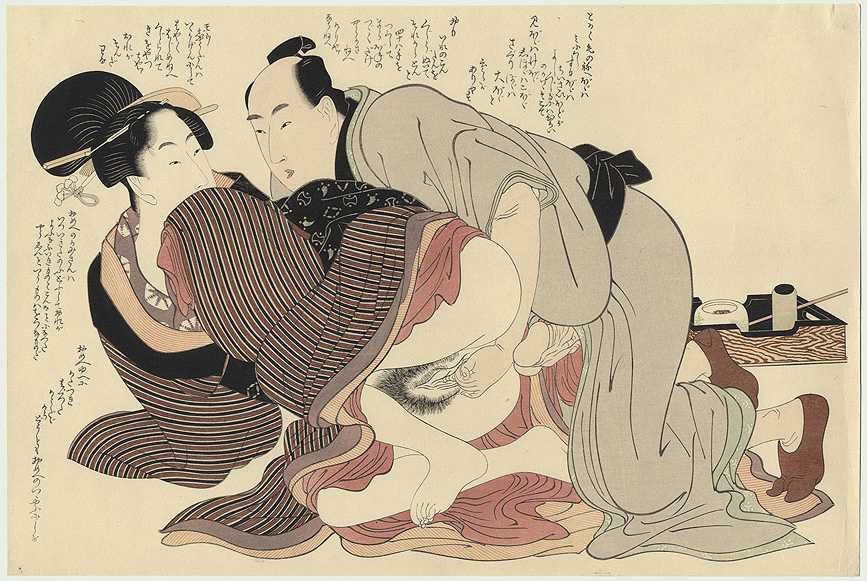
A woodblock print by Kitagawa Utamaro (1799), depicting a couple engaged in sexual intercourse

Anorgasmia is regular difficulty reaching orgasm after ample sexual stimulation, causing personal distress. This is significantly more common in women than in men, which has been attributed to the lack of sex education with regard to women's bodies, especially in sex-negative cultures, such as clitoral stimulation usually being key for women to orgasm. The physical structure of coitus favors penile stimulation over clitoral stimulation; the location of the clitoris then usually necessitates manual or oral stimulation in order for the woman to achieve orgasm. Approximately 25% of women report difficulties with orgasm, 10% of women have never had an orgasm, and 40% or 40–50% have either complained about sexual dissatisfaction or experienced difficulty becoming sexually aroused at some point in their lives.

Vaginismus is involuntary tensing of the pelvic floor musculature, making coitus, or any form of penetration of the vagina, distressing, painful and sometimes impossible for women. It is a conditioned reflex of the pubococcygeus muscle, and is sometimes referred to as the PC muscle. Vaginismus can be hard to overcome because if a woman expects to experience pain during sexual intercourse, this can cause a muscle spasm, which results in painful sexual intercourse. Treatment of vaginismus often includes both psychological and behavioral techniques, including the use of vaginal dilators. Additionally, the use of Botox as a medical treatment for vaginismus has been tested and administered. Painful or uncomfortable sexual intercourse may also be categorized as dyspareunia.

Approximately 40% of males reportedly have some form of erectile dysfunction (ED) or impotence, at least occasionally. Premature ejaculation has been reported to be more common than erectile dysfunction, although some estimates suggest otherwise. Due to various meanings of the disorder, estimates for the prevalence of premature ejaculation vary significantly more than for erectile dysfunction. For example, the Mayo Clinic states, "Estimates vary, but as many as 1 out of 3 men may be affected by [premature ejaculation] at some time." Further, "Masters and Johnson speculated that premature ejaculation is the most common sexual dysfunction, even though more men seek therapy for erectile difficulties" and that this is because "although an estimated 15 percent to 20 percent of men experience difficulty controlling rapid ejaculation, most do not consider it a problem requiring help, and many women have difficulty expressing their sexual needs". The American Urological Association (AUA) estimates that premature ejaculation could affect 21 percent of men in the United States.

For those whose impotence is caused by medical conditions, prescription drugs such as Viagra, Cialis, and Levitra are available. However, doctors caution against the unnecessary use of these drugs because they are accompanied by serious risks such as increased chance of heart attack. The selective serotonin reuptake inhibitor (SSRI) and antidepressant drug dapoxetine has been used to treat premature ejaculation. Another ejaculation-related disorder is delayed ejaculation, which can be caused as an unwanted side effect of antidepressant medications such as fluvoxamine; however, all SSRIs have ejaculation-delaying effects, and fluvoxamine has the least ejaculation-delaying effects.

Sexual intercourse often remains possible after major medical treatment of the reproductive organs and structures. This is especially true for women. Even after extensive gynecological surgical procedures (such as hysterectomy, oophorectomy, salpingectomy, dilation and curettage, hymenotomy, Bartholin gland surgery, abscess removal, vestibulectomy, labia minora reduction, cervical conization, surgical and radiological cancer treatments and chemotherapy), sexual intercourse can continue. Reconstructive surgery remains an option for women who have experienced benign and malignant conditions. Men and women who have undergone extensive surgery should consult their medical team to understand how their treatment or surgery affects sex and how long they should wait before having sexual intercourse after a surgery.

=== Disabilities and other complications ===
Obstacles that those with disabilities face with regard to engaging in sexual intercourse include pain, depression, fatigue, negative body image, stiffness, functional impairment, anxiety, reduced libido, hormonal imbalance, and drug treatment or side effects. Sexual functioning has been regularly identified as a neglected area of the quality of life in patients with rheumatoid arthritis. For those that must take opioids for pain control, sexual intercourse can become more difficult. Having a stroke can also largely impact on the ability to engage in sexual intercourse. Although disability-related pain, including as a result of cancer, and mobility impairment can hamper sexual intercourse, in many cases, the most significant impediments to sexual intercourse for individuals with a disability are psychological. In particular, people who have a disability can find sexual intercourse daunting due to issues involving their self-concept as a sexual being, or a partner's discomfort or perceived discomfort. Temporary difficulties can arise with alcohol and sex, as alcohol can initially increase interest through disinhibition but decrease capacity with greater intake; however, disinhibition can vary depending on the culture.

People with mental disabilities also are subject to challenges in participating in sexual intercourse. This can include the lack of a knowledgeable healthcare provider trained and experienced in counseling those with intellectual disabilities on sexual intercourse. Those with intellectual disabilities may have hesitations regarding the discussion of the topic of sex, a lack of sexual knowledge and limited opportunities for sex education. In addition there are other barriers such as a higher prevalence of sexual abuse and assault. These crimes often remain underreported. There remains a lack of "dialogue around this population's human right to consensual sexual expression, undertreatment of menstrual disorders, and legal and systemic barriers". Women with intellectual disability may lack sexual health care and sex education. They may not recognize sexual abuse. Consensual sexual intercourse is not always an option for some. Those with intellectual disability may have limited knowledge and access to contraception, screening for sexually transmitted infections and cervical cancer.

== Social effects ==
=== Adults ===
Sexual intercourse may be for reproductive, relational, or recreational purposes. It often plays a strong role in human bonding. In many societies, it is normal for couples to have sexual intercourse while using some method of birth control, sharing pleasure and strengthening their emotional bond through sexual activity even though they are deliberately avoiding pregnancy.

In humans and bonobos, the female undergoes relatively concealed ovulation so that male and female partners commonly do not know whether she is fertile at any given moment. One possible reason for this distinct biological feature may be formation of strong emotional bonds between sexual partners important for social interactions and, in the case of humans, long-term partnership rather than immediate sexual reproduction.

Sexual dissatisfaction due to the lack of sexual intercourse is associated with increased risk of divorce and relationship dissolution, especially for men. Some research, however, indicates that general dissatisfaction with marriage for men results if their wives flirted with, erotically kissed or became romantically or sexually involved with another man (infidelity), and that this is especially the case for men with a lower emotional and composite marital satisfaction. Other studies report that the lack of sexual intercourse does not significantly result in divorce, though it is commonly one of the various contributors to it. According to the 2010 National Survey of Sexual Health and Behavior (NSSHB), men whose most recent sexual encounter was with a relationship partner reported greater arousal, greater pleasure, fewer problems with erectile function, orgasm, and less pain during the event than men whose last sexual encounter was with a non-relationship partner.

For women, there is often a complaint about the lack of their spouses' sexual spontaneity. Decreased sexual activity among these women may be the result of their perceived failure to maintain ideal physical attractiveness or because their sexual partners' health issues have hindered sexual intercourse. Some women express that their most satisfying sexual experiences entail being connected to someone, rather than solely basing satisfaction on orgasm. With regard to divorce, women are more likely to divorce their spouses for a one-night stand or various infidelities if they are in less cooperative or high-conflict marriages.

Research additionally indicates that non-married couples who are cohabiting engage in sexual intercourse more often than married couples, and are more likely to participate in sexual activity outside of their sexual relationships; this may be due to the "honeymoon" effect (the newness or novelty of sexual intercourse with the partner), since sexual intercourse is usually practiced less the longer a couple is married, with couples engaging in sexual intercourse or other sexual activity once or twice a week, or approximately six to seven times a month. Sexuality in older age also affects the frequency of sexual intercourse, as older people generally engage in sexual intercourse less frequently than younger people do.

=== Adolescents ===
Adolescents commonly use sexual intercourse for relational and recreational purposes, which may negatively or positively impact their lives. For example, while teenage pregnancy may be welcomed in some cultures, it is also commonly disparaged, and research suggests that the earlier onset of puberty for children puts pressure on children and teenagers to act like adults before they are emotionally or cognitively ready. Some studies have concluded that engaging in sexual intercourse leaves adolescents, especially girls, with higher levels of stress and depression, and that girls may be likelier to engage in sexual risk (such as sexual intercourse without the use of a condom), but it may be that further research is needed in these areas. In some countries, such as the United States, sex education and abstinence-only sex education curricula are available to educate adolescents about sexual activity; these programs are controversial, as debate exists as to whether teaching children and adolescents about sexual intercourse or other sexual activity should only be left up to parents or other caregivers.

Some studies from the 1970s through 1990s suggested an association between self-esteem and sexual intercourse among adolescents, while other studies, from the 1980s and 1990s, reported that the research generally indicates little or no relationship between self-esteem and sexual activity among adolescents. By the 1990s, the evidence mostly supported the latter, and further research has supported little or no relationship between self-esteem and sexual activity among adolescents. Scholar Lisa Arai stated, "The idea that early sexual activity and pregnancy is linked to low self-esteem became fashionable in the latter half of the 20th century, particularly in the US," adding that, "Yet, in a systematic review of the relationship between self-esteem and teenagers' sexual behaviours, attitudes and intentions (which analyzed findings from 38 publications) 62% of behavioral findings and 72% of the attitudinal findings exhibited no statistically significant associations (Goodson et al, 2006)." Studies that do find a link suggest that non-virgin boys have higher self-esteem than virgin boys and that girls who have low self-esteem and poor self-image are more prone to risk-taking behaviors, such as unprotected sex and multiple sexual partners.

Psychiatrist Lynn Ponton wrote, "All adolescents have sex lives, whether they are sexually active with others, with themselves, or seemingly not at all", and that viewing adolescent sexuality as a potentially positive experience, rather than as something inherently dangerous, may help young people develop healthier patterns and make more positive choices regarding sexual activity. Researchers state that long-term romantic relationships allow adolescents to gain the skills necessary for high-quality relationships later in life. Overall, positive romantic relationships among adolescents can result in long-term benefits. High-quality romantic relationships are associated with higher commitment in early adulthood, and are positively associated with social competence.

== Ethical, religious, and legal views ==
=== General ===
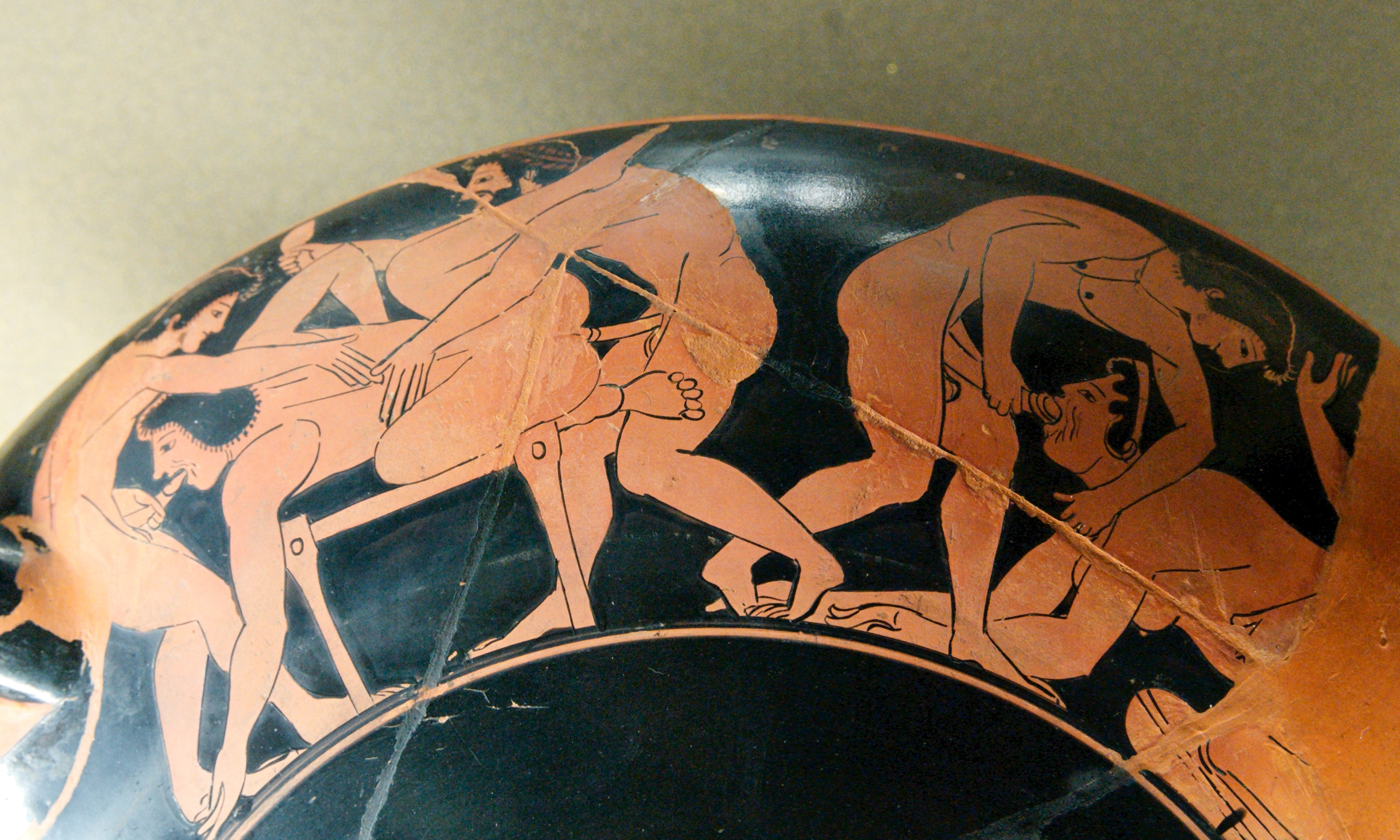
Erotic painting on ancient Greek kylix

While sexual intercourse, as coitus, is the natural mode of reproduction for the human species, humans have intricate moral and ethical guidelines which regulate the practice of sexual intercourse and vary according to religious and governmental laws. Some governments and religions also have strict designations of what they consider appropriate and inappropriate sexual behavior, which include restrictions on the types of sex acts which are permissible. A historically prohibited or regulated sex act is anal sex.

=== Sexual offenses ===
Sexual intercourse with a person against their will, or without their consent, is rape, but may also be called sexual assault; it is considered a serious crime in most countries. Studies and crime data from the United States have shown that more than 90% of rape victims are female, 99% of rapists male, and 4 to 5% of rapists are strangers to the victims.

Most countries have age of consent laws which set the minimum legal age with whom an older person may engage in sexual intercourse, usually set at 16 to 18, but ranges from 12 to 20, years of age. In some societies, an age of consent is set by non-statutory custom or tradition. Sex with a person under the age of consent, regardless of their stated consent, is often considered sexual assault or statutory rape depending on differences in ages of the participants. Some countries treat any sex with a person of diminished or insufficient mental capacity to give consent, regardless of age, as rape.

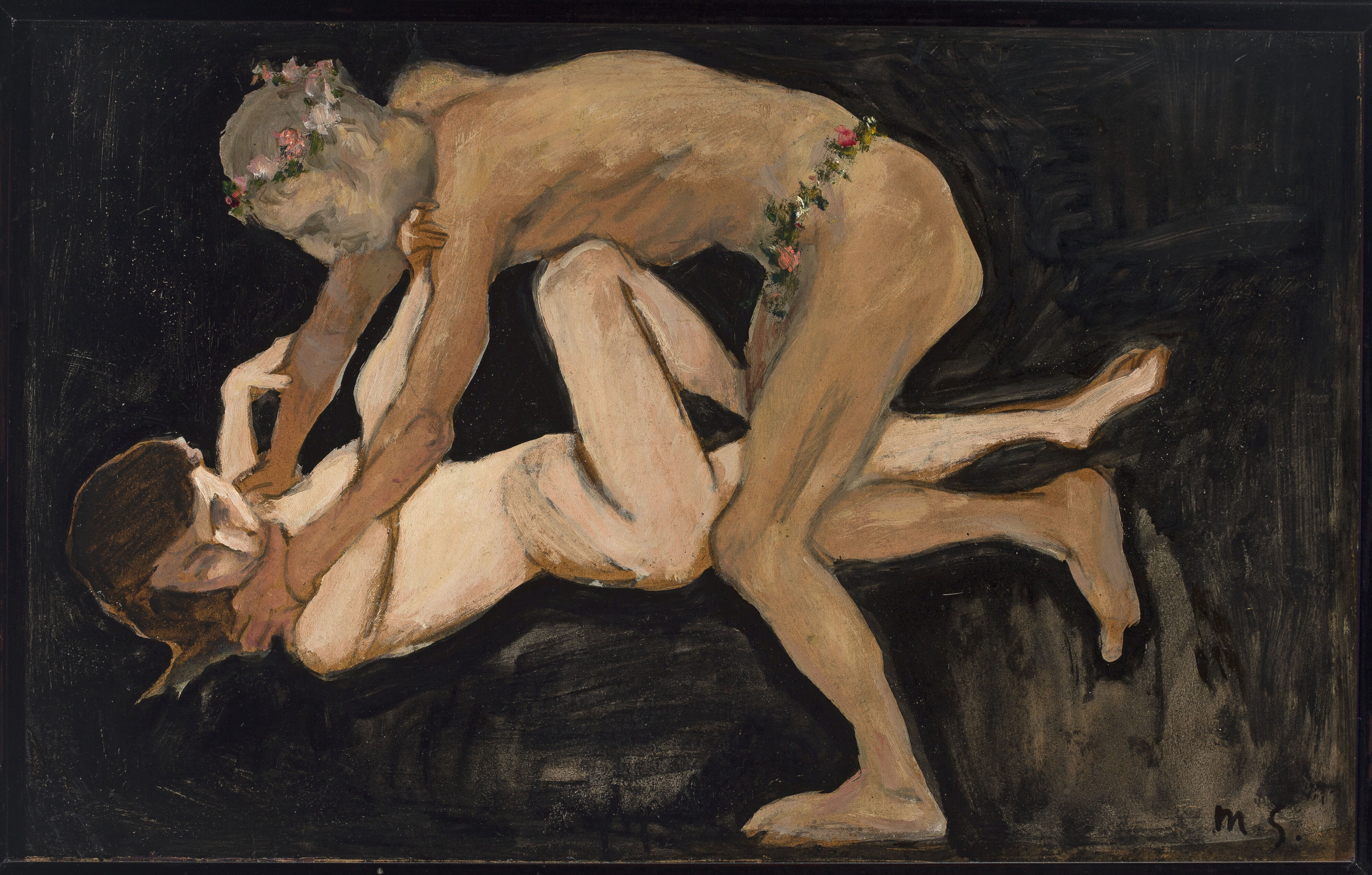
Max Slevogt depiction of rape

Robert Francoeur et al. stated that "prior to the 1970s, rape definitions of sex often included only penile-vaginal sexual intercourse." Authors Pamela J. Kalbfleisch and Michael J. Cody stated that this made it so that if "sex means penile-vaginal intercourse, then rape means forced penile-vaginal intercourse, and other sexual behaviors – such as fondling a person's genitals without her or his consent, forced oral sex, and same-sex coercion – are not considered rape"; they stated that "although some other forms of forced sexual contact are included within the legal category of sodomy (e.g., anal penetration and oral-genital contact), many unwanted sexual contacts have no legal grounding as rape in some states". Ken Plumber argued that the legal meaning "of rape in most countries is unlawful sexual intercourse which means the penis must penetrate the vagina" and that "other forms of sexual violence towards women such as forced oral sex or anal intercourse, or the insertion of other objects into the vagina, constitute the 'less serious' crime of sexual assault".

Over time, the meaning of rape broadened in some parts of the world to include many types of sexual penetration, including anal intercourse, fellatio, cunnilingus, and penetration of the genitals or rectum by an inanimate object. Until 2012, the Federal Bureau of Investigation (FBI) still considered rape a crime solely committed by men against women. In 2012, they changed the meaning from "The carnal knowledge of a female forcibly and against her will" to "The penetration, no matter how slight, of the vagina or anus with any body part or object, or oral penetration by a sex organ of another person, without the consent of the victim." The meaning does not change federal or state criminal codes or impact charging and prosecution on the federal, state or local level, but instead assures that rape will be more accurately reported nationwide. In some instances, penetration is not required for the act to be categorized as rape.

In most societies around the world, the concept of incest exists and is criminalized. James Roffee, a senior lecturer in criminology at Monash University, addressed potential harm associated with familial sexual activity, such as resulting children born with deficiencies. However, the law is more concerned with protecting the rights of people who are potentially subjected to such abuse. This is why familial sexual relationships are criminalized, even if all parties are consensual. There are laws prohibiting all kinds of sexual activity between relatives, not necessarily penetrative sex. These laws refer to grandparents, parents, children, siblings, aunts and uncles. There are differences between states in terms of the severity of punishments and what they consider to be a relative, including biological parents, step-parents, adoptive parents and half-siblings.

Another sexual matter concerning consent is zoophilia, which is a paraphilia involving sexual activity between human and non-human animals, or a fixation on such practice. Human sexual activity with non-human animals is not outlawed in some jurisdictions, but it is illegal in others under animal abuse laws or laws dealing with crimes against nature.

=== Romantic relationships ===
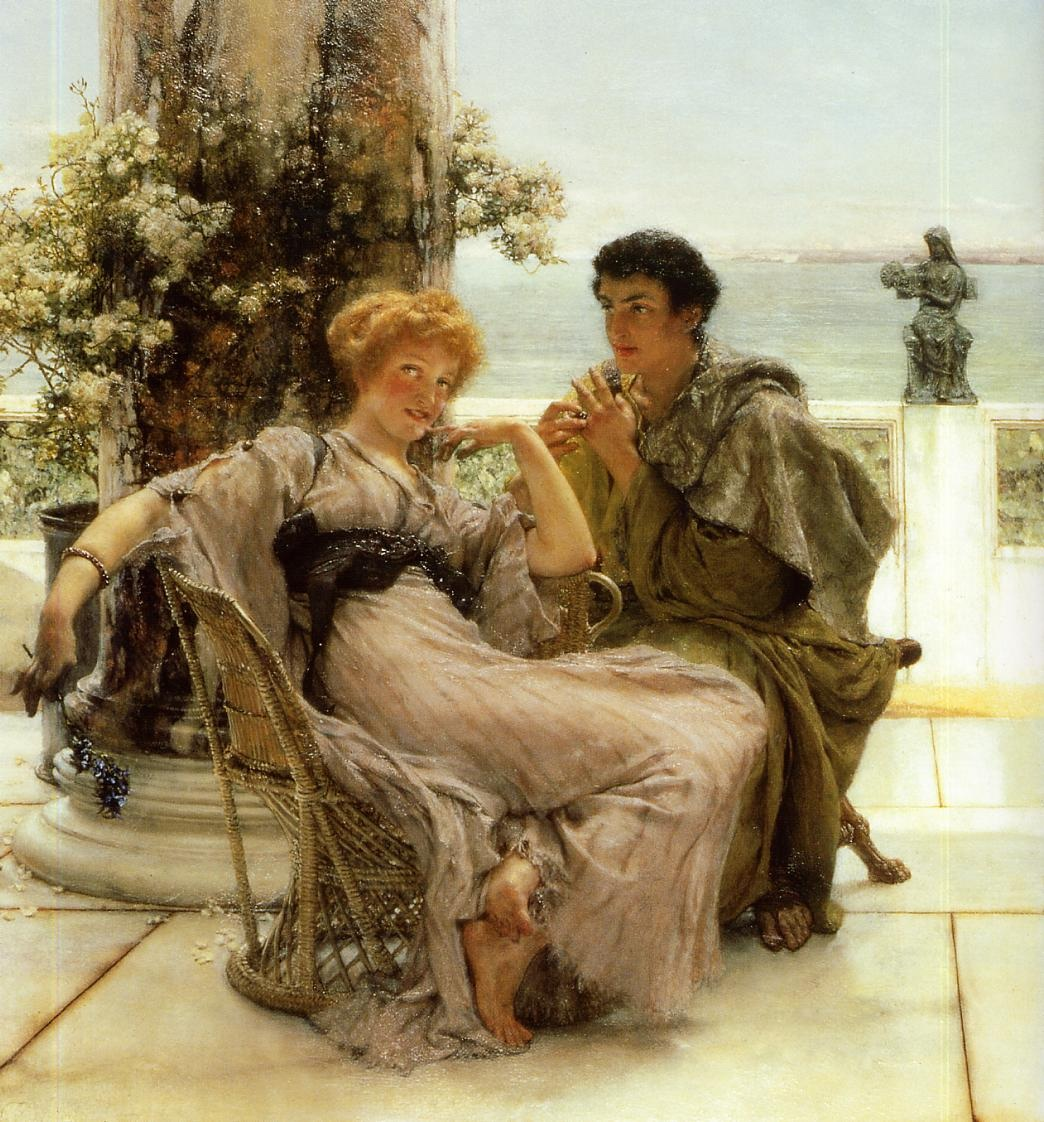
Lawrence Alma-Tadema depiction of courtship and a marriage proposal

==== Marriage and relationships ====
Sexual intercourse has traditionally been considered an essential part of a marriage, with many religious customs requiring consummation of the marriage and citing marriage as the most appropriate union for sexual reproduction (procreation). In such cases, a failure for any reason to consummate the marriage would be considered a ground for annulment (which does not require a divorce process). Sexual relations between marriage partners have been a "marital right" in various societies and religions, both historically and in modern times, especially with regard to a husband's rights to his wife. Until the late 20th century, there was usually a marital exemption in rape laws which precluded a husband from being prosecuted under the rape law for forced sex with his wife. Author Oshisanya, 'lai Oshitokunbo stated, "As the legal status of women has changed, the concept of a married man's or woman's marital right to sexual intercourse has become less widely held."

Adultery (engaging in sexual intercourse with someone other than one's spouse) has been, and remains, a criminal offense in some jurisdictions. Sexual intercourse between unmarried partners and cohabitation of an unmarried couple are also illegal in some jurisdictions. Conversely, in other countries, marriage is not required, socially or legally, in order to have sexual intercourse or to procreate (for example, the majority of births are outside of marriage in countries such as Iceland, Norway, Sweden, Denmark, Bulgaria, Estonia, Slovenia, France, Belgium).

With regard to divorce laws, the refusal to engage in sexual intercourse with one's spouse may give rise to a grounds for divorce, which may be listed under "grounds of abandonment". Concerning no-fault divorce jurisdictions, author James G. Dwyer stated that no-fault divorce laws "have made it much easier for a woman to exit a marital relationship, and wives have obtained greater control over their bodies while in a marriage" because of legislative and judicial changes regarding the concept of a marital exemption when a man rapes his wife.

There are various legal positions regarding the meaning and legality of sexual intercourse between persons of the same sex or gender. For example, in the 2003 New Hampshire Supreme Court case Blanchflower v. Blanchflower, it was held that female same-sex sexual relations, and same-sex sexual practices in general, did not constitute sexual intercourse, based on a 1961 entry in Webster's Third New International Dictionary that categorizes sexual intercourse as coitus; and thereby an accused wife in a divorce case was found not guilty of adultery. Some countries consider same-sex sexual behavior an offense punishable by imprisonment or execution; this is the case, for example, in Islamic countries, including LGBT issues in Iran.

Opposition to same-sex marriage is largely based on the belief that sexual intercourse and sexual orientation should be of a heterosexual nature. The recognition of such marriages is a civil rights, political, social, moral and religious issue in many nations, and the conflicts arise over whether same-sex couples should be allowed to enter into marriage, be required to use a different status (such as a civil union, which either grant equal rights as marriage or limited rights in comparison to marriage), or not have any such rights. A related issue is whether the word marriage should be applied.

==== Religious views ====
There are wide differences in religious views with regard to sexual intercourse in or outside of marriage:

- Most denominations of Christianity, including Catholicism, have strict views or rules on what sexual practices are and are not acceptable. Most Christian views on sexual intercourse are influenced by various interpretations of the Bible. Sexual intercourse outside of marriage, for example, is considered a sin in some churches; in such cases, sexual intercourse may be called a sacred covenant, holy, or a holy sacrament between husband and wife. Historically, Christian teachings often promoted celibacy, although today usually only certain members (for example, certain religious leaders) of some groups take a vow of celibacy, forsaking both marriage and any type of sexual or romantic activity. The Bible may be interpreted as endorsing penile-vaginal penetration as the only form of acceptable sexual activity, while other interpretations view the Bible as not being clear on oral sex or other particular sexual behaviors and that it is a personal decision as to whether oral sex is acceptable within marriage. Some sects consider the use of birth control to prevent sexual reproduction a grave sin against God and marriage, as they believe that the main purpose of marriage, or one of its primary purposes, is to produce children, while other sects do not hold such beliefs.
  - In the Roman Catholic Church, if a matrimonial celebration takes place (ratification), but the spouses have not yet engaged in intercourse (consummation), then the marriage is considered to be a marriage via ratum sed non consummatum. Such a marriage, regardless of the reason for non-consummation, can be dissolved by the pope.
  - In the Church of Jesus Christ of Latter-day Saints (LDS Church) sexual relations within the bonds of matrimony are seen as sacred. Latter-day Saints consider sexual relations to be ordained of God for the creation of children and for the expression of love between husband and wife. Members are discouraged from having any sexual relations before marriage, and from being unfaithful to their spouses after marriage.
  - Shakers believe that sexual intercourse is the root of all sin and that all people should therefore be celibate, including married couples. The original Shaker community that peaked at 6,000 full members in 1840 dwindled to three members by 2009.
- In Judaism, a married Jewish man is required to provide his wife with sexual pleasure called onah (literally, "her time"), which is one of the conditions he takes upon himself as part of the Jewish marriage contract, ketubah, that he gives her during the Jewish wedding ceremony. In Jewish views on marriage, sexual desire is not evil, but must be satisfied in the proper time, place and manner.
- Islam views sex within marriage as something pleasurable, a spiritual activity, and a duty. In Shia Islam, men are allowed to marry up to four wives at a time with whom they can engage in sexual activities, including intercourse. Shia women are allowed to enter only one marriage at a time, whether temporary or permanent.
- Hinduism has varied views about sexuality, but according to the Kama Sutra, sex is considered as a normal activity that is necessary for a fulfilling and happy life.
- Buddhist ethics, in its most general formulation, holds that one should neither be attached to nor crave sensual pleasure since it binds one to the cycle of birth and death, samsara, and prevents one attaining the goal of Nirvana. Since Buddhist monastics (i.e. bhikshus and bhikshunis) are to be fully dedicated towards this goal, they undertake the training rule of total abstinence from sexual intercourse, i.e. of celibacy. Other monastic training rules from the Code of Discipline (Patimokkha or Pratimoksasutra) and canonical Vinaya scriptures are to prevent masturbation, lustfully touching and speaking to members of the other sex, and other forms of sexual behaviour. Buddhist lay people undertake the Five Precepts, the third of which is avoiding sexual misconduct. Peter Harvey says that this precept "relates primarily to the avoidance of causing suffering by one's sexual behaviour. Adultery—'going with the wife of another'—is the most straightforward breach of this precept. The wrongness of this is seen as partly in terms of its being an expression of greed, and partly in terms of its harm to others. It is said that a man breaks the precept if he has intercourse with women who are engaged, or who are still protected by any relative, or young girls not protected by a relative, Clearly, rape and incest are breaches of the precept." The Buddhist Canonical scriptures contain no other regulations or recommendations for lay people—for example, with regard to homosexuality, masturbation, sexual practices and contraceptives. However, in keeping with the Buddhist ethical principles of not-harming and avoiding shame, guilt and remorse, socially taboo forms of sexuality as well as obsessive sexual activities can also be seen as being included in the third precept. Later Buddhist authors such as Nagarjuna give various clarifications and recommendations.
- In the Baháʼí Faith, sexual relationships are permitted only between a husband and wife.
- Unitarian Universalists, with an emphasis on strong interpersonal ethics, do not place boundaries on the occurrence of sexual intercourse among consenting adults.
- According to the Brahma Kumaris and Prajapita Brahma Kumaris religion, the power of lust is the root of all evil and worse than murder. Purity (celibacy) is promoted for peace and to prepare for life in forthcoming Heaven on earth for 2,500 years when children will be created by the power of the mind.
- Wiccans are told, as declared within the Charge of the Goddess, to "[l]et [the Goddess'] worship be within the heart that rejoiceth; for behold, all acts of love and pleasure are [the Goddess'] rituals." This statement appears to allow one freedom to explore sensuality and pleasure, and mixed with the final maxim within the Wiccan Rede—"26. Eight words the Wiccan Rede fulfill—an' it harm none, do what ye will."—Wiccans are encouraged to be responsible with their sexual encounters, in whatever variety they may occur.
- Meher Baba maintained that "In the beginning of married life the partners are drawn to each other by lust as well as love; but with conscious and deliberate cooperation they can gradually lessen the element of lust and increase the element of love. Through this process of sublimation, lust ultimately gives place to deep love."

In some cases, the sexual intercourse between two people is seen as contrary to religious law or doctrine. In many religious communities, including the Catholic Church and Mahayana Buddhists, religious leaders are expected to refrain from sexual intercourse in order to devote their full attention, energy, and loyalty to their religious duties.

== Other animals ==
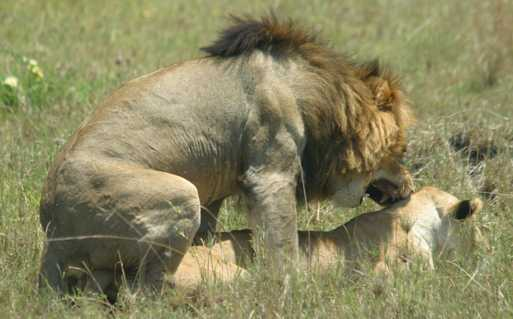
A pair of lions copulating in the Maasai Mara, Kenya

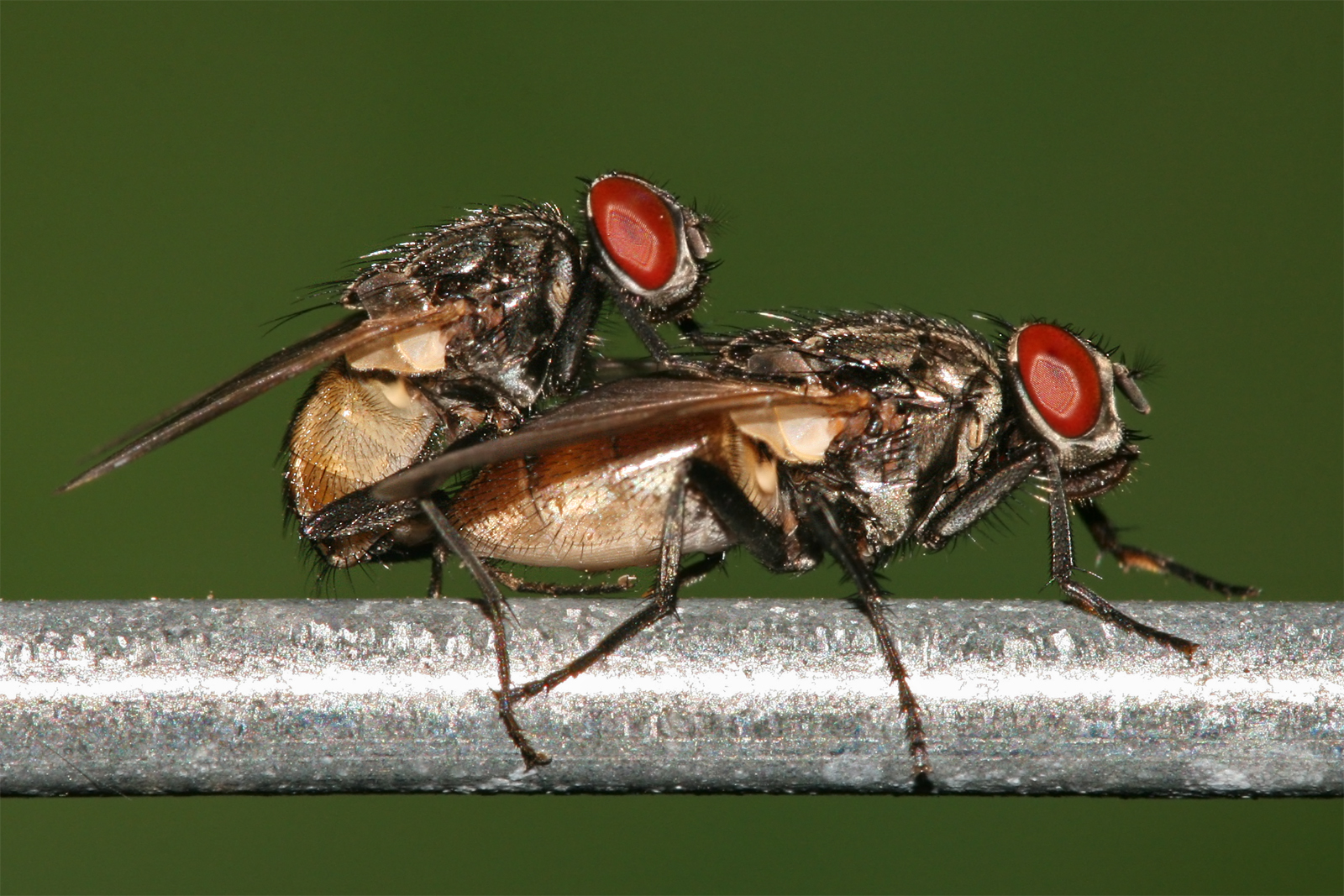
Mating houseflies

In zoology, copulation often means the process in which a male introduces sperm into the female's body, especially directly into her reproductive tract. Spiders have separate male and female sexes. Before mating and copulation, the male spider spins a small web and ejaculates on it. He then stores the sperm in reservoirs on his large pedipalps, from which he transfers sperm to the female's genitals. The females can store sperm indefinitely.

Many animals that live in water use external fertilization, whereas internal fertilization may have developed from a need to maintain gametes in a liquid medium in the Late Ordovician epoch. Internal fertilization with many vertebrates (such as reptiles, some fish, and most birds) occur via cloacal copulation (see also hemipenis), while mammals copulate vaginally, and many basal vertebrates reproduce sexually with external fertilization.

For primitive insects, the male deposits spermatozoa on the substrate, sometimes stored within a special structure; courtship involves inducing the female to take up the sperm package into her genital opening, but there is no actual copulation. In groups that have reproduction similar to spiders, such as dragonflies, males extrude sperm into secondary copulatory structures removed from their genital opening, which are then used to inseminate the female. In dragonflies, it is a set of modified sternites on the second abdominal segment. In advanced groups of insects, the male uses its aedeagus, a structure formed from the terminal segments of the abdomen, to deposit sperm directly (though sometimes in a capsule called a spermatophore) into the female's reproductive tract.

Bonobos, chimpanzees and dolphins are species known to engage in heterosexual behaviors even when the female is not in estrus, which is a point in her reproductive cycle suitable for successful impregnation. These species are also known to engage in same-sex sexual behaviors. In these animals, the use of sexual intercourse has evolved beyond reproduction to apparently serve additional social functions (such as bonding).

== See also ==
- Homosexual intercourse
- Human sexual response cycle – Four-stage model of physiological responses to sexual stimulation
