= Abecedarian Early Intervention Project =

Educational research project on early childhood intervention in the United States

- Location: Chapel Hill, North Carolina, United States
- Years active: 1972–1985 (long-term follow-up studies continue)
- Founded by: University of North Carolina at Chapel Hill
- Principal investigators: Craig Ramey; Frances Campbell
- Target group: Children from low-income and primarily African-American families
- Type: Early childhood education intervention; randomized controlled trial
- Intervention: Full-time, high-quality childcare and educational program from infancy through preschool
- Participants: 111 children (experiment and control groups)
- Outcomes studied: Cognitive development; educational attainment; employment; health
- Legacy: Influential study in education economics and early childhood policy; evidence cited in support of Head Start and similar interventions

The Carolina Abecedarian Project was a controlled experiment that was conducted in 1972 in North Carolina, United States, by the Frank Porter Graham Child Development Institute to study the potential benefits of early childhood education for poor children to enhance school readiness. It has been found that in their earliest school years, poor children lag behind others, suggesting they were ill-prepared for schooling. The Abecedarian project was inspired by the fact that few other early childhood programs could provide a sufficiently well-controlled environment to determine the effectiveness of early childhood training.

== Overview ==
This program assigned a random sample of 57 of 111 infants born between 1972 and 1977 to a full-time, high-quality educational intervention in a childcare setting from infancy through age 5 with the rest assigned to a control group. The children’s progress has been monitored over time with follow-up studies at ages 12, 15, 21, 30, and 35. The intervention consisted in part of educational games based on the latest in educational theory. An overwhelming majority (98 percent) of the children who participated in the experiment were African-American. The average starting age of participants was 4.4 months.

Whereas other childhood programs started at age two, the Abecedarian Project started from infancy and continued for five years, a period longer than most other programs. The participants received child care for 6–8 hours a day, five days a week. Educational activities were game-based and emphasized language. The control group was provided with nutritional supplements, social services, and health care to ensure that these factors did not affect the outcomes of the experiment. All the 111 infants were identified as "high risk" based on maternal education (which was on average 10th grade), family income, and other factors. The teacher-child ratio was low. It ranged from 1:3 for infants to 1:6 at age 5.

== Significant findings ==
Follow-up assessment of the participants involved in the project has been ongoing. So far, outcomes have been measured at ages 3, 4, 5, 6.5, 8, 12, 15, 21, and 30. The areas covered were cognitive functioning, academic skills, educational attainment, employment, parenthood, and social adjustment. The significant findings of the experiment were as follows:

Impact of child care/preschool on reading and math achievement, and cognitive ability, at age 21:

- An increase of 1.8 grade levels in reading achievement
- An increase of 1.3 grade levels in math achievement
- A modest increase in Full-Scale IQ (4.4 points), and in Verbal IQ (4.2 points).

Impact of child care/preschool on life outcomes at age 21:

- Completion of a half-year more of education
- Much higher percentage enrolled in school at age 21 (42 percent vs. 20 percent)
- Much higher percentage attended, or still attending, a 4-year college (36 percent vs. 14 percent)
- Much higher percentage engaged in skilled jobs (47 percent vs. 27 percent)
- Much lower percentage of teen-aged parents (26 percent vs. 45 percent)
- Reduction of criminal activity

Statistically significant outcomes at age 30:

- Four times more likely to have graduated from a four-year college (23 percent vs. 6 percent)
- More likely to have been employed consistently over the previous two years (74 percent vs. 53 percent)
- Five times less likely to have used public assistance in the previous seven years (4 percent vs. 20 percent)
- Delayed becoming parents by average of almost two years

Sparling and Meunier (2019) provide an update.

The project concluded that high quality, educational child care from early infancy was therefore of utmost importance.

Other, less intensive programs, notably the Head Start Program, but also others, have not been as successful. It may be that they provided too little too late compared with the Abecedarian program.

=== Neuro-physiological effects ===
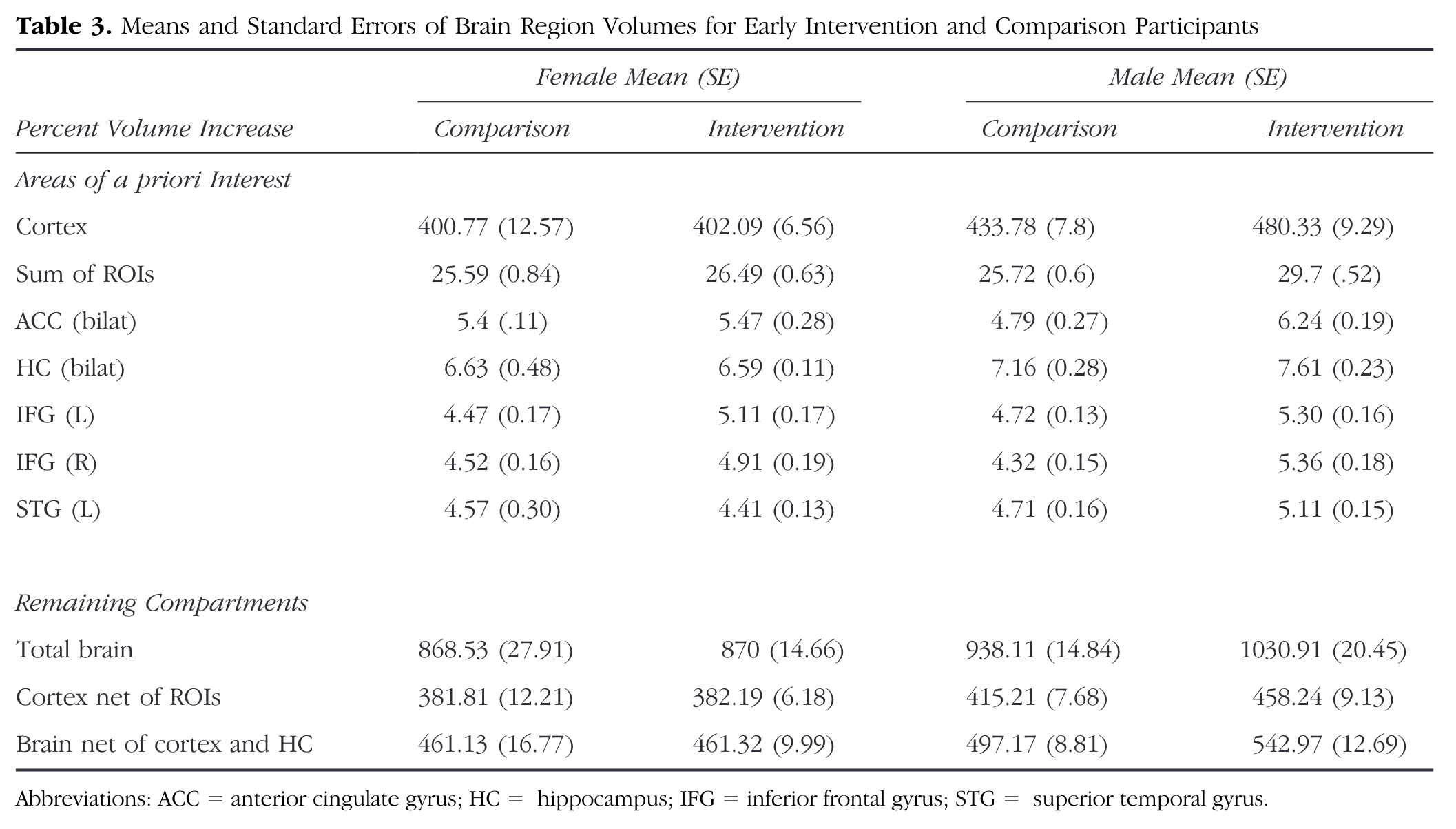
Adult brain volume differences due to the program

A 2021 study showed that the intervention resulted in significant changes in midlife brain structure in males. MRI scans showed that several brain region and total brain volumes were substantially larger in participants of the child care program than in the control group.

== Cost ==
The total per-child cost of the project was ~$67,225, or ~$13,900 for each of the five years (2002 dollars); Masse & Barnett 2002 estimated that the total annual cost of a comparable program for all poor children in 2002 would have been ~$3 billion.

== Criticisms ==
Some researchers have advised caution about the reported positive results of the project. Among other things, they have pointed out analytical discrepancies in published reports, including unexplained changes in sample sizes between different assessments and publications. Herman Spitz has noted that a mean cognitive ability difference of similar magnitude to the final difference between the intervention and control groups was apparent in cognitive tests already at age six months, indicating that "4 1/2 years of massive intervention ended with virtually no effect." Spitz has suggested that the IQ difference between the intervention and control groups may have been latently present from the outset due to faulty randomization. In fact, it is known that randomization was compromised in the Abecedarian program, with seven families assigned to the experimental group and one family assigned to the control group dropping out of the program after learning about their random assignment.

== See also ==
- HighScope
- Compensatory education

== Books ==
Campbell, Frances A., Craig T. Ramey, Elizabeth Pungello, Joseph Sparling, and Shari Miller-Johnson. "Early Childhood Education: Young Adult Outcomes From the Abecedarian Project," Applied Developmental Science, 2002, vol. 6, no. 1, pp. 42–57.

Leonard N. Masse and W. Steven Barnett, A Benefit-Cost Analysis of the Abecedarian Early Childhood Intervention, New Brunswick, N.J.: National Institute for Early Education Research, 2002. https://web.archive.org/web/20030315145225/http://nieer.org/resources/research/AbecedarianStudy.pdf

Campbell, Frances A., Elizabeth Pungello, Shari Miller-Johnson, Margaret Burchinal, and Craig T. Ramey. "The Development of Cognitive and Academic Abilities: Growth Curves From an Early Childhood Educational Experiment," Developmental Psychology, 2001, vol. 37, no. 2, pp. 231–242.

== Media ==
The research program has been featured in the TV program "My Brilliant Brain" sent by National Geographic Channel in 2007.
