= Universal preschool =

Government funded preschool education

Universal preschool is an international movement supporting the use of public funding to provide preschool education to all families. This movement is focused on promoting a global, rather than local, preschool program. The goal is to provide equity across all socioeconomic backgrounds, enabling children to improve their academic and social skills before they attend kindergarten. Universal preschool, funded by the public, would allow more families to send their children to preschool.

== Publicly funded preschool in the US ==
Nationwide and international research shows the short-term and long-term benefits of preschools are low for middle income families. The movement to advance publicly funded preschool has resulted in the successful passage of preschool legislation in 44 states in the United States of America. While some legislation for funding preschool has been passed on the federal level (including the Race to the Top Early Learning Challenge Grant) much of the advocacy still focuses on building broad support from diverse leaders in business, educators, child activists, philanthropists, law enforcement, and healthcare to lobby state legislatures.

According to an article by NPR, even though preschool programs and numbers have improved, the quality and enrollment percentages are still uneven between states. For example, as stated in the NPR article, "Washington, D.C. spends $15,748 per child. Mississippi spends less than $2,000 per child, roughly half of what states spend on average."; this portrays an example of the disparities ranging in the current preschool programs as well as why quality universal preschool should be a top priority.

While variations in implementation are numerous, state-funded pre-k consistently offer programs on a voluntary basis for children and families, unlike compulsory elementary, which is mandated by law with exceptions to allow for homeschooling and alternative education. Variations include how states deal with the following pre-k implementation elements:

- age of children eligible for the service of preschool (usually three-, four-, or five-year-olds, but sometimes only four-year-olds),
- wrap-around services, including whether special supports such as home visiting, and playgroups are provided to support children from at-risk families, full-day versus part-day pre-k, and whether programs should be offered year-round or only during the school year. The role of parents in paying for part of their child's pre-k tuition,
- quality requirements for state-funded programs, including requirements for teacher education and preparation, class size, student–teacher ratios, and the use of evidence-based curriculum, whether universal state-funded programs should be provided in the existing diverse delivery system for early childhood programs (including Head Start, public schools, non-profit and for-profit centers, programs hosted by churches that are non-religious, or in home settings such as regulated family day care).

Supporters of publicly funded preschool for all children cite research that shows:

- Because the brain is developing rapidly during the early years, stimulation from high quality preschool can support the development of neurologic pathways that serve a child in lifelong learning. Longitudinal studies (Abecedarian, Chicago Parent Child Centers, and the Perry Preschool Project) show significant long-term benefits for children who attend preschool, including improved health, social and behavioral outcomes, and well as higher income than the control group. Advocates for those in poverty cite research related to the achievement gap, where many at-risk children start out behind in school for a variety of reasons and never catch up. Pre-k programs help to eliminate this gap.
- Business organizations cite the need for pre-k to improve school-readiness and literacy by age nine in order to impact universal achievement of all children.
- Studies of high-quality preschool programs in North Carolina and Michigan have found that such programs could deliver a 7-to-1 return in the long run, in the form of increased productivity and decreased social spending. A University of Georgia study found that the pre-k students improved their school readiness scores relative to national norms. It also found that the pre-k system eliminated the skills gap between universal pre-K students and the more affluent students whose parents sent them to private programs. A Georgetown University study found gains in the children's cognitive and language assessment scores from the Oklahoma pre-k program—particularly among African-American and Hispanic children, whose scores improved by an average of 17 percent and 54 percent, respectively. As of 2006, 98 percent of Oklahoma school districts offer pre-k programs, up 30 percent since 1998.

== Economic advantages ==
A 2005 longitudinal study of 123 3 and 4-year-old black children conducted a cost-benefit analysis, reports that for every $1 invested in preschool education, there is a return on the investment of $12.90. Advantages of universal preschool for the child also include higher reading scores for low-income students. According to research from Dartmouth College, universal preschool programs boost low-income children's reading scores more than targeted preschool programs (e.g., Head Start), concluding that universal preschool is more productive than targeted preschool. Other research supports the Dartmouth College study's findings. Barnett and Frede's (2010) extensive research in early childhood education found that because students learn from each other, disadvantaged students learn more if their classmates are socioeconomically diverse. Additionally, a study out of Tulsa that compared Head Start and a state-funded (i.e., universal) preschool program found that the universal program is more effective in improving literacy outcomes and attentiveness.

== Policymaking considerations ==
As the topic of universal preschool gains momentum in the United States, policymakers will be involved in designing preschool programs. Many researchers are concerned that once state governments get involved, preschool programs will focus on academic skills rather than the comprehensive developmental needs of children. Because of the rich diversity in schools, researchers caution against using a 'one-size fits all' policy for developing universal preschool programs. Researchers recommend that policymakers consider the diverse perspectives of the primary stakeholders (i.e., children and educators) when developing policy for high-quality preschools. Research performed by Celia Genishi can aid policymakers in developing culturally responsive and developmentally appropriate high-quality preschool programs. Genishi's research considers the diverse classroom and students as the 'norm' and stresses the importance of the context of learning. Researchers suggest that policymakers examine a variety of research studies and create systems that are responsive to student diversity so that we can better serve all children.

== History ==
=== Europe ===
The universal preschool movement started in France with schools termed "école maternelle" in 1834. Various other European countries adopted some form of universal preschool, including Sweden.

=== United States ===
The movement gained ground in the United States as research showed that the high cost of high quality pre-K was beyond the ability of parents to pay, while the benefits from longitudinal studies showed societal benefits such as decreased crime, improved health, and greater earning capacity of children in later years.

These changes resulted from court decisions (Abbott v. Burke, New Jersey), constitutional amendment (Florida), and the dedication of lottery profits (Georgia). On June 6, 2006, California voters defeated an initiative for part day preschool for all four-year-olds as a constitutional right. The initiative proposed to include a tax on those in very wealthy income brackets. Those taxes were to be placed in a separate fund, and remain independent from the state budget. Illinois was the first state to offer voluntary preschool to all three- and four-year-olds. Preschool for All was signed into law in July 2006, after the bill passed the Illinois General Assembly. However, the program was unsuccessful at covering a majority of students, as by 2016 only 27% of Illinois four-year-olds and 19% of three-year-olds were enrolled. According to a 2005 study by the National Center for Education Statistics, children are more likely to attend a center-based care program located in its own building (38 percent) than a center-based care arrangement in any other location, including churches, synagogues and other places of worship (25 percent), public schools (17 percent), private schools (9 percent), community centers (3 percent), and any other facility (10 percent). In order to address funding for faith-based centers' universal pre-K, states such as Illinois have made these centers eligible for Preschool for All funding for the part of the day that does not include religious instruction.

Three states (Florida, Oklahoma, and Vermont) as well as the District of Columbia offer universal pre-kindergarten according to the definition by the Education Commission of the States (ECS); under this definition, all four-year-old residents of the state are eligible, all school districts are required to offer such programs, and sufficient funding is provided by the state. Eight additional states (Alabama, Georgia, Iowa, New Jersey, New Mexico, New York, West Virginia, and Wisconsin) offer "universal eligibility" programs according to the definition by the ECS; under this definition, all four-year-old residents of the state may or may not be eligible (New Jersey, for example, only requires the program in 31 high-poverty school districts), school districts can choose to offer such programs, and sufficient funding is provided by the state. California has a unique policy of "Transitional Kindergarten", which is offered to students who turn five between September 2 and December 2 to prepare the students for kindergarten the next year. Free preschool is also available for all children in Colorado for 15 hours a week, with some children qualifying for more.

== Opposition in the US ==
Assessment of program outcomes has been difficult, largely due to the lack of data and newness of universal pre-k around the nation. Studies in the US have not fully demonstrated the long-term benefit of pre-k to middle income children, although studies in Australia and New Zealand with comparable demographics have. Critics have charged that the costs of universal pre-k could rise. Since the term "universal" means access for all children, the cost varies in proportional to the expected contribution by parents in addition to state funding, the number of hours for which a state provide funding, and whether qualifying programs have enough slots for all children. Since quality requirements stipulate certain standards, not all pre-k programs, especially those in private settings, are eligible. There remains a controversy about whether private providers will be driven out of business if local public schools offer full-day, tuition-free programs.

Critics charge that where high quality publicly funded pre-k slots are limited, waiting lists can result in disadvantaged children competing with higher income children for preschool access. Some states provide an additional amount of tuition to help offset the special needs of at-risk children. Although no state mandates participation in programs, and even though some states provide funding for home-based pre-k programs, some conservatives argue that the responsibility for care and learning before kindergarten belongs solely to parents.

In some states, teachers unions are working with pre-k teachers to create early education unions, to allow for bargaining with state on pre-k reimbursements. At the same time, some teachers unions have opposed siting pre-k programs in private centers and homes, as a drain of public education resources and a potential open-door to school vouchers.
