= W. Steven Barnett =

U.S. American education economics

- Education: University of Michigan (Ph.D. in Economics)
- Known for: Economics of early childhood education Research on preschool programs including the Perry Preschool Program and the Abecedarian Project; State of Preschool reports
- Scientific career
- Fields: Education economics; Early childhood education; Preschool education
- Institutions: Rutgers University; National Institute for Early Education Research; Learning Policy Institute; National Education Policy Center; University of Chicago
- Website: NIEER profile

W. Steven Barnett is a U.S. American education economist who currently serves as a Board of Governors Professor at Rutgers University, where - being one of its founders - he also directs the National Institute for Early Education Research (NIEER). He is one of the world's leading scholars on early child development and the economics of pre-schools.

== Education ==
Steven Barnett earned his Ph.D. in economics from the University of Michigan. He is working at the Rutgers Graduate School of Education as a Board of Governors Professor and co-directs the National Institute for Early Education Research, which he has founded. In parallel, he also works as Senior Research Fellow at the Learning Policy Institute and the National Education Policy Center. He is also a member of the Human Capital and Economic Opportunity (HCEO) Global Working Group at the University of Chicago.

== Research ==
Steven Barnett's research focuses on the impact and economics of early care and education programmes, with a special focus on the Perry preschool and Abecedarian Early Intervention Project. With regard to the impact of the Perry Preschool Program, he finds that the net present value of the programme is positive due to increased earnings, reduced social welfare costs, delinquency and crime costs, and childcare costs, and that its benefits to taxpayers increased its cost. 20 years later, Barnett has been able to confirm the maintenance of these effects, confirming that preschooling strongly increased the lifetime earnings and decreased the criminal activity of recipients, yielding enormously positive social and private returns on investment (e.g. benefits to the general public, assuming a 3% discount rate, already amount to $12.90 per dollar invested); the by far largest share of the programme's social gain accrues due to the reduction in male crime rates (with Milagros Nores, Clive R. Belfield and Lawrence Schweinhart). Overall, Barnett and Belfield highlight the potential of increased preschool investments for the improvement of social mobility, though they emphasize that the potential is strongly tied to the quality of preschool programmes, including highly qualified teachers and small group sizes in preschool.

== Selected publications ==
- Barnett, W.S. (1995). Lifetime effects - the High/Scope Perry Preschool study through age 40. The Future of Children
- Diamond, A. et al. (2007). Preschool program improves cognitive control. Science, 318(5855), pp. 1387.
- Barnett, W.S. et al. (2010). The state of preschool 2010.
- Camilli, G. et al. (2010). Meta-analysis of the effects of early education interventions on cognitive and social development. Teachers College Record, 112(3), pp. 579–620.
- Belfield, C.R. et al. (2006). The High/Scope Perry Preschool Program: Cost-benefit analysis using data from the age-40 follow-up. Journal of Human Resources, 41(1), pp. 162–190.
- Barnett, W.S. et al. (2008). Educational effects of the Tools of the Mind curriculum - A randomized trial. Early Childhood Research Quarterly, 23(3), pp. 299–313.
- Barnett, W.S. (2011). Effectiveness of early educational intervention. Science 333(6045), pp. 975–978.
- Barnett, W.S., Masse, L.N. (2007). Comparative benefit-cost analysis of the Abecedarian Program and its policy implications. Economics of Education Review 26(1), pp. 113–125.
- Barnett, W.S. (2003). Better Teachers, Better Preschools - Student Achievement Linked to Teacher Qualifications. NIER Preschool Policy Matters, No. 2.
- Barnett, W.S. (2008). Preschool education and its lasting effects: Research and policy implications.
- Nores, M., Barnett, W.S. (2010). Benefits of early childhood interventions across the world: (Under)Investing in the very young. Economics of Education Review, 29(2), pp. 271–282.
- Barnett, W.S. (1992). Benefits of compensatory preschool education. Journal of Human Resources, pp. 279–312.
- Pianta, R.C. et al. (2009). The effects of preschool education: What we know, how public policy is or is not aligned with the evidence base, and what we need to know. Psychological Science in the Public Interest, 10(2), pp. 49–88.
- Wong, V.C. et al. (2008). An effectiveness-based evaluation of five state pre-kindergarten programs. Journal of Policy Analysis and Management, 27(1), pp. 122–154.
- Barnett, W.S. et al. (2007). Two-way and monolingual English immersion in preschool education: An experimental comparison. Early Childhood Research Quarterly, 22(3), pp. 277–293.
- Barnett, W.S. (1998). Long-term cognitive and academic effects of early childhood education on children in poverty. Preventive Medicine, 27(2), pp. 204–207.
- Barnett, W.S. (1993). Benefit-cost analysis of preschool education: Findings from a 25-year follow-up. American Journal of Orthopsychiatry, 63(4), pp. 500.
- Ackerman, D.J., Barnett, W.S. (2005). Prepared for Kindergarten: What Does "Readiness" Mean? NIEER.
- Barnett, W.S., Yarosz, D.J. (2004). Who goes to preschool and why does it matter? Preschool Policy Matters, No. 7.
- Barnett, Hustedt, J.T. (2005). Head Start's lasting benefits. Infants & Young Children, 18(1), pp. 16–24.
- Barnett, W.S., Boyce, G.C. (1995). Effects of children with Down syndrome on parents' activities. American Journal of Mental Retardation, 100(2), pp. 115–127.
- Yarosz, D.J., Barnett, W.S. (2001). Who reads to young children? Identifying predictors of family reading activities. Reading Psychology, 22(1), pp. 67–81.
