= New Hampshire House Bills 377 and 712 =

2025 law in New Hampshire, US

New Hampshire House Bill 377

New Hampshire General Court
- Long title: An act relative to health care professionals administering hormone treatments and puberty blockers and relative to recognizing the second Thursday in October as children's environmental health day.
- Territorial extent: New Hampshire
- Enacted by: New Hampshire House of Representatives
- Enacted by: New Hampshire Senate
- Signed by: Kelly Ayotte
- Signed: August 1, 2025
- Effective: January 1, 2026
- Introduced: January 8, 2025
- Voting summary: 202 voted for; 161 voted against; 19 absent

Revising chamber: New Hampshire Senate
- Received from the New Hampshire House of Representatives: March 27, 2025
- Third reading: June 5, 2025
- Voting summary: 16 voted for; 8 voted against

Final stages
- Finally passed both chambers: June 27, 2025

Summary
- Prohibits New Hampshirites under eighteen years of age from receiving gender-affirming medical care, including hormone therapy and puberty blockers, and makes it a felony to provide such care to minors knowingly.
- Status: In force

New Hampshire House Bill 712

New Hampshire General Court
- Long title: Limiting breast surgeries for minors, relative to residential care and health facility licensing, and relative to the collection and reporting of abortion statistics by health care providers and medical facilities.
- Territorial extent: New Hampshire
- Enacted by: New Hampshire House of Representatives
- Enacted by: New Hampshire Senate
- Signed by: Kelly Ayotte
- Signed: August 1, 2025
- Effective: January 1, 2026
- Introduced: January 9, 2025
- Voting summary: 191 voted for; 163 voted against; 20 absent

Revising chamber: New Hampshire Senate
- Received from the New Hampshire House of Representatives: March 27, 2025
- Third reading: June 5, 2025
- Voting summary: 16 voted for; 7 voted against; 1 absent

Final stages
- Finally passed both chambers: June 27, 2025

Summary
- Prohibits New Hampshirites under eighteen years of age from receiving most gender-affirming surgeries, including ones that affect the breasts and facial features.
- Status: In force

New Hampshire House Bill 377 (HB 377) is a 2025 law in the state of New Hampshire that restricts access to gender-affirming medical care for minors, including gender-affirming hormone therapy and puberty blockers. House Bill 712 (HB 712) is a law signed into law alongside HB 377 by Governor Kelly Ayotte on August 1, 2025, and prohibits minors from receiving gender-affirming surgeries that affect the breasts as well as other related surgeries.

Following the passage of both bills, New Hampshire became the first state in New England to prohibit gender-affirming medical care for minors. Both bills were passed along party lines in both chambers of the New Hampshire General Court, with only two Democrats splitting to join Republicans in support of HB 377 in the House of Representatives and one in support of HB 712.

== History ==
Both bills were introduced by Republican state representative Lisa Mazur. They were passed in the New Hampshire House of Representatives in June 2025, with the New Hampshire Senate following in late June. Prior to the passage of HB 377 in the Senate, an amendment was added, introducing a grandfather clause that would allow those under eighteen already receiving gender-affirming care to continue that care.

== Provisions ==
House Bill 377 prohibits New Hampshirites under the age of eighteen from receiving gender-affirming medical care (more specifically, hormone replacement therapy and puberty blockers). It criminalizes the provision of such treatments to minors and medical professionals who knowingly provide such care would be charged with a class B felony. The law was scheduled to take effect on January 1, 2026, and includes a grandfather clause allowing minors already receiving gender-affirming care prior to the law taking effect to continue receiving that care afterwards.

House Bill 712 prohibits New Hampshirites under eighteen years of age from receiving most gender-affirming surgeries, including ones that affect the breasts and facial features. It is directly related to House Bill 619, a 2024 law that prohibits surgeries affecting the genitals for minors. The law provides exceptions if such surgeries are due to infection, injury, or other situations deemed medically necessary.

== Reactions ==
=== Support ===
After signing both House Bill 377 and 712, Governor Kelly Ayotte released a statement in defense of the bills, claiming that medical care such as gender-affirming care could affect children negatively. All Republicans in both the New Hampshire Senate and House voted in favor of both bills.

=== Opposition ===
The American Civil Liberties Union and GLAD Law released statements in opposition to the passage of both bills. With the exception of two Democratic state representatives, all Democrats in the New Hampshire Senate and House voted against House Bill 377, with one Democrat voting for House Bill 712.

== See also ==
- LGBTQ rights in New Hampshire
- Transgender health care
