= Blanchflower v. Blanchflower =

David Blanchflower v. Sian Blanchflower
- Supreme Court of New Hampshire

Argued July 16, 2003 Decided November 7, 2003
- Full case name: In the matter of David G. Blanchflower and Sian E. Blanchflower
- Citation(s): 834 A.2d 1010

Holding
- Adultery is defined as the "voluntary sexual intercourse between a married man and someone other than his wife or between a married woman and someone other than her husband." Sexual intercourse is defined as "sexual connection esp. between humans: Coitus, Copulation." Coitus is defined to require "insertion of the penis in the vagina". Adultery within the meaning of the statute designating adultery as a cause for divorce does not include homosexual sexual relationships

Court membership
- Chief Justice: David A. Brock
- Associate Justices: Joseph Nadeau; Linda Dalianis; James Duggan; John Broderick

Case opinions
- Majority: Nadeau, joined by Duggan, Dalianis
- Dissent: Brock, joined by Broderick

Laws applied
- New Hampshire Revised Statutes Annotated 458:7, II
- Overruled by
- In the Matter of Molly Blaisdell and Robert Blaisdell, No. 2020-0211 (2021), "to the extent that it limits the definition of 'adultery,' as that term is used in RSA 458:7, II, to sexual intercourse between persons of the opposite sex."

Blanchflower v. Blanchflower, 150 N.H. 226 (2003), is a landmark decision by the New Hampshire Supreme Court which ruled that sexual relations between two females, one of whom is married, does not constitute adultery because it is not technically sexual intercourse.

== Background ==
In 2003, David Blanchflower, a professor from Dartmouth College, filed for divorce from his wife on the grounds that she was having an adulterous affair with Ms. Robin Mayer of West Windsor, Vermont. As in most cases of divorce involving alleged adultery, the professor was seeking an "at fault" ruling against his wife. His wife admitted that she was having an affair with Mayer, but Mayer argued that the affair did not constitute adultery under New Hampshire law.

== Ruling ==
After a lower court initially sided with David Blanchflower, the New Hampshire Supreme Court ruled in favor of the two women, concluding that adultery must meet the definition of sexual intercourse under New Hampshire law. In the 3-2 ruling, the majority determined that sexual relations between two females cannot constitute sexual intercourse and, therefore, the affair was not adultery. The decision was based on the 1961 edition of Webster's Third New International Dictionary, which defines sexual intercourse as coitus (penile-vaginal sex).

== Reactions ==
Reactions to the ruling were mixed, with some gay-rights groups condemning the ruling for its failure to recognize sex between people of the same gender. Other gay rights groups viewed the ruling as a victory under the law for one lesbian couple after many years of discrimination. Gay & Lesbian Advocates & Defenders (GLAD), an LGBT legal rights advocacy group, stated: "Both the majority opinion and the dissent made clear that this case was not about the status of same-sex relationships in society or any formal recognition same-sex relationships receive, and the opinions were both, on the whole, respectful of same-sex intimacy."

== April 2021 ruling ==
In April 2021, in a case titled In the Matter of Molly Blaisdell and Robert Blaisdell, No. 2020-0211 (2021), the New Hampshire Supreme Court held that the state's definition of adultery, which includes only intercourse between a married person and another person of the opposite sex, must be expanded to include same-sex intercourse in light of the legal and societal shift surrounding same-sex marriage. In doing so, it overruled Blanchflower "to the extent that it limits the definition of 'adultery,' as that term is used in RSA 458:7, II, to sexual intercourse between persons of the opposite sex."

== See also ==
- Lawrence v. Texas
- LGBT rights in New Hampshire
