= Herman H. Spitz =

American psychologist (1925–2019)

- Born: March 2, 1925; Paterson, New Jersey, U.S.
- Died: February 11, 2019 (aged 93); Natick, Massachusetts, U.S.
- Education: Lafayette College, New York University
- Known for: Studies of intellectual disability
- Scientific career
- Fields: Psychometrics, intellectual disability
- Workplaces: Trenton State Hospital, E. R. Johnstone Training and Research Center

Herman Heinrich Spitz (March 2, 1925 – February 11, 2019) was an American psychologist known for evaluating intelligence among people with developmental disabilities. He retired in 1989 as the director of research at the E.R. Johnstone Training and Research Center in Bordentown, New Jersey, a state institution for adolescents and young adults with moderate to severe intellectual disabilities. He worked under Superintendent John M. Wall, who retired in 1990 after serving from August 1969.

Spitz studied concepts such as mental age, and the abilities of autistic savants. He co-authored a survey on efforts to raise intelligence among people with intellectual disabilities. He reported on programs like the Carolina Abecedarian Early Intervention Project, which advocated for the early education of poor children. Using the Wechsler Adult Intelligence Scale, he reported that the Flynn effect of significant intelligence quotient gains in a single generation in many nations applied only to those with average intelligence. He also analyzed Wechsler subtest results among test takers with intellectual disabilities to assess the hereditarian hypothesis for the general intelligence factor.

In 1994 he joined 51 others in signing on "Mainstream Science on Intelligence," an editorial written by Linda Gottfredson and published in the Wall Street Journal. This editorial declared the consensus of the signing scholars on the measurement and significance of intelligence following the publication of the book The Bell Curve.

Herman H. Spitz died in Natick, Massachusetts, on February 11, 2019, at the age of 93.

== Books ==
- The raising of intelligence : a selected history of attempts to raise retarded intelligence. Hillsdale, N.J.: L. Erlbaum Associates. 1986. ISBN 9780898598360. OCLC 13666567.
- Nonconscious movements : from mystical messages to facilitated communication. Mahwah, N.J.: Erlbaum. 1997. ISBN 9780805825633. OCLC 35360511.
