= David P. Weikart =

American psychologist

David P. Weikart (August 26, 1931 – December 9, 2003) was an American psychologist and founder of the HighScope Curriculum, an early childhood education program.

Weikart was born on August 26, 1931, in Youngstown, Ohio. His parents were Hubert and Catherine Weikart. One of four children, he had an older sister and two younger brothers. Weikart's parents were social workers and teachers with a deep commitment to helping others – a commitment their son embraced as his own. He attended public school in Youngstown, graduating from South High School in 1949. He enrolled in Oberlin College, Oberlin, Ohio, in the fall of 1949 and graduated in 1953 with a major in psychology and a minor in zoology. Throughout the college years, he worked at a YMCA camp in Rochester, New York, as a counselor and program director. In the fall of 1953 Weikart enlisted in the United States Marine Officer Training Corps and graduated as a lieutenant. He was honorably discharged in December 1955 after serving as a platoon commander in Korea and Japan.

During the spring of 1956, Weikart taught English and biology at Canfield High School in Canfield, Ohio, and also attended Youngstown University, taking courses in education. In the fall of 1956 he enrolled in a University of Michigan joint PhD program in Education and Psychology sponsored by the School of Education and Department of Psychology. At the University of Michigan, Weikart met his future wife, Phyllis Saxton, then a master's candidate in the Department of Health and Physical Education. They were married in the summer of 1957 in Shelton, Connecticut.

In the fall of 1957 Weikart began working part-time as a school psychologist for the Ypsilanti Public Schools in Ypsilanti, Michigan; he began full-time work there the following year. In 1962, Weikart collaborated with a committee of elementary education leaders (including Charles Eugene Beatty) to create the Perry Preschool Project. He and his colleagues designed this project to find the causes and cures of academic underperformance of students in Ypsilanti's poorest neighborhoods. The committee studied the teaching methods and curriculum choices for these students and zeroed in on creating a program for three- and four-year-olds to prepare them for success in elementary school and beyond. Weikart and his colleagues implemented this preschool program at Perry Elementary School in Ypsilanti. Perry Preschool's program focused on each child's intellectual maturation and supported the child's development through a process of active learning. The HighScope Perry Preschool Project was evaluated in a randomized controlled trial of 123 low-income children to examine the long-term effectiveness of the type of curriculum used in the Perry Preschool (now known as the HighScope Curriculum). The HighScope Preschool Study concluded that a high-quality program for young, at-risk children contributes positively to their school success and economic outcomes and decreases their teen pregnancy rate and involvement in criminal activity. In 1970, Weikart left the Ypsilanti Schools to establish the HighScope Educational Research Foundation to continue his work on the preschool approach that he and his colleagues developed during the Perry Preschool Project.

In addition, Weikart and his wife worked as staff in leadership positions at several summer camps until they founded HighScope Camp in 1963. The couple had four daughters, all born between 1959 and 1964. Juggling full-time work, summer camp activities, a new family, and work on his PhD, Weikart received his degree from the University of Michigan in 1966.

In 1991 Weikart received an honorary Doctor of Science degree from Oberlin College in recognition of his achievements. He died December 9, 2003, from leukemia.
