= Lisa Mazur =

American politician

Member of the New Hampshire House of Representatives from the Hillsborough 44th district
- Incumbent
- Assumed office December 7, 2022

Personal details
- Party: Republican

Lisa Mazur is an American politician. She serves as a Republican member for the Hillsborough 44th district of the New Hampshire House of Representatives. In 2025, she introduced New Hampshire House Bill 377, which restricts access to gender-affirming medical care for minors, including gender-affirming hormone therapy and puberty blockers.
