= Richard M. Lerner =

American developmental psychologist

- Born: Richard Martin Lerner; February 23, 1946 (age 80); Brooklyn, New York
- Education: Hunter College; City University of New York
- Spouse: Jacqueline Lerner
- Children: 3
- Awards: Ernest R. Hilgard Lifetime Achievement Award for Distinguished Career Contributions to General Psychology from the American Psychological Association (2015)
- Scientific career
- Fields: Developmental psychology
- Institutions: Tufts University
- Thesis: Body build stereotypes and self- identification in three age groups of males (1971)

Richard M. Lerner (born February 23, 1946) is professor of Human Development at Tufts University, occupying the Bergstrom Chair in Applied Developmental Science. Also at Tufts, he directs the Institute for Applied Research in Youth Development. He did his undergraduate work at Hunter College, graduating in 1966.

Lerner has authored more than 700 scholarly publications, including more than 80 authored or edited books, and was founding editor of the Journal of Research on Adolescence and of Applied Developmental Science, the latter of which he continues to edit.

Lerner's recent honors include:

American Psychological Association (Division 1) Ernest R. Hilgard Lifetime Achievement Award for Distinguished Career Contributions to General Psychology, 2015

American Psychological Association Gold Medal for Life Achievement in the Application of Psychology, 2014

American Psychological Associations (Division 7) Urie Bronfenbrenner Award for Lifetime Contribution to Developmental Psychology in the Service of Science and Society, 2013

John P. Hill Memorial Award for Life-Time Outstanding Work, the Society for Research on Adolescence, 2010

== Selected works ==
- Lerner, Richard M. Concepts and Theories of Human Development. 3rd ed. Mahwah, NJ: Erlbaum, 2002.
- Silbereisen, R. K. and Richard M. Lerner (eds.). Approaches to Positive Youth Development. Los Angeles: Sage, 2007.
- Damon, William and Richard M. Lerner. Child and Adolescent Development: An Advanced Course. Hoboken, NJ: Wiley, 2008.
- Lerner, Richard M.; Steinberg, Laurence, eds. (2009). Handbook of Adolescent Psychology. doi:10.1002/9780470479193. ISBN 9780470479193. S2CID 143274575.
- Freund, Alexandra M. (2010). Lerner, Richard M.; Lamb, Michael E.; Freund, Alexandra M. (eds.). The Handbook of Life-Span Development. doi:10.1002/9780470880166. ISBN 9780470390139.
- Lerner, Richard M.; Lerner, Jacqueline V.; Benson, Janette B. (2011). Positive Youth Development. Advances in Child Development and Behavior. Vol. 41. pp. 1–17. doi:10.1016/B978-0-12-386492-5.00001-4. ISBN 9780123864925. PMID 23259186.
- Molenaar, Peter C. M., Richard M. Lerner, and Karl M. Newell (eds.). Handbook of Developmental Systems Theory and Methodology. Guilford, 2014.
- Lerner, Richard M. and Willis F. Overton (eds.). Handbook of Child Psychology and Developmental Science. 4 vols. Hoboken, NJ: Wiley, 2015.
- Lerner, Richard M. (2016). Lerner, Richard M. (ed.). Cognitive and Moral Development, Academic Achievement in Adolescence. doi:10.4324/9780203775530. ISBN 9780203775530. S2CID 141725520.
