= Jacqueline Lerner =

American developmental psychologist

Jacqueline V. Lerner
- Born: Jacqueline Rose Verdirame; 1954 (age 71–72); Flushing, New York
- Education: St. John's University; Eastern Michigan University; Pennsylvania State University
- Spouse: Richard M. Lerner
- Children: 3
- Scientific career
- Fields: Psychology
- Institutions: Boston College
- Thesis: The role of congruence between temperament and school demands in school children's academic performance, personal adjustment, and social relations (1980)

Jacqueline V. Lerner (born 1954) is Professor of Applied Developmental & Educational Psychology in the Lynch School of Education and Human Development at Boston College, where she has taught since 1996. She is a member of the Society for Research in Child Development, the International Society for the Study of Behavioural Development, and Psi Chi. With her husband and research collaborator Richard M. Lerner, she has been active in promoting the concept of positive youth development.

== Personal life ==
Lerner was born Jacqueline Rose Verdirame in Flushing, New York, in 1954. She is married to Richard M. Lerner, who is also a psychologist; they live in Wayland, Massachusetts. They have three children and four grandchildren.
