= LGBTQ rights in New Hampshire =

- New Hampshire (USA)
- Legal status: Legal since 1975
- Gender identity: Altering sex on birth certificate and other documents allowed
- Discrimination protections: Sexual orientation and gender identity protections (see below)

Family rights
- Recognition of relationships: Same-sex marriage since 2010
- Adoption: Same-sex couples allowed to adopt

Lesbian, gay, bisexual, transgender, and queer (LGBTQ) people in the U.S. state of New Hampshire have seen a number of advances towards equal rights, with most advances in LGBT rights occurring in the state within the past two decades. Same-sex sexual activity is legal in New Hampshire, and the state began offering same-sex couples the option of forming a civil union on January 1, 2008. Civil unions offered most of the same protections as marriages with respect to state law, but not the federal benefits of marriage. Same-sex marriage in New Hampshire has been legally allowed since January 1, 2010, and one year later New Hampshire's civil unions expired, with all such unions converted to marriages. New Hampshire law has also protected against discrimination based on sexual orientation since 1998 and gender identity since 2018. Additionally, a conversion therapy ban on minors became effective in the state in January 2019. In effect since January 1, 2024, the archaic common-law "gay panic defence" was formally abolished; by legislation implemented within August 2023.

Effective from January 1, 2025 - sexual orientation is explicitly listed "within the expectation of privacy legislation" within New Hampshire.

In August 2025, laws were passed which eliminated access for transgender youth to receive gender-affirming care, even when deemed medically necessary by a physician. These bills went into effect January 2026, and remain in effect to this day. Following this and other major change in transgender protections, New Hampshire became regarded as the least safe New England state for transgender citizens.

== Law regarding same-sex sexual activity ==
Legislation against sodomy was repealed in June 1975 along with other reforms. The age of consent in New Hampshire is set at 16, regardless of sexual orientation or gender. The age of consent is 18 for relationships in which one party is under the care, guardianship or authority of the other. A 2003 New Hampshire Supreme Court ruling in Blanchflower v. Blanchflower found that adultery could not take place between two females.

== Recognition of same-sex relationships ==
Same-sex marriage in New Hampshire has been legal since January 1, 2010. Civil unions had previously been recognized.

=== Civil unions ===
Civil unions were only available to same-sex couples in New Hampshire. On April 4, 2007, the New Hampshire House with a vote of 243 to 129 passed a civil unions bill which would imbue partners in same-sex civil unions with the same "rights, responsibilities and obligations" as heterosexual couples in marriages. On April 26, 2007, the New Hampshire Senate approved the civil unions bill 14-10 along political party lines.

Governor John Lynch, who opposed same-sex marriage but indicated that he was receptive to discussing civil unions as a means of granting certain rights to same-sex couples, signed the bill into law on May 31, 2007, making New Hampshire "... the first state to embrace same-sex unions without a court order or the threat of one." The law took effect on January 1, 2008.

By mid-May 2008, over 300 same-sex couples had formed a New Hampshire civil union.

=== Same-sex marriage ===
Since January 1, 2010, New Hampshire has allowed same-sex couples to marry. The law previously set age minimums for participants in same-sex marriages different from those in opposite-sex marriage:

No male below the age of 14 years and no female below the age of 13 years shall be capable of contracting a valid marriage that is entered into by one male and one female, and all marriages contracted by such persons shall be null and void. No male below the age of 18 and no female below the age of 18 shall be capable of contracting a valid marriage between persons of the same gender, and all marriages contracted by such persons shall be null and void.

In May 2018, the New Hampshire General Court passed a bill to implement a clear minimum age of 16 with no exceptions. Originally, the bill had a minimum age of 18 for all couples, but it was reduced to 16 in committee. On June 18, 2018, Governor Chris Sununu signed the bill into law. The law went into effect on January 1, 2019.

=== Adultery ruling ===
In April 2021, the New Hampshire Supreme Court made a ruling to recognise same-sex adultery, because of a 2009 law that recognises same-sex marriage. This reversed a previous adultery ruling.

== Adoption and family planning ==
New Hampshire law allows a person, regardless of actual or perceived sexual orientation, to adopt. A law banning adoptions by gays and lesbians was repealed in 1999, allowing all single persons to adopt.

In 1987, a ruling by New Hampshire Supreme Court Justice David Souter stated that adoption laws are designed to give children one home "that is unified and stable." Judicial interpretations of this ruling and state laws initially varied from county to county, with some judges requiring adopting couples to be married. This resulted in inconsistency in the ability of same-sex couples, who could not legally marry, to adopt jointly. Once same-sex relationships obtained legal recognition in the state, all of New Hampshire's ten counties began allowing adoption by same-sex couples on the same terms as for opposite-sex couples.

New Hampshire law allows any woman to undergo donor insemination. The spouse of a pregnant woman is generally presumed to be the parent of her child. As a result, a child born to married lesbian parents will receive a birth certificate listing both women as the legal parents. State law permits surrogacy arrangements for same-sex couples intending to become parents and allows for the use of donated eggs in conjunction with surrogacy. Same-sex couples intending to become parents can receive a pre-birth order (PBO) directing that both their names be entered on the child's birth certificate when first issued.

=== 2020 adoption reforms ===
In August 2020, New Hampshire Governor Chris Sununu signed HB 1162, a law that similarly allows unmarried couples — both straight and gay — to adopt children, extends second-parent adoption to same-sex parents and mandates that a court judgment of parentage can be used to secure the parental relationships of children born through assisted reproduction.

== Discrimination protections ==
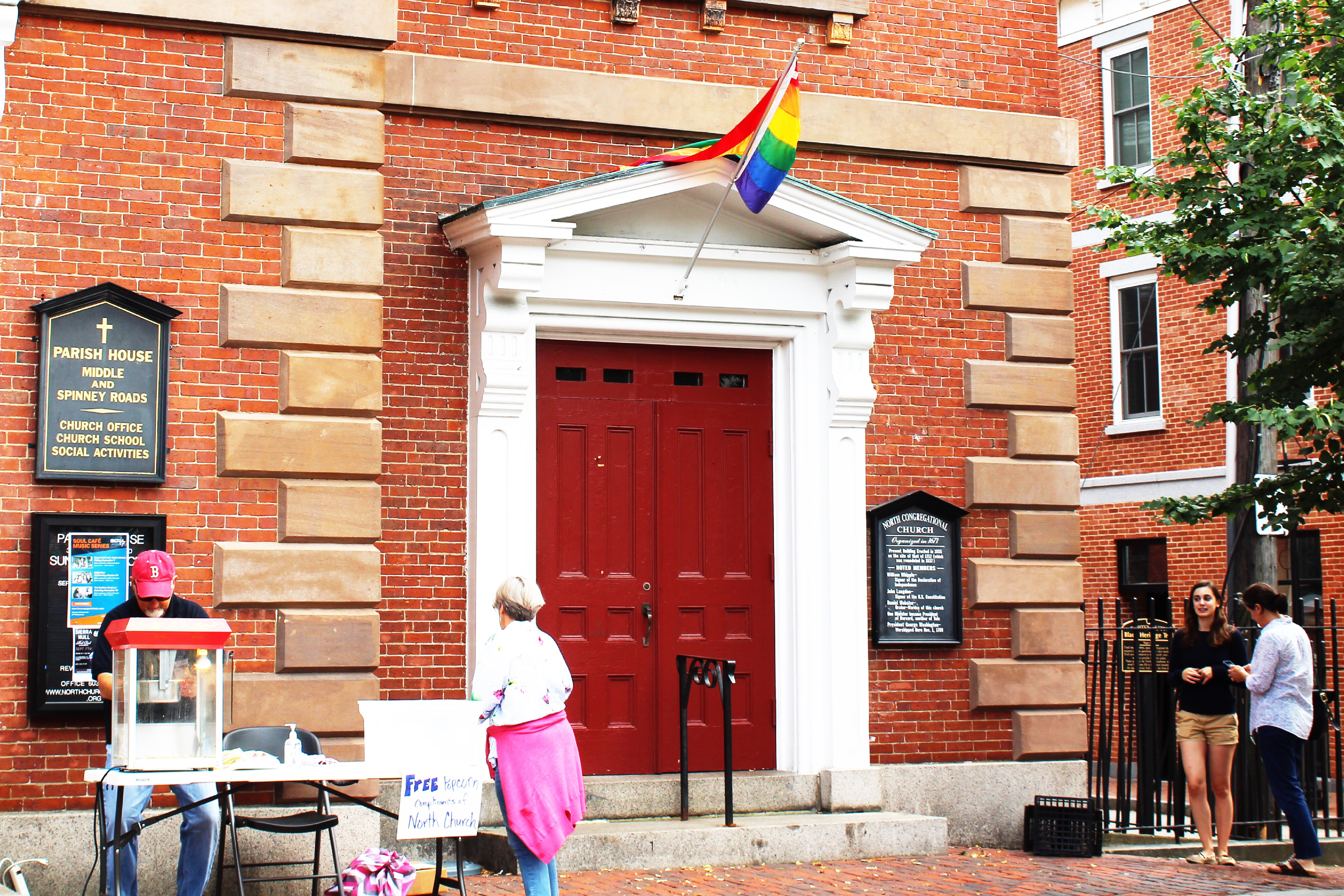
A rainbow flag outside the North Church in Portsmouth

Since July 2018, New Hampshire law has explicitly protected individuals from discrimination based on both sexual orientation and gender identity in public accommodations, housing and/or any private or public employment. Sexual orientation was included in the state's anti-discrimination law in 1998, but gender identity was not.

In 2009, a bill to add gender identity to the statute's categories passed the House on April 9 by a vote of 188–187, but was defeated in the Senate on April 29 by a vote of 24–0. On June 30, 2016, Governor Maggie Hassan issued an executive order to prohibit discrimination based on gender identity and gender expression in public employment, in access to state programs, and in state contracting. In May 2018, the New Hampshire General Court passed a bill (by a vote of 195–129 in the House and 14–10 in the Senate) to include gender identity in the state's anti-discrimination law, along with race, sex, age, marital status, religion, sexual orientation, etc. Governor Chris Sununu signed the bill into law on June 8, 2018, and it went into effect 30 days later. Prior to passage of the anti-discrimination law in 2018, discrimination on the basis of gender identity had already been banned in the jurisdictions of Durham, Derry, and Newmarket. The city of Portsmouth prohibited such discrimination in the public sector only (i.e. only concerning city employees).

On March 13, 2014, the New Hampshire Senate unanimously approved a constitutional amendment that would have prohibited discrimination on the basis of sexual orientation. Its adoption required approval by 3/5 of the House of Representatives and by 2/3 of voters in the November 2014 elections. However, it was never presented to the voters.

On March 7, 2019, the state House approved a bill to prohibit discrimination based on gender identity in public accommodations, health care and jury selection. It was approved by the Senate on May 30, with an amendment. On June 13, the House concurred with the amendment. The bill was signed into law by the Governor in August 2019 and went into effect on January 1, 2020.

On March 28, 2019, the state Senate approved a bill to prohibit discrimination based on sexual orientation and gender identity, amongst other categories, in all New Hampshire public schools. It was approved by the House on May 5, with an amendment, which was accepted by the Senate on June 13. The bill was signed into law by Governor Chris Sununu on 19 July, and went into effect 60 days later (i.e. September 17, 2019). Moreover, the state's anti-bullying law prohibits bullying on the basis of "race, color, religion, national origin, ancestry or ethnicity, sexual orientation, socio-economic status, age, physical, mental, emotional or learning disability, sex, gender identity and expression, obesity, or other distinguishing personal characteristics, or based on association with any person identified in any of the above categories." The law explicitly includes cyberbullying and harassment, and applies to all public schools and chartered public schools.

== Hate crime law ==
New Hampshire law has covered hate crimes based on sexual orientation since 1991 and gender identity since 2019. On March 7, 2019, the state House approved a bill to include gender identity in the law. It was approved by the Senate on May 30, with an amendment, which the Senate accepted on June 13. The bill was signed into law by the Governor in August 2019 and went into effect 60 days later (i.e. October 15, 2019).

The law provides for penalty enhancements if a crime was committed on the basis of the victim's perceived or actual sexual orientation or gender identity, among other categories.

=== Gay or trans common-law panic defence ===
Several bills for years failed to pass the New Hampshire Legislature to abolish the gay panic defence. Then in June 2023, a bill formally passed both houses of the New Hampshire Legislature by a conference committee - to remove and repeal the archaic gay and trans panic defence within common-law. The Governor of New Hampshire signed the bill formally into law. Effective from January 1, 2024.

== Transgender Rights ==
Sex reassignment surgery has been legal since 1990. Transgender persons in New Hampshire are allowed to change the gender marker on their birth certificate but require undergoing such surgery to do so. The applicant for a gender change must submit to the city or Town Clerk a birth certificate request form, a photograph, a certified court order indicating that the individual has had "a sex change" and must pay the applicable fees. In July 2019, Governor Chris Sununu vetoed a bill which would have removed some of these restrictions saying he believed the process was fine as is. Proponents of the bill responded that Sununu lacked understanding of the challenges the transgender community faced.

On October 20, 2017, New Hampshire lifted a ban on Medicaid health insurance coverage and state government funding for sex reassignment surgery.

In 2018, Governor Chris Sununu signed into law two bills intended to protect LGBT rights, one prohibiting discrimination based on gender identity in housing, employment, and public accommodations. In 2022, Sununu said he would veto a "parental bill of rights" that critics claimed would have forced schools to disclose students' gender identities to their parents. The bill died in the New Hampshire House of Representatives.

Since January 1, 2020, New Hampshire driver's licenses have included three sex options, that being "male", "female" and "X". The "X" option is not available for birth certificates. In August 2021, it was reported that the gender X on both New Hampshire drivers licences and I.Ds for individuals finally became legally available and implemented - after 2 years of delays of implementing the 2019 legislation and policy, due to the COVID-19 pandemic worldwide.

=== Youth Bans ===
On July 18, 2024, Sununu signed three bills limiting transgender rights. The first bill bans trans girls from girls sports in grades 5 to 12. The second bans gender-affirming medicine for minors and the third requires teachers to allow parents to opt their child out of instruction about "sexual orientation, gender, gender identity, or gender expression". At the same time, Sununu also vetoed a fourth bill that would have allowed businesses and government entities to discriminate against trans people, including adults.

In August 2024, the New Hampshire Supreme Court explicitly made a 3-1 ruling decision that legally protects and defends transgender individuals within schools and classrooms - on both “privacy and autonomy” grounds.

From January 1, 2025, sexual reassignment surgery has been banned for trans minors, retaining it for intersex people and male circumcisions

In August 2025, New Hampshire Governor Kelly Ayotte signed two controversial bills—House Bill 377 and House Bill 712—that ban most forms of gender-affirming medical care for minors, making New Hampshire the first New England state to enact such restrictions. HB 377 prohibits the use of puberty blockers and hormone therapy for individuals under 18 if used to affirm a gender identity different from their sex assigned at birth, while HB 712 restricts chest surgeries for minors except in cases involving injury, disease, or congenital conditions. The legislation includes a grandfather clause allowing minors already undergoing treatment as of January 1, 2026, to continue their care, but bars new patients. Medical professionals who violate the law may face disciplinary action, and individuals harmed by noncompliance can sue. Ayotte defended the bills as a bipartisan effort to "protect children," while LGBTQ+ advocacy groups, American Academy of Pediatrics and American Psychiatric Association condemned the laws as harmful government overreach into personal medical decisions. They argued that gender-affirming treatments can be vital to trans teens' mental health, helping them avoid the distress of going through puberty in a body that doesn't match their gender identity.

=== Sports Bans ===
On July 18, 2024, New Hampshire Governor Sununu signed three bills limiting transgender rights. The first bill bans trans girls from girls sports in grades 5 to 12. From August 19 that year, the ban on trans girls playing within female sports teams in up to grade 12 schools went into legal effect, requiring students to provide a birth certificate to qualify for sports on female teams.

In August 2024, a “temporary court stay” by a judge was granted in New Hampshire - regarding the implemented gendered policy sports legislation, pending “further investigation and other appeals” by courts.

== Conversion therapy ==
On March 23, 2016, the state House of Representatives approved a bill to prohibit the use of conversion therapy on LGBT minors, in a 229–99 vote. On May 12, the state Senate approved the bill with amendments, after initially voting to table it. The House rejected the Senate's amendments, and called for a conference committee. The conference committee did not reach an agreement on the text, and thus the bill died. Governor Maggie Hassan expressed disappointment that the bill did not reach her desk.

In April 2018, both the House and the Senate passed a bill that would ban conversion therapy on minors. Due to different versions, the House and the Senate convened in a conference committee. In May 2018, the bill was reported out of conference committee and was signed into law a month later by Governor Chris Sununu. The law went into effect on January 1, 2019.

In 2022, a bill (HB1077) within the New Hampshire General Court would attempt to repeal the ban on conversion therapy. The bill died in the House.

== Public opinion ==
A 2022 Public Religion Research Institute (PRRI) poll found that 82% of New Hampshire residents supported same-sex marriage, while 17% were opposed and 1% were unsure. The same poll also found that 88% of New Hampshire residents supported discrimination protections covering sexual orientation and gender identity. 11% were opposed.

== Summary table ==
Same-sex sexual activity legal	Yes (Since 1975)
Equal age of consent (16)	Yes (Since 1975)
Anti-discrimination laws for sexual orientation	Yes (Since 1998)
Anti-discrimination laws for gender identity	Yes (Since 2019)
LGBT anti-bullying law in schools	Yes
Hate crime law include sexual orientation and gender identity	Yes
Abolished the gay or trans common-law panic defence	Yes (Since 2024)
Same-sex marriages	Yes (Since 2010)
Equal marriageable age	Yes (Since 2019)
Recognition of same-sex couples (e.g. civil union)	Yes (Since 2008)
Both stepchild and joint adoption available for same-sex couples	Yes (Since 1999)
Right to change legal gender	Yes / (Since 1990, requires sex reassignment surgery - Effective from January 1, 2025 banned for children and minors explicitly)
Access to IVF for lesbians	Yes
Conversion therapy banned on minors	Yes (Since 2019)
Third gender option	Yes / (Since 2020; gender X available only on driver's licenses and I.Ds, not birth certificates)
Commercial surrogacy for gay male couples	Yes
MSMs allowed to donate blood	Yes (Since 2023, on the condition of being monogamous)

== See also ==
- Politics of New Hampshire
- LGBT rights in the United States
