= Sekolah High/Scope Indonesia =

Coordinates: 6°17′36″S 106°48′15″E

The main campus of Sekolah High Scope Indonesia in Jakarta, Indonesia

Sekolah HighScope Indonesia is a national-plus school based in Jakarta, Indonesia, established in 1996. The director is Antarina S.F. Amir. The school is based on the HighScope Research Foundation Development curriculum, of which the institute itself is located in Ypsilanti, Michigan. Sekolah HighScope Indonesia's first location is in Pondok Indah, South Jakarta. At first, the school only included the early childhood program, and during its first days of operation, HighScope Indonesia only had 8 students. A second campus is located on the Aston Jakarta hotel, located somewhere in Kuningan, South Jakarta. A third campus, now closed, had previously occupied a house that was only a walk away from Pondok Indah Mall. In 2000, HighScope Indonesia opened the Elementary program, which was previously located in a house in Cilandak, South Jakarta. They started with only one classroom, which doubled to three classrooms prior to moving to a new campus in Jl. TB Simatupang, West Cilandak, Jakarta Selatan, Daerah Khusus Ibukota Jakarta, in June 2002. In 2005, the Middle School program was opened, allowing 5th grade students to promote to 6th grade, without even having to leave the school. The latest was the High School program, located on the 5th floor on the second building of the campus.

== School Program & Curriculum ==
Compared to other schools in which classes are grouped according to their grades, Sekolah HighScope Indonesia uses the multiage system, in which classes are grouped according to the student's age. For example, a 6th grade class is mixed with 7th grade students, which ranges from students aged 11–14 years old, and 8th grade students mixed with 9th grade students, ages ranges from 13 to 16. Since 2003, the school has issued a dual language curriculum, which includes Indonesian and English languages.

Sekolah HighScope Indonesia issues a multi-lesson program, notably notified as the "Integrated Studies" program. The program alternates English and Indonesian as a provisional topical language. Students are required to make a report, a product, and a slide-show presentation used as a secondary presentation material.

== Other locations ==
Campuses inside Jakarta

- TB Simatupang, South Jakarta
- Kuningan, Central Jakarta
- Kelapa Gading, North Jakarta
- Alfa Indah, Joglo, Kembangan District, West Jakarta
- Pluit, North Jakarta

Outside Jakarta

- Bintaro, South Tangerang
- Medan, North Sumatra
- Bandung, West Java
- Bali
- Rancamaya, Bogor, West Java
- Palembang, South Sumatra
- Bekasi, West Java
