= E. R. Johnstone Training and Research Center =

Coordinates: 40°08′14″N 74°43′19″W

The E.R. Johnstone Training and Research Center was a residential school in Bordentown, Burlington County, New Jersey, United States, that trained adolescents and young adults with developmental disability with the goal of preparing its students to living in the community. Located adjacent, but separately, was the Juvenile Medium Security Center. Listed in the National Register of Historic Places, the Edward R. Johnstone Training and Research Center opened in 1955 after the state closed the New Jersey Manual Training and Industrial School for Colored Youth as a result of the 1954 decision in the US Supreme Court case of Brown v. Board of Education. It was posthumously named in honor of Edward R. Johnstone. The building housing the young women was damaged in a 1983 fire.

John M. Wall was the Superintendent from 1969 until his retirement in 1990. Dr. Joseph J. Parnicky was the Superintendent from 1958 to 1969.

Johnstone became the first large institution shut down by the state amid controversy over whether institutional residents could survive in a community setting. Follow-up quality of life information was collected about 225 former residents, and they were found to have fared better in group homes or supervised apartments than residents sent to other hospitals. Those who moved into community-based housing were more likely to get jobs, ride public transportation, go to restaurants and otherwise integrate into society. The study has been cited as an example of the benefits of deinstitutionalization. The validity of this study has been questioned for those residents who were placed in the community were done so due to their greater suitability to community living.
