= HighScope =

Early childhood education research project

HighScope Educational Research Foundation
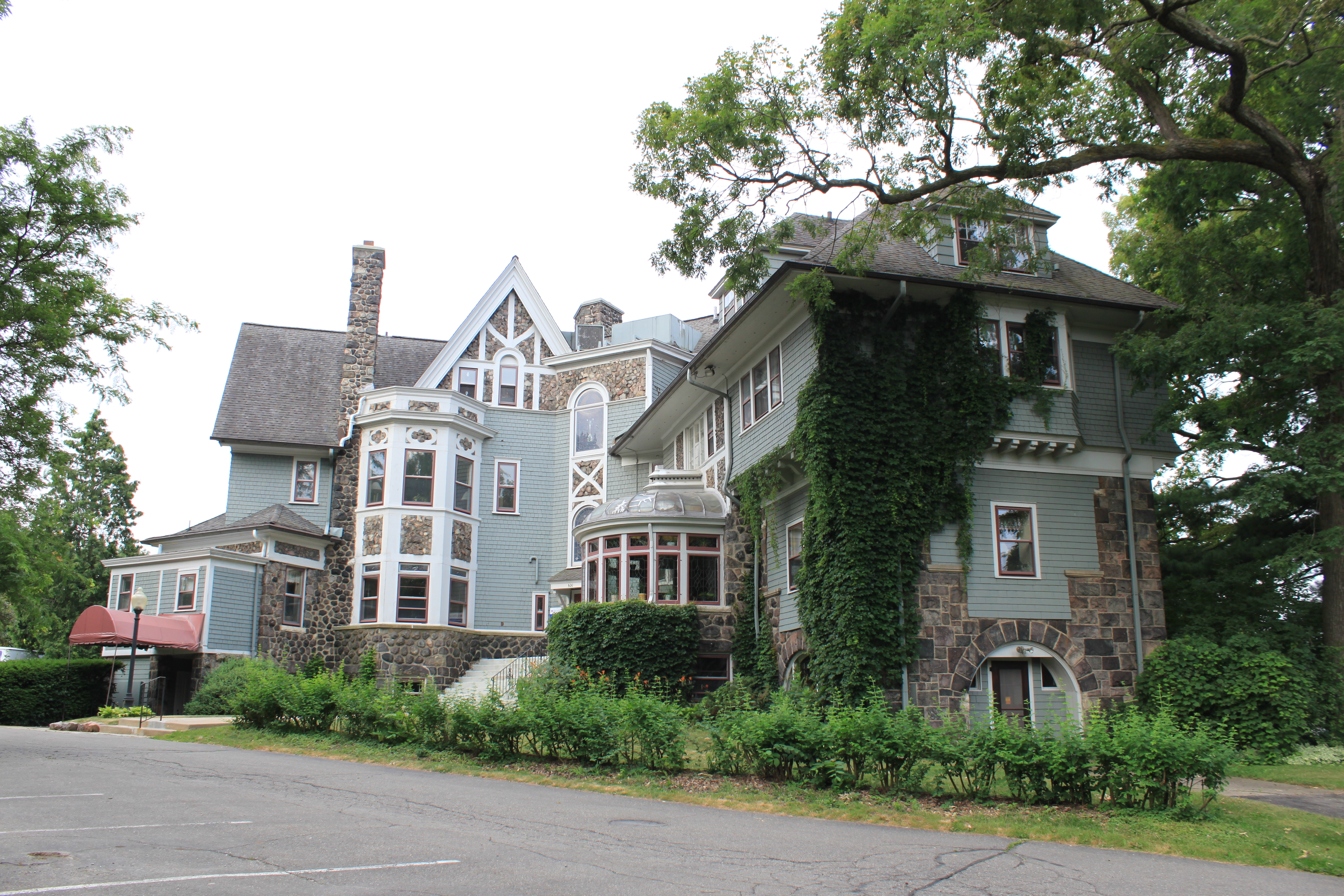
- HighScope's headquarters in Ypsilanti, Michigan
- Formation: 1970; 56 years ago
- Founder: David P. Weikart
- Headquarters: Ypsilanti, Michigan, U.S.
- Website: highscope.org

The HighScope Educational Research Foundation (known as HighScope or High/Scope) studies methods of early childhood education based on the methods of the 1962 Perry Preschool study. It was founded in 1970 by psychologist David P. Weikart.

The Perry Preschool study has been noted for its "large effects on educational attainment, income, criminal activity, and other important life outcomes, sustained well into adulthood".

The philosophy behind HighScope is based on child development theory and research, originally drawing on the work of Jean Piaget and John Dewey. The curriculum was further developed to incorporate Lev Vygotsky's zone of proximal development and Jerome Bruner's related strategy of adult scaffolding. This method emphasizes the role of adults to support each child at their current developmental level and help them build upon it under a model of "shared control," where activities are both child-initiated and adult-guided. The adults working with the children see themselves more as facilitators or partners, rather than as managers or supervisors.

== Original study ==
The original study was conducted from 1962-1967 in Ypsilanti, Michigan under the guidance of psychologist David Weikart and Perry Elementary School principal Charles Eugene Beatty. It was intended to boost the cognitive skills of 123 disadvantaged African American children with low IQs.

Families were randomly assigned to one of two groups: the intervention and a control group. For 2 years during the regular school year (39 weeks a year), 3-4 year old children would come to a classroom for 2 and a half hours a day. Students worked on projects where "they planned tasks, they executed tasks, and then they reviewed the tasks collectively." The intervention also included weekly visits by the teachers to the homes of the children for about 1.5 hours per visit to improve parent-child interactions at home.

=== Results ===
By the time children were 10, there wasn't much of a difference in how children in the two groups performed on tests of cognitive ability.

Because the study was conducted in the 1960s, researchers have been able to follow the children who went through the Perry Preschool Program through adulthood. Economist and Nobel laureate James Heckman has found that adults from the treatment group were "much more likely to graduate high school, much more likely to make earnings, much more likely to go on to college, much less likely to commit crime." At age 19, 67% of the preschool group graduated high school, compared to only 49% of the control group. 59% of the preschool group was employed, and 32% of the control group. Within the preschool group, 38% went to pursued higher education, while only 21% of the control group did. There was a 20 percentage point difference between the two groups in regards to having ever been detained or arrested (31% for the preschool group, 51% for the control).

Heckman also found multigenerational benefits of the program: children of participants in the program appear to have benefitted. According to Heckman, "We find some very strong effects. The children of the participants are healthier. The children of the participants are also earning more. They have better social and emotional skills, are more likely to graduate high school and go on to college, less likely to engage in the criminal justice system, so they're less likely to be incarcerated or even have ever been arrested."

=== Analysis ===
Heckman finds that the work with the parents was an important distinguishing component of the program, particularly because the parents stay in the children's lives beyond the program's 2-year duration. He also finds that the quality of the teachers (and consequently the expense of the program) was a critical component that allowed it to succeed in comparison with other, less expensive interventions.

Due to the results, the organization Social Projects that Work finds the study as a strong candidate for further research, but warns that the study was relatively small (128 subjects; 123 after dropouts).

==== Cost-effectiveness ====
James Heckman estimates that the Perry Project saved society $7 to $12 for every $1 invested, mostly due to reduced crime. HighScope itself reports that for every tax dollar invested in the early care and education program, $7 are saved for taxpayers by the time the participant is 27 years old, $13 are saved for tax payers by the time the participant is 40 years old, and that there is a $16 total return including increased income to the participants. See also Heckman, Moon, Pinto, Savelyev, & Yavitz (2010a, b).

== See also ==
- Abecedarian Early Intervention Project
- Compensatory Education
- Sekolah High/Scope Indonesia, an Indonesian national plus school that implements the HighScope Curriculum
- Head Start (program)
- Universal preschool
- Gisèle's Big Backyard, a children's television series modeled on the HighScope curriculum
