= Applied Developmental Science (journal) =

- Discipline: Developmental psychology
- Language: English
- Edited by: Edmond P. Bowers, G. John Geldhof

Publication details
- History: 1997–present
- Publisher: Taylor & Francis
- Frequency: Quarterly
- Impact factor: 3.479 (2020)

Standard abbreviations
- ISO 4: Appl. Dev. Sci.

Indexing
- CODEN: ADSCFM
- ISSN: 1088-8691 (print); 1532-480X (web)
- LCCN: 97640842
- OCLC no.: 34748647

Links
- Journal homepage; Online access; Online archive

Applied Developmental Science a is peer-reviewed academic journal on developmental psychology published by Taylor & Francis.

== Abstracting and indexing ==
The journal is abstracted or indexed in:

- Cabell's Directory of Publishing Opportunities in Psychology
- Child Development Abstracts & Bibliography
- CSA PAIS
- Current Contents/Social and Behavioral Sciences
- EBSCOhost
- Education Research Abstracts
- Intute Social Sciences Database
- Science Citation Index
- Social Sciences Citation Index
- ProQuest
- PsycINFO/Psychological Abstracts
- Sociological Abstracts
- Social Services Abstracts
- Social Planning/Policy & Development Abstracts

According to the Journal Citation Reports, the journal has a 2020 impact factor of 3.479 and a 5-year impact factor of 4.364, ranking it 22nd out of 78 journals in the category "Psychology, Developmental".
