= Juan Sánchez =

Juan Sánchez or Sanchez may refer to:

== Arts and entertainment ==
- Juan Sánchez Cotán (1560–1627), Spanish Baroque painter
- Juan Félix Sánchez (1900–1997), Andean folk artist
- Juan Sánchez Peláez (1922–2003), Venezuelan poet
- Juan Sanchez (artist), (born 1954), American painter
- Juan Ramón Sánchez (actor) (1957–2008), Spanish actor
- Juan Sánchez-Villalobos Ramírez, character from Highlander

== Politics and law ==
- Juan Sánchez Ramírez (1762–1811), Dominican soldier and politician (for whom Sánchez Ramírez Province is named)
- Juan Manuel Sánchez, Duke of Almodóvar del Río (1850–1906), Spanish noble and politician
- Juan Manuel Sánchez Gordillo (born 1952), Spanish politician
- Juan Ramon Sánchez (judge) (born 1955), U.S. federal judge

== Sports ==
=== Association football (soccer) ===
- Juan Ramón Sánchez (footballer) (born 1952), Salvadoran footballer and football manager
- Juan Carlos Sánchez (born 1956), Bolivian football striker
- Juan Sánchez (footballer, born 1972), Spanish footballer
- Juan Carlos Sánchez (footballer, born 1985) (born 1985), Bolivian footballer
- Juan Sánchez Sotelo (born 1987), Argentine footballer
- Juan Sánchez Miño (born 1990), Argentine footballer
- Juan Sánchez (soccer, born 1997), American soccer player
- Juan Sánchez (footballer, born 1998), Mexican footballer
- Juan Pablo Sánchez (born 2003), American soccer player

=== Other sports ===
- Juan Sánchez (baseball) (born 2007), baseball player
- Juan Sánchez (cyclist) (born 1938), Spanish Olympic cyclist
- Juan Manuel Sánchez (born 1962), Spanish sprint canoeist
- Juan Ignacio Sánchez (born 1977), Argentine basketball player
- Juan Carlos Sánchez Jr. (born 1991), Mexican boxer

== Others ==
- Juan Sánchez Duque de Estrada (1581–1641), Spanish bishop
- Juan Sánchez-Navarro y Peón (1913–2006), Mexican businessman, ideologue
- Juan Sánchez Muliterno (born 1948), Spanish professor
- Juan Sánchez Vidal (born 1958), Spanish model aircraft collector

== Other uses ==
- Juan Sánchez, Bayamón, Puerto Rico, a settlement in the Municipality of Bayamón, Puerto Rico
- Dr. Juan Sanchez Acevedo Coliseum, Puerto Rican stadium

== See also ==
- Juan Carlos Sánchez (disambiguation)
- Juan Boza Sánchez (1941–1991), gay Afro-Cuban-American artist
- Juan Carlos (footballer, born 1987) (born 1987), Spanish footballer
