= Baby video =

Educational tools for babies

Baby videos are educational tool which can be used for teaching babies as young as six months by introducing the alphabet, different sights, shapes and colors, numbers and counting. Baby videos can be used for helping babies learn important educational skills, comprehension, introduction to the environment, as well as music. Some parents use baby videos to help develop their children's motor skills and open their young minds to the world. Certain preschools, educators and caregivers find baby videos to be a useful tool, but medical professionals have yet to determine whether or not baby videos are beneficial to children or not.

Several baby videos are available on the market today. They include videos which introduce letters, music videos, or videos that teach babies to communicate when they are young such as signing videos.

The biggest benefit of digital media in early childhood education is the ability to expose children to the world during their “Why?” phase. Digital media will help explain things to children that parents may not have the ability to.

== History ==
The earliest forms of entertainment for children were usually meant to be educational. The very first television program that was tailored to children specifically was the BBC’s Children’s Hour, which was first broadcast in 1946 The United States followed suit in 1947 by airing Kukla, Fran, and Ollie, a show featuring puppets which ran for 10 years. Howdy Doody and Captain Kangaroo soon followed, and both ran for over 12 years. The shows that were being broadcast for children were successful, but not necessarily educational. Later on in the 1960s and 1970s, television shows for children began to change pace. Not only were the shows being released entertaining and loved by children, but they were also educational. Shows like Sesame Street, Mister Rogers’ Neighborhood, and Schoolhouse Rock! began to gain popularity. These shows’ target audiences were intended to be children in general without a specific age group.

In 1997 the Baby Einstein Company released its first video Baby Einstein. This was the first educational video targeted specifically to infants. The release of this particular brand of educational videos was very successful, and impactful. The New York Times published in 2003 that 32% of all new babies born in the United States owned a Baby Einstein video. There was a surge of educational media targeted towards infants and babies after the initial release of Baby Einstein. Television shows such as Teletubbies and Classical Baby were introduced. It was also around that time where TV channels dedicated to infant education such as BabyTV and BabyFirst became popular.

Thousands of baby oriented educational videos can be found on YouTube, teaching lessons about shapes, colors, numbers, etc. to babies specifically. Mother Goose Club is a YouTube channel devoted to educating infants and toddlers through the use of nursery rhymes. Mobile app developers have also seen the profitability of infant oriented media, and there are now hundreds of mobile applications specifically tailored to educate infants.

== Impact ==
The educational videos babies are exposed to could actually be harming them. Exposing babies to screens, could take away time that could be used for other things like exploring, interacting, playing, and actively learning. During the first two years, babies are beginning to develop intellectual, social, and emotional skills that are needed in life. If used correctly, these videos could possibly benefit a child's development. Babies are also learning language during the first two years which is a vital part of childhood development. Children could develop language skills by watching videos as they will begin to mimic the TV characters who talk to them.

Some researchers say that babies rarely benefit from digital media exposure while others say it's beneficial for their development. In some cases, babies show higher vocabulary from media. It's difficult for parents to determine how much their child is actually learning from the videos.

== Criticism ==
The use of baby videos is not without criticism. Frederick Zimmerman and Dimitri Christakis of the University of Washington published a study in 2007 that called the positive learning effect of the videos questionable, and say that they may in fact limit the language learning abilities of toddlers. They claim babies are drawn to the videos due to the rapid scene changes causing an orienting reflex.

Studies have “found that children exposed to educational programs were more aggressive in their interactions.” Educational programs are not only introducing young children to pro-education and pro-social goals, but the conflict between characters is often depicted with characters being unkind to each other or using aggressive actions with each other. The research claims that educational programs are by extension teaching these aggressive tendencies that are being shown in conflict development and that the young children are absorbing this information. This means while teaching them conflict resolution the shows are also teaching children how to behave while in a conflict, which in most cases is harsh and unkind.

Another aspect of educational programs focuses on how it takes away from the communicating opportunities between child and parent. A study shows the uses of book reading, toy playing, and co-TV viewing to study how well communication between parents and children were conducted. “Although not better than books, toy playing was significantly better than shared TV viewing at encouraging communication”. The study found that TV did not allow for much communication, but when there was communication it was relatively unrelated to what the toddler had asked or said. This is seen as a hindrance to the child's chance to learn. Educational programs are seen as a hindrance to young children in the aspect of learning due to the poor communication that is had between parent and child.

One study states that “until about age 2, studies show that young children can't cognitively comprehend what's being said and retain that information”. “Television-viewing also fosters less parent-child interaction, cutting down on what experts call “talk time,” in which a child hears lots of vocabulary words that in turn help develop their language abilities”. With no educational value being learned before the age of two and the lack of “talk time” that comes with educational programs this research shows the underside of educational television.

== Examples of popular infant entertainment ==
Title of program or video	initial release	media genre	number episodes	Country of origin
Sesame Street	1969	television	5,235	United States
Teletubbies	1997	television	425	United Kingdom
Blue's Clues	1996	television	143	United States
Baby Einstein	1997	DVD/video	28	United States
Mother Goose Club	2011	YouTube channel	717	United States

== See also ==
- Infant education
- Children's television series
- Children's film
- List of children's films
- Educational film
- Educational television
