= Early childhood education =

Teaching of children from birth to age eight

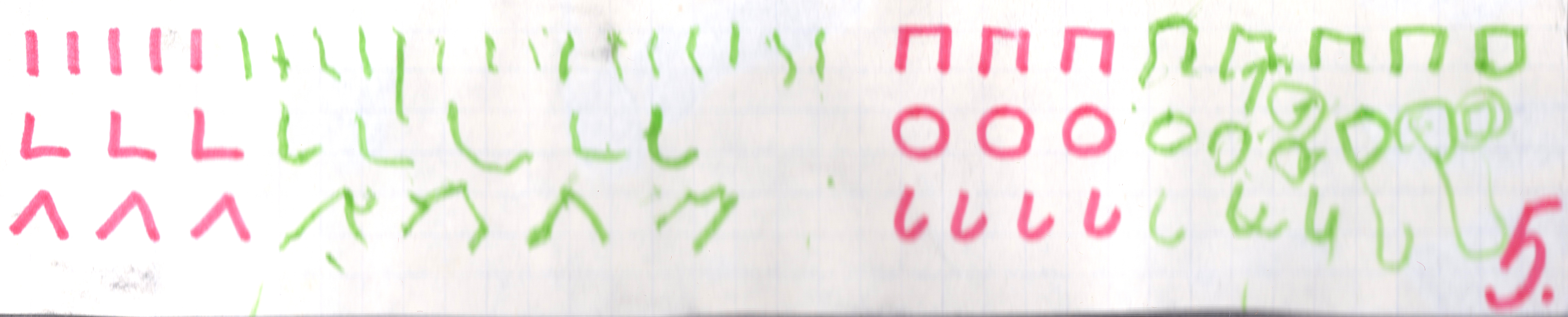
A test written by a four-year-old child in 1972, in the former Soviet Union. The lines are not ideal, but the teacher (all red writing) gave the best grade (5) anyway.

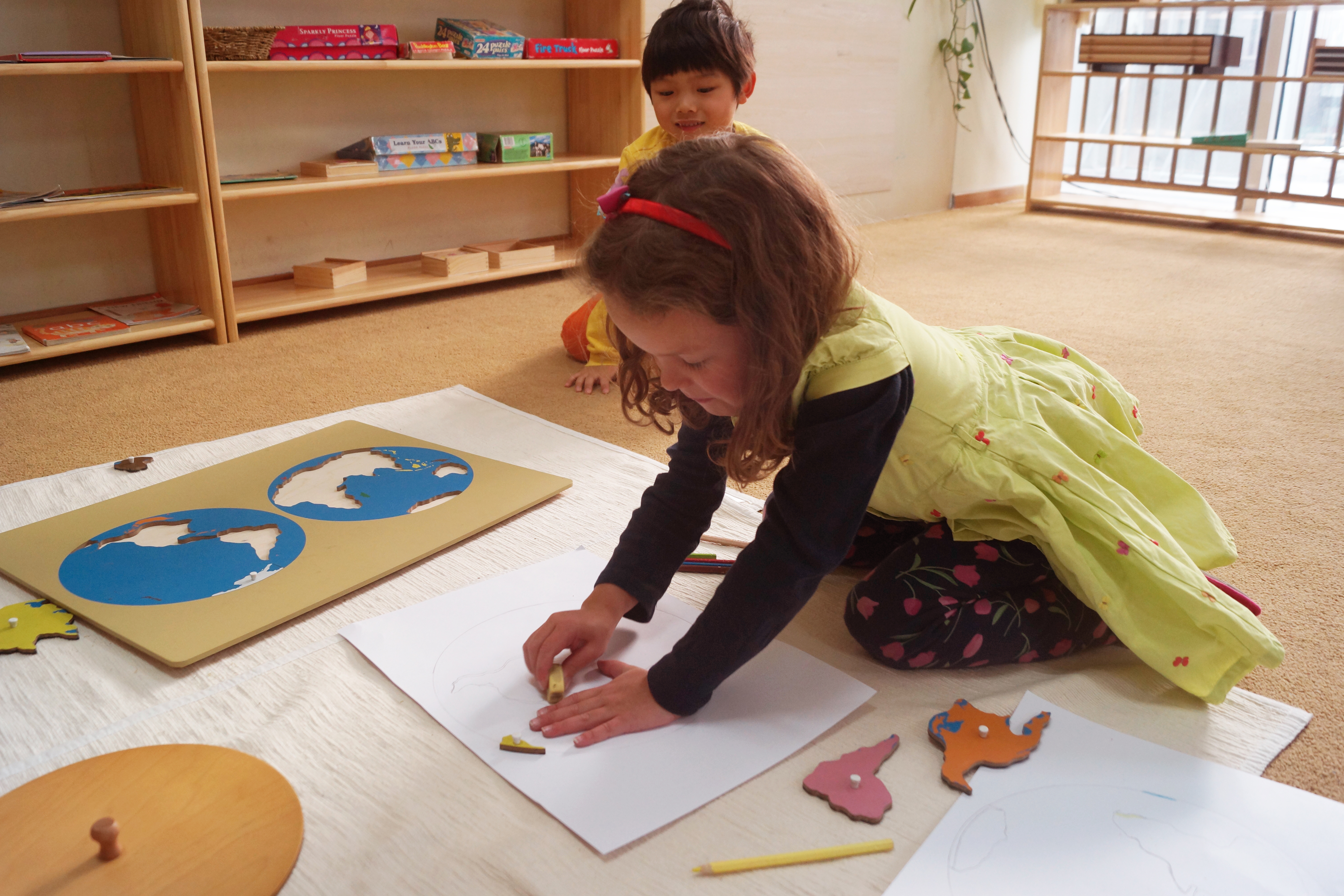
Geography in Montessori Early Childhood at QAIS

Early childhood education (ECE) is a branch of education theory that relates to the teaching of children (formally and informally) from birth up to the age of eight. Traditionally, this is up to the equivalent of third grade. ECE is described as an important period in child development.

ECE emerged as a field of study during the Enlightenment, particularly in European countries with high literacy rates. It continued to grow through the nineteenth century as universal primary education became a norm in the Western world. In recent years, early childhood education has become a prevalent public policy issue, as funding for preschool and pre-K is debated by municipal, state, and federal lawmakers. Governing entities are also debating the central focus of early childhood education with debate on developmental appropriate play versus strong academic preparation curriculum in reading, writing, and math. The global priority placed on early childhood education is underscored with targets of the United Nations Sustainable Development Goal 4. As of 2024, however, only 42% of 3-year olds, 59% of 3 year olds and 80% of 5 year olds are enrolled in education. Furthermore, levels of participation vary widely by region with fewer than one in two children attending pre-primary education in the Arab States compared to around 90% in Latin American and the Caribbean. Among the 20 countries with the world's lowest preschool participation rates, 14 were found to be in Africa in 2022. Following the Convention on the Rights of the Child in the 1990s, all Latin American countries enacted laws in accordance with the provisions of this international Convention, assuming state responsibility for the right to education of the youngest children.

In addition, headline statistics on the numbers enrolled in preschool are overestimates because they also count children who have entered primary school early. Globally 27% of children one year below the official primary school entry age are already in primary education and yet are counted as having benefited from early childhood education.

ECE is also a professional designation earned through a post-secondary education program. For example, in Ontario, Canada, the designations ECE (Early Childhood Educator) and RECE (Registered Early Childhood Educator) may only be used by registered members of the College of Early Childhood Educators, which is made up of accredited child care professionals who are held accountable to the College's standards of practice.

Research shows that early-childhood education has substantial positive short- and long-term effects on the children who attend such education, and that the costs are dwarfed by societal gains of the education programs.

According to the OECD, investing in high-quality early childhood education and care (ECEC) is a cost-effective way to significantly enhance children's cognitive, social and emotional development. Skills acquired at an early age provide the foundation for later learning and increase the effectiveness of subsequent educational investments. UNESCO GEM Report evidence has also linked participation in early childhood education with reducing disadvantage and supporting inclusion.

== Theories of child development ==
The Developmental Interaction Approach is based on the theories of Jean Piaget, Erik Erikson, John Dewey, and Lucy Sprague Mitchell. The approach focuses on learning through discovery. Jean Jacques Rousseau recommended that teachers should exploit individual children's interests to make sure each child obtains the information most essential to his personal and individual development. The five developmental domains of childhood development include:

- Physical: the way in which a child develops biological and physical functions, including eyesight and motor skills
- Social: the way in which a child interacts with others Children develop an understanding of their responsibilities and rights as members of families and communities, as well as an ability to relate to and work with others.
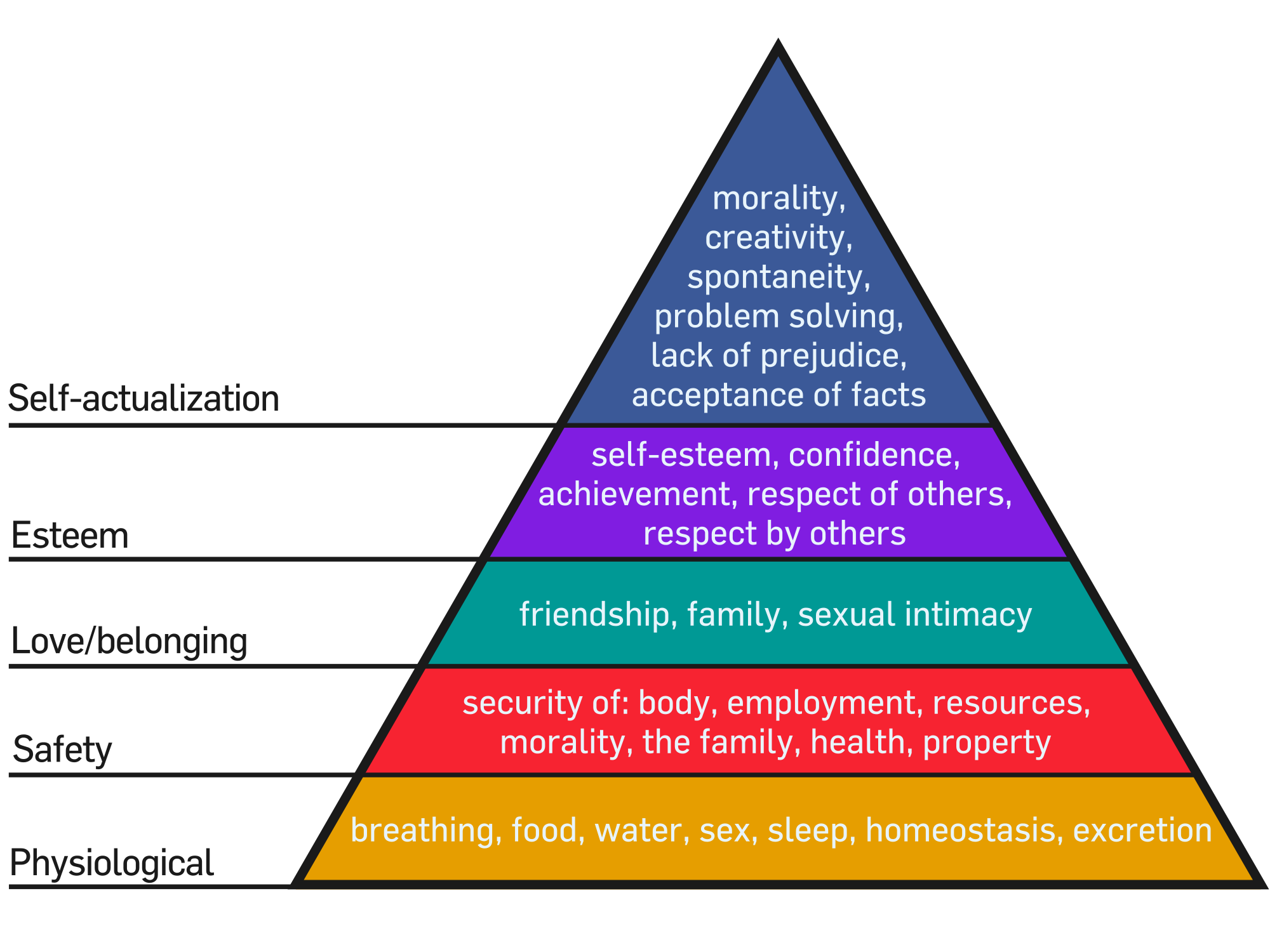
- Maslow's Hierarchy of Needs
  Emotional: the way in which a child creates emotional connections and develops self-confidence. Emotional connections develop when children relate to other people and share feelings.
- Language: the way in which a child communicates, including how they present their feelings and emotions, both to other people and to themselves. At 3 months, children employ different cries for different needs. At 6 months they can recognize and imitate the basic sounds of spoken language. In the first 3 years, children need to be exposed to communication with others in order to pick up language. "Normal" language development is measured by the rate of vocabulary acquisition.
- Cognitive skills: the way in which a child organizes information. Cognitive skills include problem solving, creativity, imagination and memory. They embody the way in which children make sense of the world. Piaget believed that children exhibit prominent differences in their thought patterns as they move through the stages of cognitive development: sensorimotor period, the pre-operational period, and the operational period.

To meet those developmental domains, a child has a set of needs that must be met for learning. Maslow's hierarchy of needs showcases the different levels of needs that must be met the chart to the right showcases these needs.

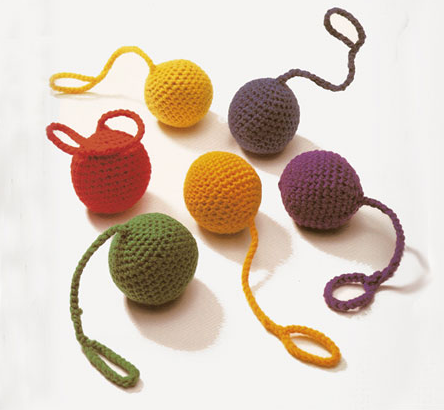
"Gift" developed by Friedrich Froebel

=== Froebel's play theory ===
Friedrich Froebel was a German Educator that believed in the idea of children learning through play. Specifically, he said, "play is the highest expression of human development in childhood, for it alone is the free expression of what is in the child's soul." Froebel believed that teachers should act as a facilitators and supporters for the students' play, rather than an authoritative, disciplinary figure. He created educational open-ended toys that he called "gifts" and "occupations" that were designed to encourage self-expression and initiation.

=== Reggio Emilia approach ===
Reggio Emilia is an educational philosophy that originated in the town of Reggio Emilia in northern Italy, shortly after World War II. It was developed under the leadership of educator Loris Malaguzzi, who believed that children are capable, curious, and full of potential. Central to the Reggio Emilia philosophy is the idea that children learn best through self-directed, experiential learning in relationship-driven environments. Young children are encouraged to explore their environment and to express themselves not limited to written, spoken, or signed forms, but can also be symbolic, metaphorical, imaginative, logical, and relational. Teachers in Reggio Emilia are viewed as co-learners and collaborators, guiding rather than instructing, and documentation of children's thinking and learning is a key practice to make learning visible.

=== Maria Montessori's approach ===
Maria Montessori was an Italian physician who, based on her observations of young children, developed a method of education that focused on independence, first applied at the Casa dei Bambini she opened in Rome in 1907. In Montessori education, a typical classroom is made up of students of different ages, and the curriculum is based on the students' developmental stages, which Montessori called the four planes of development.

Montessori's Four Planes of Development:

- The first plane (birth to age 6): During this stage, children soak up information about the world around them quickly, which is why Montessori refers to it as the "absorbent mind". Physical independence, such as completing tasks independently, is a main focus of the child at this time and children's individual personalities begin to form and develop.
- The second plane (Ages 6–12): During this stage, children also focus on independence, but intellectual rather than physical. Montessori classrooms use what is called "cosmic education" during this stage, which emphasizes children building on their understanding of the world, their place in it, and how everything is interdependent. Children in this plane also begin to develop abstract and moral thinking.
- The third plane (Ages 12–18): During this stage, adolescents shift to focus on emotional independence and on the self. Moral values, critical thinking, and self-identity are explored and strengthened.
- The fourth plane (Ages 18–24): During this last stage, focus shifts to financial independence. Young adults in this plane begin to solidify their personal beliefs, identity, and role in the world.

=== Vygotsky's socio-cultural learning theory ===
Russian psychologist Lev Vygotsky proposed a "socio-cultural learning theory" that emphasized the impact of social and cultural experiences on individual thinking and the development of mental processes. Vygotsky's theory emerged in the 1930s, and is still discussed today as a means of improving and reforming educational practices. Vygotsky also developed the theory of the zone of proximal development. This theory ties in with children building off prior knowledge and gaining new knowledge related to skills they already have. It further describes how new knowledge or skills are taken in if they are not fully learned, but are starting to emerge.

A teacher or older friend lends support to a child learning a skill, be it building a block castle, tying a shoe, or writing one's name. As the child becomes more capable of the steps of the activity, the adult or older child withdraws supports gradually, until the child is competent completing the process on his/her own. This is done within that activity's zone—the distance between where the child is, and where he potentially will be. In each zone of proximal development, they build on skills and grow by learning more skills in their proximal development range. They build on the skills by being guided by teachers and parents. They must build from where they are in their zone of proximal development.

Vygotsky argued that since cognition occurs within a social context, our social experiences shape our ways of thinking about and interpreting the world. People such as parents, grandparents, and teachers play the roles of what Vygotsky described as knowledgeable and competent adults. Although Vygotsky predated social constructivists, he is commonly classified as one. Social constructivists believe that an individual's cognitive system is a resditional learning time. Vygotsky advocated that teachers facilitate rather than direct student learning. Teachers should provide a learning environment where students can explore and develop their learning without direct instruction. His approach calls for teachers to incorporate students' needs and interests. It is important to do this because students' levels of interest and abilities will vary and there needs to be differentiation.

However, teachers can enhance understandings and learning for students. Vygotsky states that by sharing meanings that are relevant to the children's environment, adults promote cognitive development as well. Their teachings can influence thought processes and perspectives of students when they are in new and similar environments. Since Vygotsky promotes more facilitation in children's learning, he suggests that knowledgeable people (and adults in particular), can also enhance knowledges through cooperative meaning-making with students in their learning, this can be done through the zone of proximal development by guiding children's learning or thinking skills. Vygotsky's approach encourages guided participation and student exploration with support. Teachers can help students achieve their cognitive development levels through consistent and regular interactions of collaborative knowledge-making learning processes.

=== Piaget's constructivist theory ===
Jean Piaget's constructivist theory gained influence in the 1970s and '80s. Although Piaget himself was primarily interested in a descriptive psychology of cognitive development, he also laid the groundwork for a constructivist theory of learning. Piaget believed that learning comes from within: children construct their own knowledge of the world through experience and subsequent reflection. He said that "if logic itself is created rather than being inborn, it follows that the first task of education is to form reasoning." Within Piaget's framework, teachers should guide children in acquiring their own knowledge rather than simply transferring knowledge.

According to Piaget's theory, when young children encounter new information, they attempt to accommodate and assimilate it into their existing understanding of the world. Accommodation involves adapting mental schemas and representations to make them consistent with reality. Assimilation involves fitting new information into their pre-existing schemas. Through these two processes, young children learn by equilibrating their mental representations with reality. They also learn from mistakes.

A Piagetian approach emphasizes experiential education; in school, experiences become more hands-on and concrete as students explore through trial and error. Thus, crucial components of early childhood education include exploration, manipulating objects, and experiencing new environments. Subsequent reflection on these experiences is equally important.

Piaget's concept of reflective abstraction was particularly influential in mathematical education. Through reflective abstraction, children construct more advanced cognitive structures out of the simpler ones they already possess. This allows children to develop mathematical constructs that cannot be learned through equilibration – making sense of experiences through assimilation and accommodation – alone.

According to Piagetian theory, language and symbolic representation is preceded by the development of corresponding mental representations. Research shows that the level of reflective abstraction achieved by young children was found to limit the degree to which they could represent physical quantities with written numerals. Piaget held that children can invent their own procedures for the four arithmetical operations, without being taught any conventional rules.

Piaget's theory implies that computers can be a great educational tool for young children when used to support the design and construction of their projects. McCarrick and Li found that computer play is consistent with this theory. However, Plowman and Stephen found that the effectiveness of computers is limited in the preschool environment; their results indicate that computers are only effective when directed by the teacher. This suggests, according to the constructivist theory, that the role of preschool teachers is critical in successfully adopting computers as they existed in 2003.

=== Kolb's experiential learning theory ===
David Kolb's experiential learning theory, which was influenced by John Dewey, Kurt Lewin and Jean Piaget, argues that children need to experience things to learn: "The process whereby knowledge is created through the transformation of experience. Knowledge results from the combinations of grasping and transforming experience." The experimental learning theory is distinctive in that children are seen and taught as individuals. As a child explores and observes, teachers ask the child probing questions. The child can then adapt prior knowledge to learning new information.

Kolb breaks down this learning cycle into four stages: concrete experience, reflective observation, abstract conceptualization, and active experimentation. Children observe new situations, think about the situation, make meaning of the situation, then test that meaning in the world around them.

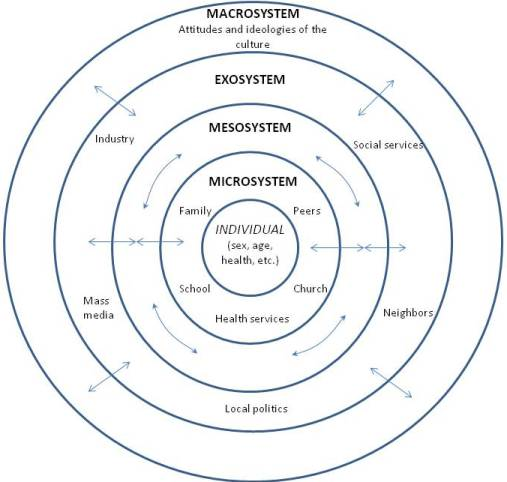

=== Bronfenbrenner's ecological systems theory ===
Similar to Kolb's experiential learning theory, which emphasizes a child's relationship with the world around them, Urie Bronfenbrenner's Ecological Systems Theory considers the ways in which systems at various levels impact an individual's development. The five levels, in his view, are:

- The individual: these influences (genetics, age, etc.) take place within the individual to influence their development.
- The microsystem: a specific setting that impacts the individual in a habitual way (family, classrooms, peers, etc.).
- The mesosystem: this describes how microsystems relate to one another. For example, school demands so much time and attention it reduces the influence available by one's peer group.
- The exosystem: this system comprises settings which do not involve an individual but still exert an impact on their development. A child's parent getting a new supervisor at work that does a poor job and increases this parent's life stress would occur in the exosystem, as the child may never enter this location, but still be significantly affected by the changes to their parent's mood, behavior, and/or availability.
- The Macrosystem: this level captures the values and structures that shape all the systems and relationships in previous levels. This describes not only governmental policies, but also the broader attitudes that a society uses to judge what is deemed desirable or acceptable.

One of the chief reasons Bronfenbrenner conceptualizes development in this way is not merely to highlight the role of one's context, but to illustrate the multiple determinants of one's developmental trajectory while also capturing their individual agency. This approach blends disciplines of biology, psychology, sociology, and anthropology to more fully capture the complexity of development. One of the main contributions that Bronfenbrenner's work had on the American childcare system was through his co-founding of the federal Head Start program.

== Practical implications of early childhood education ==
In recent decades, studies have shown that early childhood education is critical in preparing children to enter and succeed in the (grade school) classroom, diminishing their risk of social-emotional mental health problems and increasing their self-sufficiency later in their lives. In other words, the child needs to be taught to rationalize everything and to be open to interpretations and critical thinking. There is no subject to be considered taboo, starting with the most basic knowledge of the world that they live in, and ending with deeper areas, such as morality, religion and science. Visual stimulus and response time as early as 3 months can be an indicator of verbal and performance IQ at age 4 years. When parents value ECE and its importance their children generally have a higher rate of attendance. This allows children the opportunity to build and nurture trusting relationships with educators and social relationships with peers.

By providing education in a child's most formative years, ECE also has the capacity to pre-emptively begin closing the educational achievement gap between low and high-income students before formal schooling begins. Children of low socioeconomic status (SES) often begin school already behind their higher SES peers; on average, by the time they are three, children with high SES have three times the number of words in their vocabularies as children with low SES. Participation in ECE, however, has been proven to increase high school graduation rates, improve performance on standardized tests, and reduce both grade repetition and the number of children placed in special education. One study across 13 Francophone countries in Africa found that students who attended some form of organized early childhood education scored 66 points higher in reading on average than those who did not, which is equivalent to more than a year of learning.

A study was conducted by the Aga Khan Development Network's Madrasa Early Childhood Programme on the impact that early childhood education had on students' performance in grade school. Looking specifically at students who attended the Madrasa Early Childhood schools (virtually all of whom came from economically disadvantaged backgrounds), the study found that they had consistently ranked in the top 20% in grade 1 classes. The study also concluded that any formal early childhood education contributed to higher levels of cognitive development in language, mathematics, and non-verbal reasoning skills.

Especially since the first wave of results from the Perry Preschool Project were published, there has been widespread consensus that the quality of early childhood education programs correlate with gains in low-income children's IQs and test scores, decreased grade retention, and lower special education rates.

Several studies have reported that children enrolled in ECE increase their IQ scores by 4–11 points by age five, while a Milwaukee study reported a 25-point gain. In addition, students who had been enrolled in the Abecedarian Project, an often-cited ECE study, scored significantly higher on reading and math tests by age fifteen than comparable students who had not participated in early childhood programs. In addition, 36% of students in the Abecedarian Preschool Study treatment group would later enroll in four-year colleges compared to 14% of those in the control group.

In 2017, researchers reported that children who participate in ECE graduate high school at significantly greater rates than those who do not. Additionally, those who participate in ECE require special education and must repeat a grade at significantly lower rates than their peers who did not receive ECE. The NIH asserts that ECE leads to higher test scores for students from preschool through age 21, improved grades in math and reading, and stronger odds that students will keep going to school and attend college.

Nathaniel Hendren and Ben Sprung-Keyser, two Harvard economists, found high Marginal Values of Public Funds (MVPFs) for investments in programs supporting the health and early education of children, particularly those that reach children from low-income families. The average MVPF for these types of initiatives is over 5, while the MVPFs for programs for adults generally range from 0.5 to 2.

Beyond benefitting societal good, ECE also significantly impacts the socioeconomic outcomes of individuals. For example, by age 26, students who had been enrolled in Chicago Child-Parent Centers were less likely to be arrested, abuse drugs, and receive food stamps; they were more likely to have high school diplomas, health insurance and full-time employment. Studies also show that ECE heightens social engagement, bolsters lifelong health, reduces the incidence of teen pregnancy, supports mental health, decreases the risk of heart disease, and lengthens lifespans.

The World Bank's 2019 World Development Report on The Changing Nature of Work identifies early childhood development programs as one of the most effective ways governments can equip children with the skills they will need to succeed in future labor markets.

According to a 2020 study in the Journal of Political Economy by Clemson University economist Jorge Luis García, Nobel laureate James J. Heckman and University of Southern California economists Duncan Ermini Leaf and María José Prados, every dollar spent on a high-quality early-childhood programs led to a return of $7.3 over the long-term.

=== The Perry Preschool Project ===
The Perry Preschool Project, which was conducted in the 1960s in Ypsilanti, Michigan, is the oldest social experiment in the field of early childhood education and has heavily influenced policy in the United States and across the globe. The experiment enrolled 128 three- and four-year-old African-American children with cognitive disadvantage from low-income families, who were then randomly assigned to treatment and control groups. The intervention for children in the treatment group included active learning preschool sessions on weekdays for 2.5 hours per day. The intervention also included weekly visits by the teachers to the homes of the children for about 1.5 hours per visit to improve parent-child interactions at home.

Initial evaluations of the Perry intervention showed that the preschool program failed to significantly boost an IQ measure. However, later evaluations that followed up the participants for more than fifty years have demonstrated the long-term economic benefits of the program, even after accounting for the small sample size of the experiment, flaws in its randomization procedure, and sample attrition. There is some evidence on reduction of criminal convictions of male participants, especially for violent crime, and their earnings in middle adulthood. Research points to improvements in non-cognitive skills, executive functioning, childhood home environment, and parental attachment as potential sources of the observed long-term impacts of the program. The intervention's many benefits also include improvements in late-midlife health for both male and female participants. Perry promoted educational attainment through two avenues: total years of education attained and rates of progression to a given level of education. Treated females received less special education, progressed more quickly through grades, earned higher GPAs, and attained higher levels of education than their control group counterparts.

Research also demonstrates spillover effects of the Perry program on the children and siblings of the original participants. A study concludes, "The children of treated participants have fewer school suspensions, higher levels of education and employment, and lower levels of participation in crime, compared with the children of untreated participants. Impacts are especially pronounced for the children of male participants. These treatment effects are associated with improved childhood home environments." The study also documents beneficial impacts on the male siblings of the original participants. The Perry Preschool Project advocates for public spending on early childhood programs as an economic investment in a society's future, rather than in the interest of social justice.

== International agreements ==
The Universal Declaration of Human Rights (1948), the International Covenant on Economic, Social, and Cultural Rights (1976), and the Convention on the Rights of the Child (1989) have all addressed childhood education. Article 28 of the Convention on the Rights of the Child states that "States Parties recognized the right of the child to education, and with a view to achieving this right progression and on the basis of equal opportunity, they shall, in particular:

1. Make primary education compulsory and available free to all;
2. Encourage the development of different forms of secondary education, including general and vocational education, and take appropriate measures such as the introduction of free education and offering financial assistance in case of need;
3. Make higher education accessible to all on the basis of capacity by every appropriate means;
4. Make educational and vocational information and guidance available and accessible to all children;
5. Take measures to encourage regular attendance at schools and the reduction of drop-out rates."

The first World Conference on Early Childhood Care and Education took place in Moscow from 27 to 29 September 2010, jointly organized by UNESCO and the city of Moscow. The overarching goals of the conference are to:

- Reaffirm ECCE as a right of all children and as the basis for development
- Take stock of the progress of Member States towards achieving the EFA Goal 1
- Identify binding constraints toward making the intended equitable expansion of access to quality ECCE services
- Establish, more concretely, benchmarks and targets for the EFA Goal 1 toward 2015 and beyond
- Identify key enablers that should facilitate Member States to reach the established targets
- Promote global exchange of good practices

Under Goal 4 of the Sustainable Development Goals, which the UN General Assembly unanimously approved in 2015, countries committed to "ensure inclusive and equitable quality education' including early childhood." Two targets related to goal 4 are "by 2030, ensure that all girls and boys have access to quality early childhood development, care and pre-primary education so that they are ready for primary education." The 'Framework for Action' adopted by UNESCO member states later in 2015 outlines how to translate this last target into practice, and encourages states to provide "at least one year of free and compulsory pre-primary education of good quality." The Sustainable Development Goals, however, are not binding international law.

It has been argued that "International law provides no effective protection of the right to pre-primary education." Just two global treaties explicitly reference education prior to primary school. The Convention on the Elimination of All Forms of Discrimination against Women requires states to ensure equality for girls "in pre-school." And in the Convention on the Protection of the Rights of All Migrant Workers and Members of Their Families, states agree that access to "public pre-school educational institutions" shall not be denied due to the parents' or child's "irregular situation with respect to stay."

Less explicitly, the Convention on the Rights of Persons with Disabilities requires that "States Parties shall ensure an inclusive education system at all levels."

In June 2024, the UN's Human Rights Council approved the establishment of a working group with the mandate of "exploring the possibility of, elaborating and submitting to the Human Rights Council a draft optional protocol to the Convention on the Rights of the Child with the aim to: (a) Explicitly recognize that the right to education includes early childhood care and education; (b) Explicitly state that, with a view to achieving the right to education, States shall: (i) Make public pre-primary education available free to all, beginning with at least one year."

According to UNESCO, a preschool curriculum is one that delivers educational content through daily activities and furthers a child's physical, cognitive, and social development. Generally, preschool curricula are only recognized by governments if they are based on academic research and reviewed by peers.

Preschool for Child Rights have pioneered into preschool curricular areas and is contributing into child rights through their preschool curriculum.

Percentage of children aged 36 to 59 months who are developmentally on track, 2009–2017

== Curricula in early childhood care and education ==
Curricula in early childhood care and education (ECCE) is the driving force behind any ECCE programme. It is 'an integral part of the engine that, together with the energy and motivation of staff, provides the momentum that makes programmes live'. It follows therefore that the quality of a programme is greatly influenced by the quality of its curriculum. In early childhood, these may be programs for children or parents, including health and nutrition interventions and prenatal programs, as well as center-based programs for children.

== Barriers and challenges ==
Children's learning potential and outcomes are negatively affected by exposure to violence, abuse and child labour. Thus, protecting young children from violence and exploitation is part of broad educational concerns. Due to difficulties and sensitivities around the issue of measuring and monitoring child protection violations and gaps in defining, collecting and analysing appropriate indicators, data coverage in this area is scant. However, proxy indicators can be used to assess the situation. For example, ratification of relevant international conventions indicates countries' commitment to child protection. By April 2014, 194 countries had ratified the CRC3; and 179 had ratified the 1999 International Labour Organization's Convention (No. 182) concerning the elimination of the worst forms of child labour. However, many of these ratifications are yet to be given full effect through actual implementation of concrete measures. Globally, 150 million children aged 5–14 are estimated to be engaged in child labour. In conflict-affected poor countries, children are twice as likely to die before their fifth birthday compared to those in other poor countries. In industrialized countries, a study by UNESCO shows, 4 per cent of children are physically abused each year and 10 per cent are neglected or psychologically abused.

In both developed and developing countries, children of the poor and the disadvantaged remain the least served, despite that the added value of early childhood care and education services are higher for them than for their more affluent counterparts, even when such services are of modest quality. While the problem is more intractable in developing countries, the developed world still does not equitably provide quality early childhood care and education services for all its children. In many European countries, children, mostly from low-income and immigrant families, do not have access to good quality early childhood care and education.

The effect of early childhood programs tends to decrease from proof of concept trials to larger-scale programs.

=== Orphan education ===
A lack of education during the early childhood years for orphans is a worldwide concern. Orphans are at higher risk of "missing out on schooling, living in households with less food security, and suffering from anxiety and depression." Education during these years has the potential to improve a child's "food and nutrition, health care, social welfare, and protection." This crisis is especially prevalent in Sub-Saharan Africa which has been heavily impacted by the aids epidemic. UNICEF reports that "13.3 million children (0–17 years) worldwide have lost one or both parents to AIDS. Nearly 12 million of these children live in sub-Saharan Africa." Government policies such as the Free Basic Education Policy have worked to provide education for orphan children in this area, but the quality and inclusiveness of this policy has brought criticism.

== Notable early childhood educators ==
- Fred Rogers
- Charles Eugene Beatty
- Friedrich Fröbel
- Elizabeth Harrison
- David P. Weikart
- Juan Sánchez Muliterno, President of The World Association of Early Childhood Educators
- Maria Montessori
- Erik Erikson
- Chris Pascal, founding member of the European Early Childhood Education Research Association

== See also ==
- Baby video
- Bright from the Start
- Compensatory education
- Head Start Program
- Pretend play
- Men in early childhood education
- Playwork
- Primary education
- Reading
- Waldorf education
