= Daniel Pesut =

American educator and researcher

Daniel J. Pesut
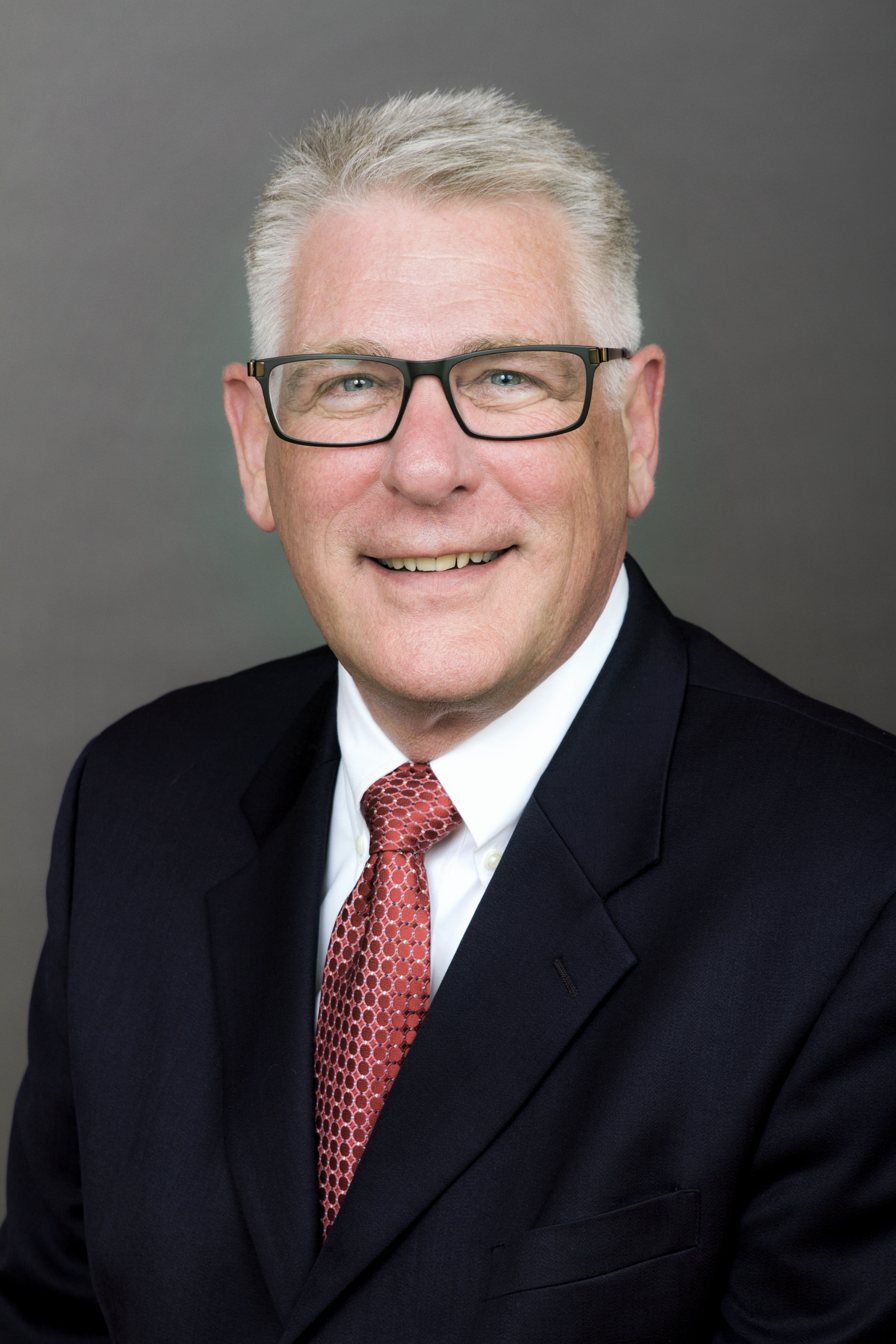
- Born: DeKalb, Illinois, USA
- Occupations: Nurse educator, academic and researcher
- Title: Emeritus Professor of Nursing; Emeritus Katharine R. and C. Walton Lillehei Chair in Nursing Leadership
- Awards: Fellow, the American Academy of Nursing; Luther Christman Award, American Association for Men in Nursing

Academic background
- Education: B.S. N., Nursing; M.S.N., Psychiatric Nursing; Ph.D., Nursing
- Alma mater: Northern Illinois University; University of Texas Health Science Center at San Antonio; University of Michigan

Daniel J. Pesut is an American nurse educator, academic, researcher, and coach. He is an emeritus professor of nursing, past director of Katharine J. Densford International Center for Nursing Leadership, and Katherine R. and C. Walton Lillehei Chair in Nursing Leadership at University of Minnesota.

Pesut's research is focused on nursing education. He has worked on creative-teaching learning methods, self-regulation of health status, clinical reasoning, executive coaching, and leadership development in the health professions.

Sigma Theta Tau International Honor Society of Nursing established the Daniel J. Pesut Spirit of Renewal Award in 2005 to honor his contributions to the field.

== Education ==
Pesut received his B.S.N. degree in nursing from Northern Illinois University in 1975 and his M.S.N. degree in psychiatric nursing from the University of Texas. He completed his doctoral degree in nursing from the University of Michigan in 1984.

== Career ==
Pesut worked as a staff nurse and clinical nurse specialist for United States Army Nurse Corps during the 1970s and then joined the University of Michigan's School of Nursing as an associate professor in 1978. At Michigan he served as psychiatric clinical nurse specialist and educational nurse specialist from 1981 until 1984. He served as associate institute director and director of nursing services of William S. Hall Psychiatric Institute from 1984 to 1987. In 1987, Pesut returned to the University of South Carolina College of Nursing as an associate professor and associate dean for administrative affairs.

In 1997, Pesut left the University of South Carolina and was appointed as professor and department chair of environments for health at Indiana University School of Nursing (1997–2005). He then became the associate dean for academic programs and director of the PhD program. From 2010 till 2012, he was associated with IUPUI as a professor and senior faculty fellow. Pesut then joined the University of Minnesota School of Nursing in 2012 as a professor of nursing and director of the Katharine J Densford International Center for Nursing Leadership and was appointed as Katherine R. and C. Walton Lillehei Chair in Nursing Leadership.

Pesut is the principal of a coaching and consulting business.

== Research ==
Pesut has conducted research on nursing education, along with creative-teaching learning methods, self-regulation of health status, clinical reasoning, academic career coaching, and leadership development in the health professions. He has focused his research on how the creative processes support personal and professional development, enhance clinical reasoning, and provide a foundation for future thinking.

=== Clinical reasoning ===
Pesut explored the effect of self-regulated learning theory on reflective practice in nursing, and found that students’ cognitive and metacognitive skills were improved by using self-regulated learning strategies, and these skills in turn supported the development of clinical reasoning skills in nursing students.

Pesut studied the three generations of traditional nursing process and proposed a third-generation model, called the outcome present state test (OPT) model, that highlighted the importance of critical, metacognitive, and thinking skills that support outcome specification and testing in clinical reasoning. In the 2000, Pesut conducted research on using the OPT model to promote clinical reasoning in nursing students. He also worked on application and evaluation of teaching-learning strategies associated with self-regulated learning model (SRL) and the OPT model. Pesut's study indicated that the use of guided reflection along with the learning tools of the OPT model increased clinical reasoning skill acquisition, and improved the effectiveness of structured teaching learning strategies.

=== Creative-teaching learning methods ===
Pesut worked on problem-based learning (PBL) as a teaching strategy and conducted a study to assess the impact of PBL curriculum on master's students' learning style inventory (LSI). He applied experiential learning theory to compare LSI scores of MSN students before and after two semesters of using PBL in nursing administration core courses. His study indicated that students' preference increased for the conceptualizing–experiencing pole in the learning cycle. Pesut also applied Boyatzis and Kolb's Learning Skills Profile to assess the outcomes of a problem-based learning MSN program and observed increases in all the learning skills.

=== Nursing practice ===
Pesut developed a model that conceptualized creative thinking as a self-regulatory process and reframed creativity technologies as metacognitive strategies. He highlighted the various implications of the model regarding education, research, and program development in creativity training endeavors. He studied behavioral motivation and work motivation theories and derived a model of nurses' work motivation regarding the human caring stance of professional nursing work. His proposed model provides various leadership and management strategies to develop a motivational caring culture in health care organizations.

Pesut studied the implementation of complex systems theory in the fields of nursing education and practice, and highlighted the role of nursing informaticists in the integration of emerging computational tools.

=== Foresight leadership ===
Pesut’s later research is focused on the development of foresight leadership initiative in nursing and healthcare domains. He conducted various presentations regarding the concept of foresight leadership. Pesut also focused on the importance of foresight leadership in the anticipation of disruptive innovations in health care. He highlighted the various selected disruptive trends along with the strategies and resources needed to develop foresight leadership in health care and nursing, which can then be used for anticipating future trends influencing doctoral nursing education.

== Awards and honors ==
- 1995 - Fellowship, the American Academy of Nursing
- 1997 - Honorary Fellow, Amy V. Cockcroft Nursing Leadership Development Program
- 2002 - Luther Christman Award, American Assembly for Men in Nursing
- 2003-2005 - President, the Honor Society of Nursing, Sigma Theta Tau International
- 2017 - Gene Tranbarger Award, American Association for Men in Nursing
- 2019 - Visionary Leadership Award, University of Texas Health Science Center School of Nursing

== Bibliography ==
=== Books ===
- Clinical Reasoning: The Art and Science of Critical and Creative Thinking (1999) ISBN 0-8273-7869-6
- Bounce Forward: The Extraordinary Resilience of Nurse Leadership (2015) ISBN 978-1558105911
- Clinical Reasoning and Care Coordination in Advanced Practice Nursing (2016) ISBN 978-0826131836
- The Essentials of Clinical Reasoning for Nurses: Using the Outcome-Present State Test Model for Reflective Practice (2017) ISBN 978-1945157097

=== Selected articles ===
- Pesut, D. J., & Herman, J. (1998). OPT: Transformation of nursing process for contemporary practice. Nursing Outlook, 46(1), 29–36.
- Pesut, D. (2003). Presidential Call to Action: Create the Future through Renewal, Sigma Theta Tau International Honor Society of Nursing
- Kuiper, R. A., & Pesut, D. J. (2004). Promoting cognitive and metacognitive reflective reasoning skills in nursing practice: self-regulated learning theory. Journal of advanced nursing, 45(4), 381–391.
- Kautz, D., Kuiper, R., Pesut, D., Knight-Brown, P., Daneker, D. (2005). Promoting clinical reasoning in undergraduate nursing students: Application and evaluation of the outcome present state test (OPT) model of clinical reasoning. International Journal of Nursing Scholarship, 2(1), 1-21
- Moody, R.C. & Pesut, D.J. (2006). “The Motivation to Care: Application and Extension of Motivation Theory to Professional Nursing Work”. Journal of Health, Organization, and Management, 20(1), 15–48, Emerald Group Publishing Limited.
- Baker, C., Pesut, D., McDaniel, A., & Fisher, M (2007). Evaluating the impact of problem-based learning on learning styles of master's students in nursing administration. Journal of Professional Nursing, 23(4), 214–219.
- Clancy, Thomas, Effken, Judith, & Pesut, Daniel. (2008). Applications of complex systems theory in nursing education, research and practice, Nursing Outlook, 56(5), 248–256.
- Linderman, A., Pesut, D., & Disch, J. (2015). Sense making and knowledge transfer: Capturing the knowledge and wisdom of nursing leaders. Journal of professional nursing, 31(4), 290–297.
- Pesut, D. J., & Thompson, S. A. (2018). Nursing leadership in academic nursing: The wisdom of development and the development of wisdom. Journal of Professional Nursing, 34(2), 122–127.
- Pesut, D. J. (2019). Anticipating disruptive innovations with foresight leadership. Nursing administration quarterly, 43(3), 196–204.
