= Men in early childhood education =

Men's role in providing young children with education

Men in early childhood education comprise a very low minority in the profession. Early childhood education is among the most female-dominated industries in terms of employment. Based on studies, estimates on the percentage of workers in the sector who are men include 1.4%, 2%, 2.4%, and 3%. Due to the low percentage of men in early childhood education, there is also little representation of queer men or men of colour overall in the field.

== Challenges, disadvantage and field presence ==
There a variety of negative factors related to men in early childhood education that are reasons for the low percentage and/or present challenges and disadvantages to men already working in the field:

- The care and education of young children is commonly seen as an extension of women's roles as mothers. Society tends to see women as the adults who stay home and care for the children. Thus, society generally considers the ECE field to be a “women’s profession”, perceiving it as one where women understand it and perform much better than men.
- Many men who might otherwise consider entering the field, choose not to for fears of being labeled as gay, or not a “real man”.
- Some people perceive all women to be safe with working directly with young children, whereas any man would be considered suspect for being in the profession, having ulterior motives such as pedophilia or child abuse.
- Traditionally, men are the breadwinner of the family. But early childhood education is a low-paying field. This makes the breadwinner model much more difficult for men to follow compared to other professions.

== Positive impact ==
“Men can bring different skills and qualities to the profession which could help to broaden the curriculum and enhance the quality of the service. Having a male childcare worker present is good for staff relationships and brings a healthy mix.” Research suggests that men “do have different styles from women in many aspects of their work such as their use of language, risk-acceptance, physical play and humour, as well as behaviour in staff meetings, input in policy discussions etc. Men are not better than women, but they are different and together men and women create a rich culture in which to raise child”.

Men in early childhood education offer distinct benefits that are either rare, difficult, or impossible to attain in an all-female teacher setting:

- Whereas women tend to foster a nurturing, calm, and positive environment, men promote a more active and physical environment. This can be particularly meaningful for boys, as their styles of play, learning, and thinking are more likely to be valued, accepted, and expanded. For girls, it can expose them to new ways of playing, learning, and thinking that they may not have experienced before.
- Fathers of children will have someone that they can more closely relate to in their parenting experiences, particularly single fathers because they are raising children alone and thus will likely need to be more autonomous in their parenting life.
- Children of single mothers greatly benefit from having a father figure when there is none present in the home. This can happen for reasons such as divorce, separation, abandonment, and incarceration, among others. Additionally, such children have the opportunity to experience a positive male role model.
- When there are men in their early education settings, children are able to observe and experience positive professional relationships between men and women. At a young age, children absorb much of what is modeled in front of them, so those relationships have a huge lasting impact on them.
- Male and female brains process information differently. Thus, male educators offer a new perspective when dealing with situations involving the children.
- Early childhood settings that previously had an all-female teaching staff may have had gender issues that no one recognized before. Having a male can challenge those stereotypes in relation to toys and activities.

Gender based positive impact may stem from socially constructed ideas of gender, as sexist stereotypes of the traits of men and women are prevalent in society as a whole.

== Advantages for male educators ==
Advantages for men in feminized jobs like Early Childhood Education may depend on a variety of factors such as location, culture and educational background.

Due to the rarity of men in the field, some advantages may include:

- Finding employment easily
- More employment opportunities
- Quicker job advancement or promotion
- Supportive relationships with colleagues

These advantages may be a form of affirmative action, as the underrepresentation of men in the field becomes a barrier to recruitment and inclusion.

== Queer men and early childhood education ==
Male educators who identify as queer are not only faced with the challenges of being a minority within the field of Early Childhood Education, they also must manage the perception of their identity and its impact on their work. Homophobia plays a large part in how queer men are perceived, which can lead to discrimination at work and in the field as a whole.

"One highly influential homophobic myth that has been prevalent in early childhood educational settings (and within the broader society) is the perception of ‘homosexuals’ as paedophiles and sexual predators".

The myths and stereotypes of queer men in early childhood settings are thought to be partially responsible for the low percentage of men in the field. Despite the challenges and discrimination queer men face in early learning environments, their representation has a positive impact creating safe spaces for other queer educators, parents and children.

While there are barriers to men entering the field as a whole, information regarding the experiences of queer men is difficult to find. More research into this marginalized group is needed to further understand their experiences and make improvements.

== Men of colour and early childhood education ==
Another marginalized group within Early Childhood Education is men of colour. Societal expectations of masculinity and race perpetuate stereotypical views of identity that may prevent men from choosing to work with children in early learning environments. To relate and connect to all children and families in their care, men of colour must have a lens of double consciousness or use code switching, to fit the support needs of the diverse backgrounds of those in their care.

Some barriers to men of colour entering the field include:

- Limited representation in education for young men of colour when choosing higher education
- Required understanding of how to navigate social settings using cultural code switching
- Systematic indifference to inclusion and recruitment
- Limited opportunity for mentorship by men of colour

Children benefit from having role models they can relate to as they are constructing and forming their identities. Men of colour strengthen representation within the Early Childhood Education field, and can provide much needed culturally relevant education to children of colour and other children.

== Activism ==
The Novak Djokovic Foundation founded and run by accomplished tennis player Novak Djokovic advocates for the importance of men in the field of early childhood education.

The Office of Early Childhood Education, New Zealand offers an award available to any male born or with full citizenship in New Zealand with intent to enroll in a registered Early Childhood Education degree program.

The World Forum Foundation runs a working group to advocate for the inclusion, recruitment and support of male early childhood educators. This forum includes chapters in various countries around the world.

The National Association for the Education of Young Children (NAEYC) provides a MEN interest forum to members who would like to participate, reflect and learn more about the recruitment and retention of men in early childhood education settings.

== See also ==
- Men in nursing
