= American Association for Men in Nursing =

The American Association for Men in Nursing (AAMN) is a professional organization for nurses that works to improve gender inclusion in nursing profession. The AAMN runs an annual award scheme which aims to recognize contributions made to the profession.

The AAMN currently has 64 chapters spread across the US.

== History ==
AAMN was established in 1971 by Steve Miller, a nurse, set up a group of like-minded men in Michigan.

However, the Association was later propelled and reorganized by Luther Christman, PhD, RN (1915–2011) In 1981 after Steve Miller left to law school in 1974.

The group claims to have 23,000 members across the USA.

== Stated aims ==
The AAMN aims to encourage and support men in nursing.
