= Juan Carlos Sánchez =

Juan Carlos Sánchez may refer to:

- Juan Carlos Sánchez (footballer, born 1956), Bolivian football striker
- Juan Carlos Sánchez Montes de Oca (born 1964), Peruvian economist and politician
- Juan Carlos Sánchez (rapist) (born 1980), Colombian serial rapist and technologist
- Juan Carlos Sánchez (footballer, born 1985), Bolivian football defender
- Juan Carlos Sánchez (footballer, born 1987), Spanish football goalkeeper
- Juan Carlos Sánchez Jr. (born 1991), Mexican boxer

== See also ==
- Juan Sánchez (disambiguation)
