= Men in nursing =

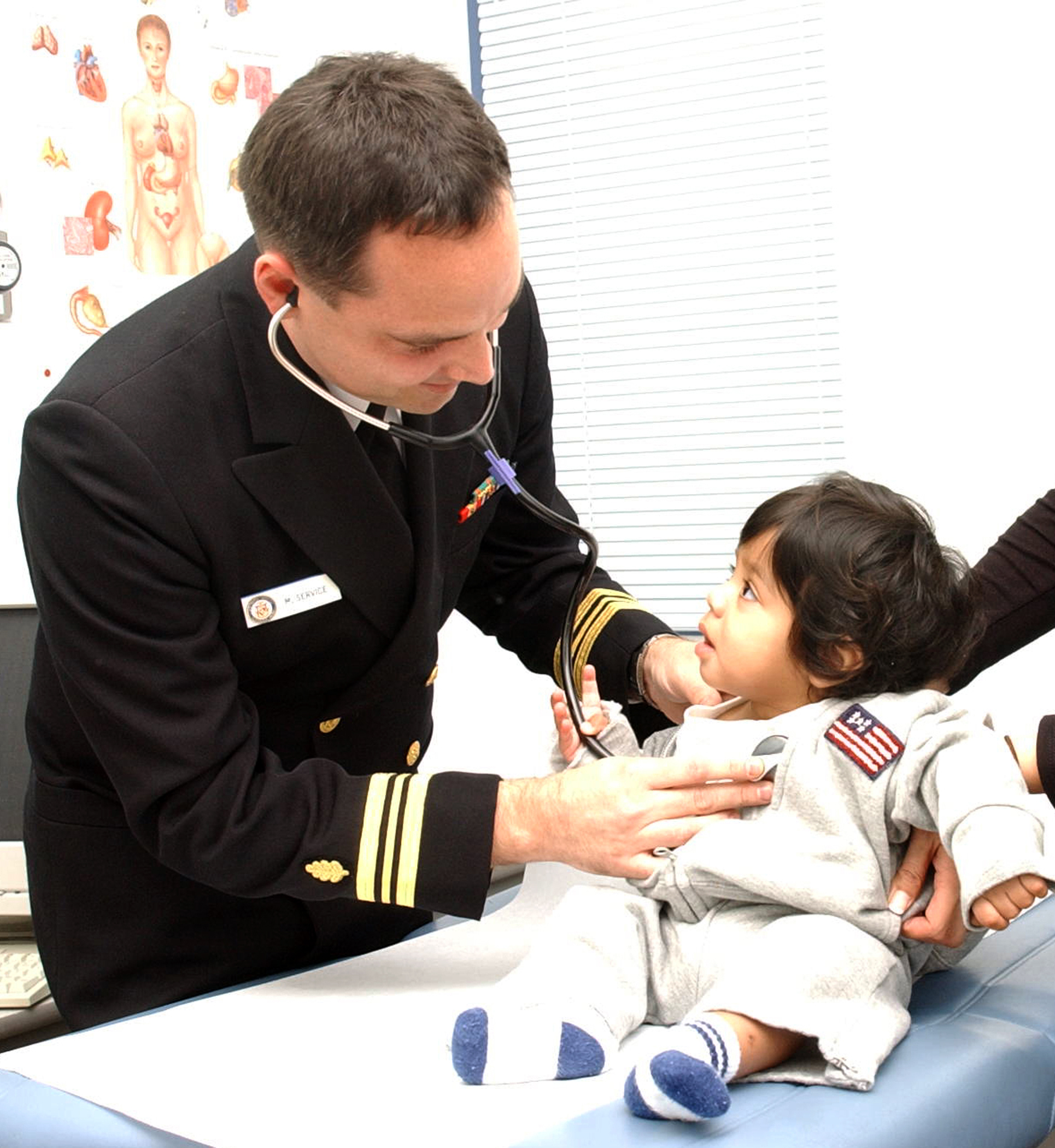
A U.S. Navy nurse attends to a child.

Nursing is a profession which is staffed disproportionately by women in most parts of the world. According to the World Health Organization's (WHO) 2020 State of the World's Nursing, approximately 10% of the worldwide nursing workforce is male. Since the 1960s, nursing has gradually become more gender-inclusive. The National Council of State Boards of Nursing (NCSBN) in the United States conducted a National Nursing Workforce Survey in 2020 and found that men represent 9.4% of registered nurses, compared to 9.1% in 2017, 8% in 2015, and 6.6% in 2013.

Men constituted around 9% of nurses in the United States in 2011, around 10% in the United Kingdom in 2016, around 6.4% in Canada in 2010. In Scandinavia, about 10% of nurses in Norway were men in 2022, with the same percentage in Sweden in 2016, and 4% in Denmark in 2023.

== History ==
While the current structure of the medical field does not directly translate to historical provision of care, there is a history of male presence in the caring of the sick and injured. The term nosocomial originates from the Greek Νοσος, nosos 'sickness' and Κομεω, komeo 'to care'. The word nosocomi was Latinized and was given to male caregivers, meaning that male nurses were prominent in Ancient Rome. During the plagues that swept through Europe, male nurses were also the primary caregivers. In the third century, men in the Parabolani brotherhood created a hospital and provided nursing care. The Codex Theodosianus of 416 (xvi, 2, 42) restricted the enrollment on male nurses in Alexandria to 500.

In the 14th century, the Alexian brothers existed as a Christian religious congregation with strong emphasis on care for the infirmed. Following a conversion to Christianity, John of God provided care for people who were both physically and mentally ill. He notably challenged the stigmas associated with mental illness. Later, he founded the Brothers Hospitallers of Saint John of God, which continues to care for patients to this day.

== Reasons for low representation ==
There are several reasons suggested for a low rates of nursing by males: stereotypes of nursing, lack of male interest in the profession, low pay, nursing job titles such as sister and matron, and the perception that male nurses will have difficulty in the workplace carrying out their duties. It is argued by the Chief Executive of the Royal College of Nursing that the "continuing stereotyping" of male nurses is the main reason for low intake. Studies have shown that low representation of male nurses is due to concerns that their touch when providing care would be misinterpreted and result in accusations of sexual inappropriateness. Another reason is lack of encouragement to pursue the occupation: men lack encouragement from other male nurses or nursing students because there are too few of them. Men also report that there are no other men in nursing classes, and at times are discouraged from participating in all student activities.

Men are not underrepresented in nursing in every country. A majority of nurses are male in many countries in Francophone Africa.

=== Efforts to increase representation ===
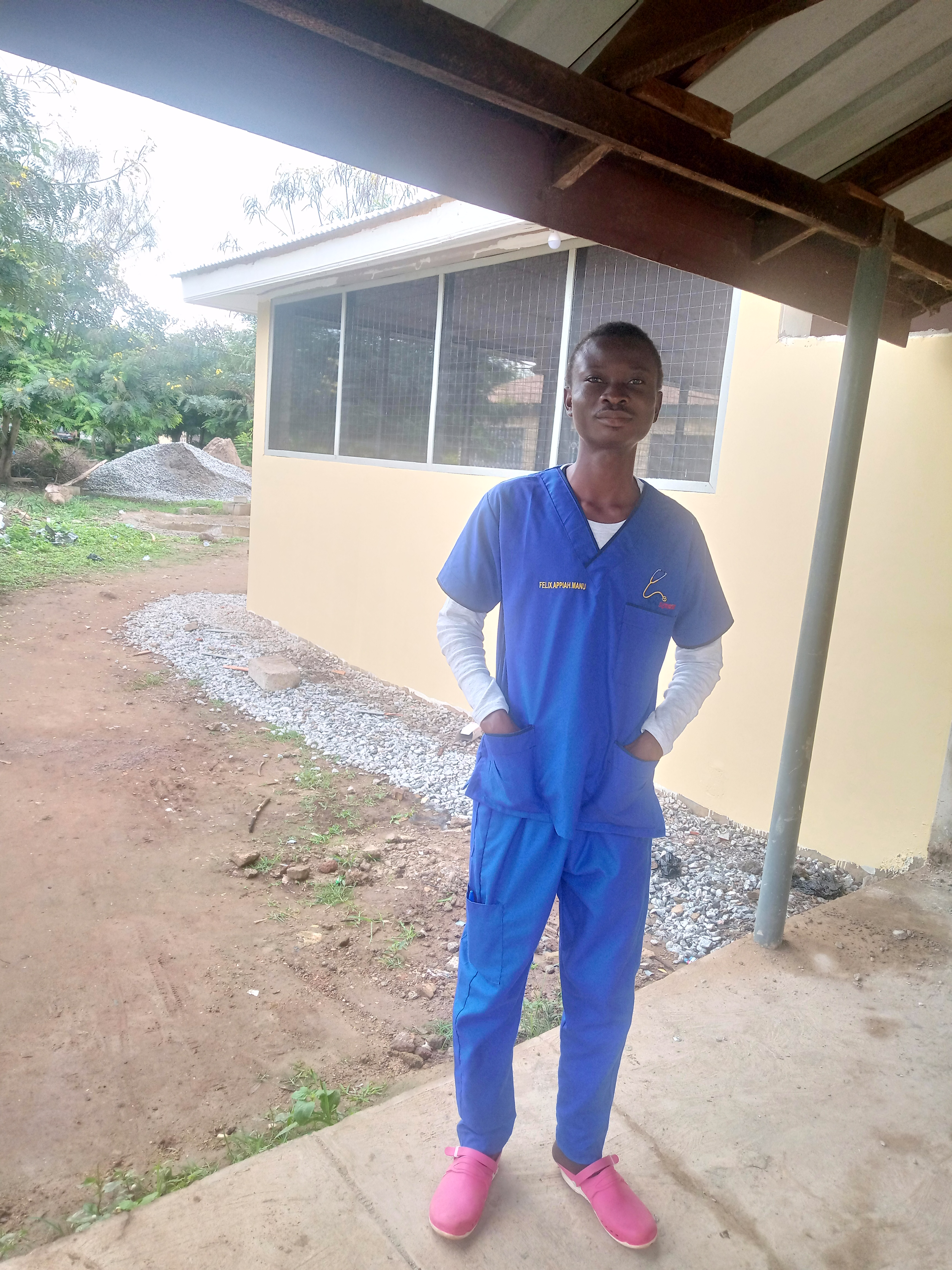
A male nurse from Ghana

Unlike the campaigns and groups set up to increase and promote women's opportunities in medicine, surgery, engineering and computer science, there have been no comparable campaigns to increase the number of males in nursing. One way to increase the rate of male nurses could be for nurse educators and nursing curriculum developers to enhance and promote a gender-neutral stance in nursing practice which reduces men in nursing being seen as unique. Another strategy could be to consider a professional title that is mutually accepted by both women and men in nursing, which can lead to reducing men as a gendered minority. Another way could be for schools to implement educational programs that increase cultural sensitivity, decrease stereotyping, develop skills for working in multicultural environments, and compare and contrast male and female communication styles.

In Northern Ireland, a campaign ran by Queen's University has been aimed at getting more males interested in nursing, with varying levels of success.

== Professional life ==
While there are low numbers of male nurses, no research thus far has indicated that they suffer in their career. Pay disparity results in male nurses earning more than their female counterparts, mainly from taking on more shifts and working overtime. Anecdotal evidence suggests that male nurses are more likely to be fast-tracked into management positions. Furthermore, a report into the role of men in nursing found there to be more focus on human caring amongst male nurses.

== Barriers and challenges for men in nursing ==
Men in the nursing profession often encounter physiological, social, and other barriers that affect their sense of belonging and overall success. Spearman conducted research by asking male nurses to answer questions based on these effects. Although the overall belongingness score was moderate (M = 123.61), several key reverse-scored items reveal that many male students still experience feelings of exclusion or discomfort. For example, item 22 (“I am uncomfortable attending social functions because I feel like I don’t belong”) and item 14 (“I feel like an outsider”) all had higher means than expected.

Men in nursing are very unrepresented in nursing programs. The percentage of nursing students who identify as men is around 13%, it has stayed the same since 2018 although the need for nurses has risen Research indicates that men in primarily female professions are more likely to report feelings of isolation, stereotyping and uncertainty of their role.

== Timelines ==
=== United Kingdom ===
The Society of Registered Male Nurses (1937-1967) affiliated with the RCN (Royal College of Nursing) from 1941 which enabled the first man to undertake an RCN nursing course.

After the Second World War, large numbers of male nurses moved into the workforce as they were demobilised after the war and had gained medical experience. In 1951 the male nurses joined the main nursing register.

In 2004 the percentage of male nurses was 10.63% and has increased to 10.69% in 2008, then to 11.4% in 2016.

In 2015 there were 103 male midwives on the Nursing and Midwifery Council (NMC) nursing register, compared to 31,189 women.

=== United States ===
In 2008, of the 3,063,163 licensed registered nurses in the United States only 6.6% were men. Men make up only 13% of all new nursing students.

Nursing schools for men were common in the United States until the early 1900s. More than half of those offering paid nursing services to the ill and injured were men. Yet by 1930, men constituted fewer than 1% of Registered Nurses (RNs) in the United States. As they found other, more lucrative occupations, they left nursing behind.

In 1955, the United States Congress revised the Army-Navy Nurses Act of 1947 to allow for the commissioning of men into military nursing corps.

The American Assembly for Men in Nursing (AAMN) was founded in 1971. The purpose of the AAMN is to provide a framework for nurses as a group to meet, discuss, and influence factors that affect men as nurses.

In Mississippi University for Women v. Hogan, 458 U.S. 718 (1982), the U.S. Supreme Court ruled 5–4 that Mississippi University for Women's single sex admissions policy for its nursing school violated the Fourteenth Amendment's Equal Protection Clause. Justice Sandra Day O'Connor wrote the landmark opinion.

== In popular culture ==
Many nurses portrayed in U.S. television and film are female, and equality advocates complain about the frequency with which nurses are used for sexual interest, are invisible to the story, or when heroic male doctors are portrayed performing functions that would realistically be performed by a nurse. A 2012 study of 13 male nurse characters in films found most were portrayed as incompetent, corrupt, effeminate, or homosexual.

- Joey Henderson (Shortland Street)
- Jack McFarland (Will & Grace)
- Peter Petrelli (Heroes)
- Charlie Fairhead (Casualty)
- Paul Flowers (Scrubs)
- Gaylord "Greg" Focker (Meet the Parents, Meet the Fockers, Little Fockers), criticized by many inclusion advocates as particularly unhelpful
- Sam, Mohammed de la Cruz, and Thor Lundgren (Nurse Jackie)
- Morgan Tookers (The Mindy Project)
- Rory Williams (Doctor Who)
- Martin Platt (Coronation Street)

== Notable men in nursing ==
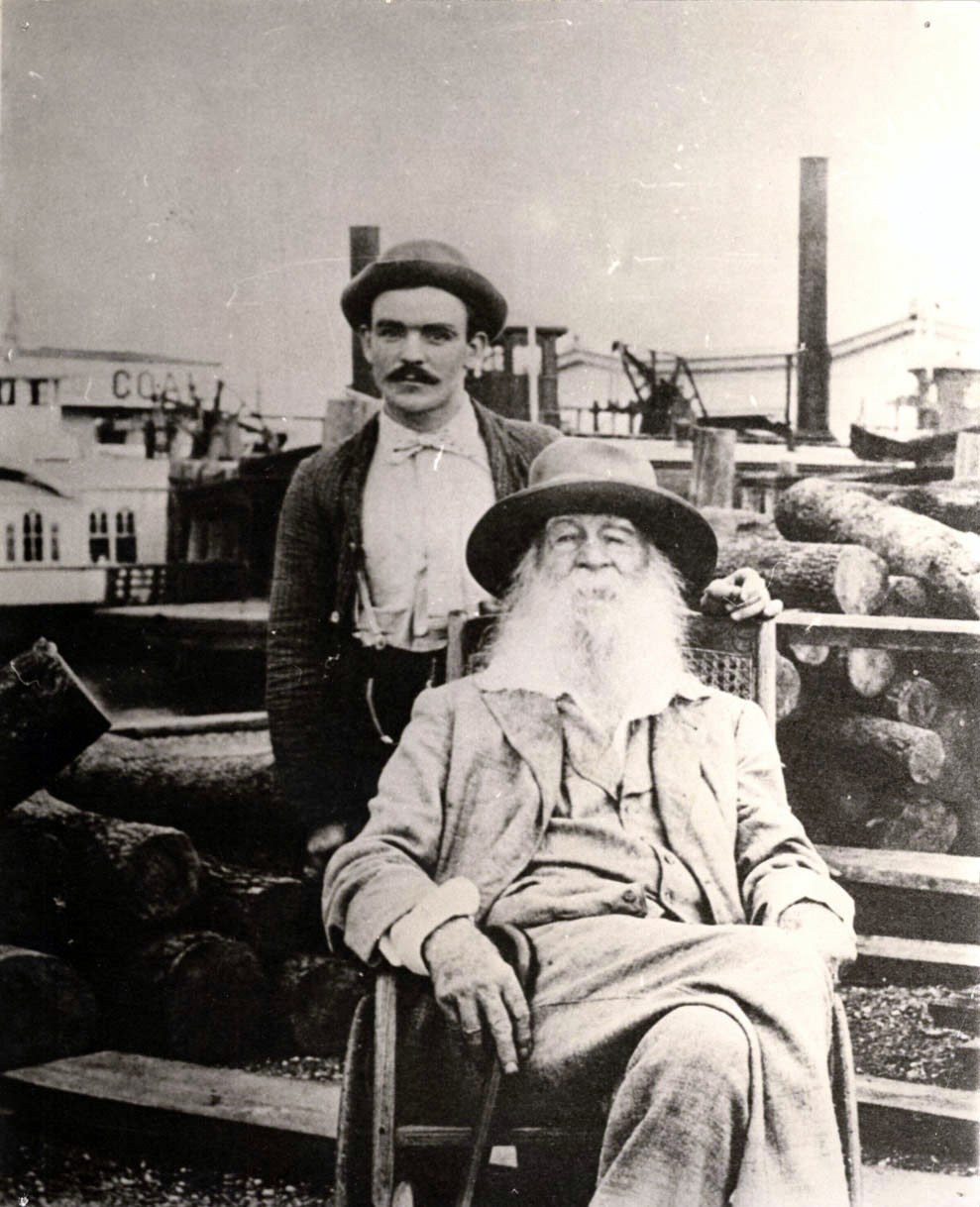
Walt Whitman and his male nurse Fritzenger (July 1890).

- Tom Ahrens: an American nurse, researcher and educator at Barnes-Jewish Hospital specializing in critical care nursing.
- Justus A. Akinsanya: nursing lecturer, academic and inventor of the Akinsanya model of bionursing.
- Richard Angelo: infamous serial killer.
- Jonathan Asbridge: the first president of the Royal College of Nursing.
- John Campbell
- Richard Carmona: nurse and subsequently Surgeon General.
- George Castledine
- Luther Christman
- Daniel Conahan
- Charles Cullen
- Keith Paora Curry
- James Derham
- Benjamin Geen
- Paul Genesse
- Hector Hugo Gonzalez
- Edson Izidoro Guimarães
- Billy Halop
- Carl O. Helvie
- John of God
- Matt Keeslar
- Camillus de Lellis
- Jim Lendall
- Stephan Letter
- Ted Maher
- Orville Lynn Majors
- Daisuke Mori
- Abasse Ndione
- Ian Norman
- Colin Norris
- Phillipe Nover
- José Olallo
- William Pooley: volunteer nurse who helped in the Ebola crisis.
- Tom Quinn
- John D. Thompson
- Rodger Watson
- Will Wikle
- Tom Willmott
- Walt Whitman: the American poet, essayist and journalist volunteered as a nurse during the American Civil War.
- Jimmie Thomas
- Andrew Younger

== See also ==
- Gender discrimination in the medical professions
- Gender role
- History of medicine
- Men in early childhood education
- Nurse stereotypes
- Nurse-client relationship
- Transcultural nursing
- Women in medicine
