= James Derham =

American physician

- Born: May 2, 1762; Philadelphia, Province of Pennsylvania
- Died: 1802?
- Known for: First African American physician

James Derham (also known as James Durham; May 2, 1762 – 1802?) was an American physician and emancipated slave who was the first African American to formally practice medicine in the United States. Despite practicing medicine he never received an M.D. degree.

== Biography ==
James Derham was born into slavery in Philadelphia in 1762. As a child, Derham was transferred to John Kearsley Jr., under whom Derham studied medicine. From Kearsley, Derham learned about compound medicine focusing on curing throat illnesses, as well as patient bedside manner. Upon Kearsley's death, Derham, then fifteen years old, was moved between several different enslavers before finally settling with George West, a surgeon for a British regiment during the American Revolutionary War. He was eventually transferred again, this time to New Orleans doctor Robert Dove. As an assistant at Dove's practice, Derham and Dove became friends, and Dove finally granted Derham his freedom. With some financial assistance from Dove, Derham opened a medical practice in New Orleans. In 1788, Derham and Benjamin Rush, a signatory of the United States Declaration of Independence, met each other in Philadelphia, and corresponded with one another for twelve years. Dr. Rush had been so impressed by Derham's paper on diphtheria that he read it before the College of Physicians of Philadelphia. During the yellow fever epidemic of 1789 in New Orleans, it is said that Derham "saved more yellow fever victims than any other physician," losing only 11 of 64 patients. Derham's final letter to Rush in 1802 is the last record of his existence. By 1789, his practice is reported to have made about $3,000 (approximately $81,072 in 2025) annually.It is believed that after the Spanish authorities restricted Derham to treating throat diseases in 1801, Derham left his practice in New Orleans.

== Derham in literature ==
W. E. B. Du Bois mentions Derham in his influential essay "The Talented Tenth":

"Then came Dr. James Derham, who could tell even the learned Dr. Rush something of medicine, and Lemuel Haynes, to whom Middlebury College gave an honorary A. M. in 1804. These and others we may call the Revolutionary group of distinguished Negroes - they were persons of marked ability, leaders of a Talented Tenth, standing conspicuously among the best of their time. They strove by word and deed to save the color line from becoming the line between the bond and free, but all they could do was nullified by Eli Whitney and the Curse of Gold. So they passed into forgetfulness."

== See also ==
- Jane Minor, an emancipated nurse
- Priscilla Baltimore, an emancipated midwife
- List of African-American firsts
- List of people who disappeared mysteriously (pre-1910)
- Men in nursing
