= Epifania Gil =

Venezuelan weaver (1914–2000)

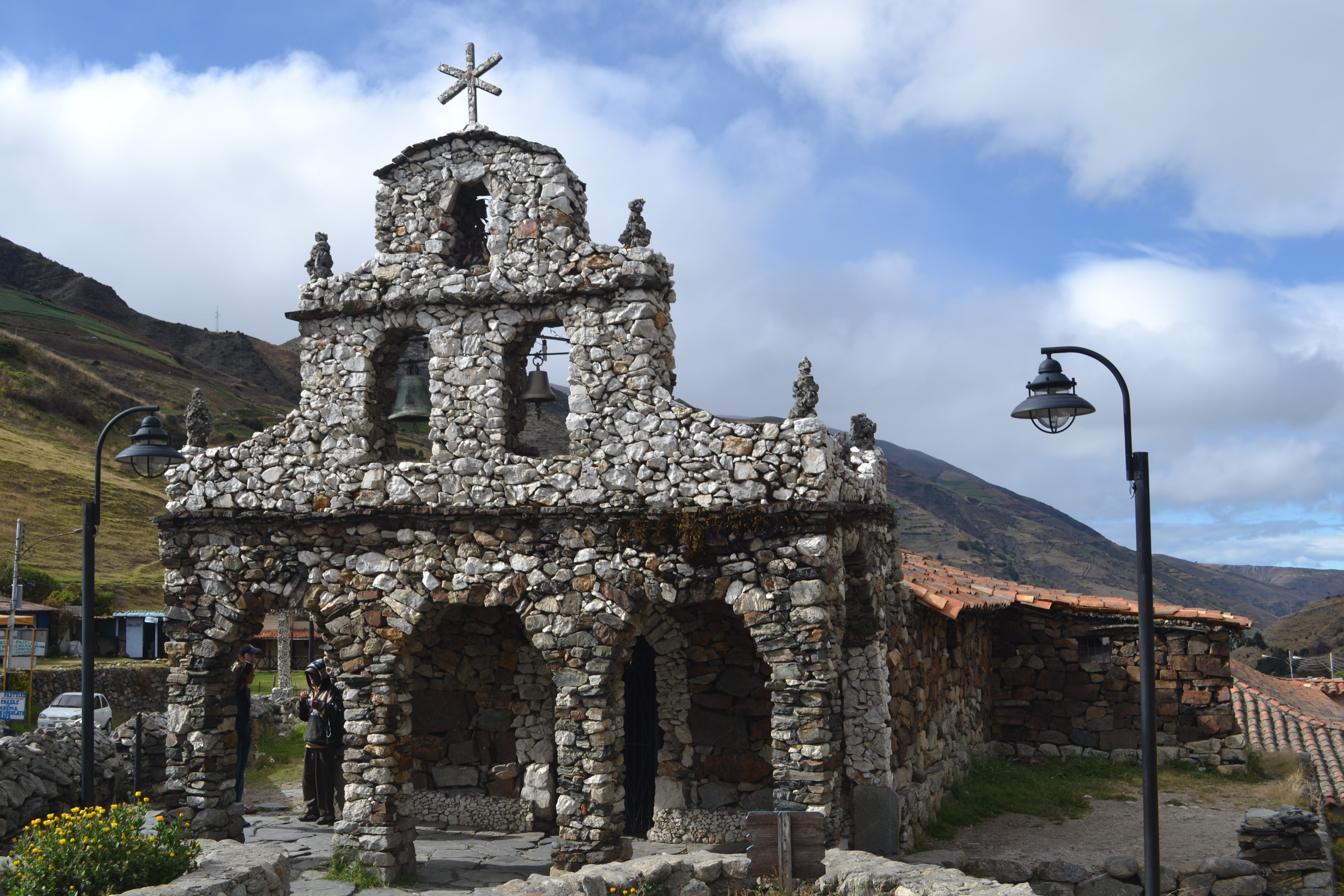
Chapel of San Rafael de Mucuchíes

María Epifania del Carmen Gil Dávila (April 7, 1914 – May 18, 2000), better known as Epifania Gil, was a Venezuelan weaver and the partner of architect and polymath Juan Félix Sánchez.

== Biography ==
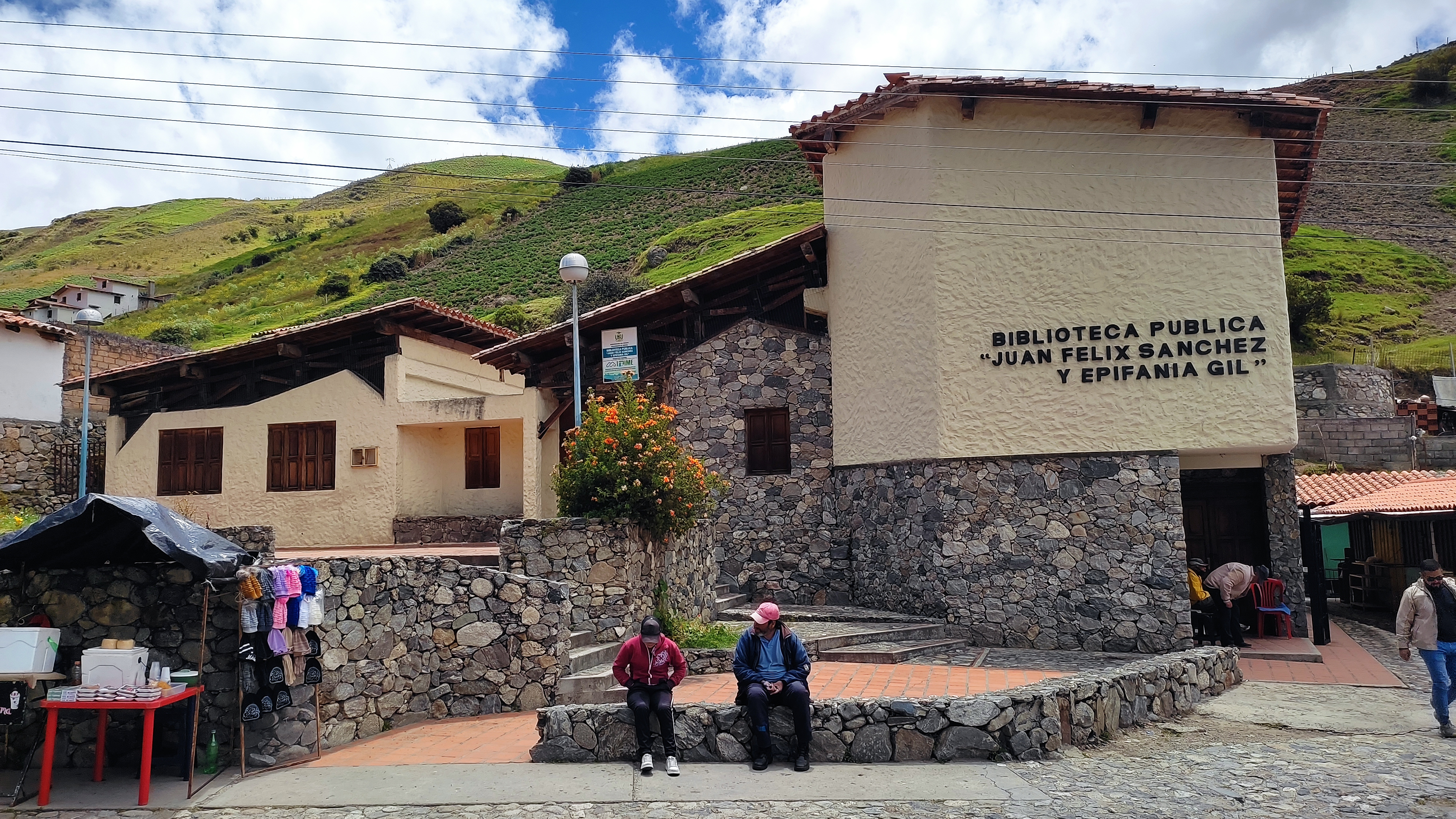
"Juan Félix Sánchez y Epifania Gil" Public Library

She learned the art of spinning raw wool from her mother, Isaína Dávila, and later taught this craft to Juan Félix. After the death of Juan Félix's mother, they moved to the Valle del Tisure in 1943, where they built a stone chapel. In San Rafael de Mucuchíes, they spent their final years, where together they built another stone chapel. In 1982, President Luis Herrera Campíns declared Sánchez's work national heritage. Epifania died in 2000 and is now buried alongside Sánchez in the stone Chapel of San Rafael de Mucuchíes.

Epifania has been the subject of university research at institutions such as the University of the Andes, due to her multidimensional role as a promoter and defender of the traditional cultural values of the páramo region. In 1999, the "Juan Félix Sánchez y Epifania Gil" Public Library was established in San Rafael de Mucuchíes.
