= Chris Pascal =

Co-director of the Centre for Research in Early Childhood (CREC)

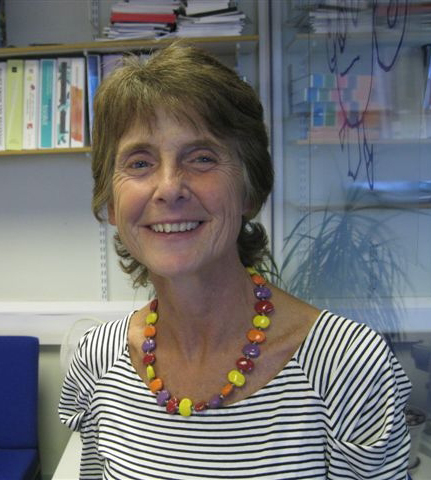
Professor Chris Pascal OBE

Christine Pascal (OBE) is a founding member of the European Early Childhood Education Research Association (EECERA) and is editor of the European Early Childhood Education Research Association Journal. She is co-director of the Centre for Research in Early Childhood (CREC), a charity based in Birmingham, and president of ECEERA.

== Career ==
Christine Pascal began her career as a teacher of infants in Birmingham after completing a PGCE at Warwick University. Following this, she became a senior lecturer in Education at University of Worcester and a tutor for the Open University. In 1990, Pascal set up the EECERA with her colleagues and currently serves as president of the organisation. In 2000, Pascal became the Vice President of leading early years charity British Association of Early Childhood Education (BAECE). In 2007, she established the charitable trust CREC alongside Bertram, where she now acts as honorary co-director.

Pascal is an Honorary Professor at Birmingham City University and the University of Wolverhampton and is Honorary Senior Research Fellow at the University of Birmingham. She has been a Specialist Adviser for Early Years to the House of Commons Select Committee on Education and Skills. Pascal is former President and current Vice President of BAECE and London Early Years Foundation. She is also a member of the Early Education Advisory Group, which advises the Minister for Children and Families.

== Research and publications ==
Pascal has pioneered many national and international research projects, including the Effective Early Learning Programme, the Accounting Early for Life Long Learning Programme and the Children Crossing Borders Project. She also contributed to the OECD's Review ‘Starting Strong'.

== Publications ==
Pascal has authored a range of books focusing on early years education, including:

- CONKBAYIR M and PASCAL C (2014 forthcoming) A Practical Introduction to Key Early Childhood Theories, Bloomsbury Publishing: London
- PASCAL C and RIBBINS P (1998) Understanding Primary Headteachers, Cassell Press, London.
- PASCAL C and BERTRAM A.D. (Eds) (1997), Effective Early Learning: Case Studies of Improvement, Hodder and Stoughton, London.
- PASCAL C and BERTRAM A D (1997) Action Plans: A Guide for Private and Independent Providers of Nursery Education, DfEE: London.
- PASCAL C and BERTRAM A.D. (1996) Desenvolvendo Qualidade em Parcerias. Porto Editora, Lisboa,
- PASCAL C (1990) Under Fives in Infant Classrooms, Trentham Press, Stoke on Trent.

== Co-authored chapters in books ==
Pascal has also authored chapters in various books, including:

- PASCAL C and BERTRAM T (2013 forthcoming) ‘Small voices, powerful messages: capturing young children’s perspectives in practice-led research’ in Hammersley M, Flewett R, Robb M and Clark A (2013) ‘Issues in Research with Children and Young People’, Sage Publications/Open University Press: Milton Keynes.
- PASCAL C and BERTRAM T (2011) ‘Making Sense of Theory and Practice in Early Childhood’, Forward in WALLER T, WHITMARSH J and CLARK K (eds) (2011), Making Sense of Theory and Practice in Early Childhood: The Power of Ideas, Open University Press: Milton Keynes.
- PASCAL C and BERTRAM T (2009) Introducing Child Development, in BRUCE T (Ed), Early Childhood, Second Edition, Sage Publications, London.
- PASCAL, C and BERTRAM, A D (2006) ‘Introducing Child Development’ in BRUCE T (Ed) Early Childhood: A guide for students, Sage Publications, London.
- BERTRAM, A.D. and PASCAL, C. (2005), Early Excellence Centres: een van geintegreede zorg, in VANDENBROECK, M. (ed), Pedagogisch Management in de kinderopvang, SWP, Amsterdam pp. 173–184
- PASCAL C and BERTRAM A D (2003) The Quality of Adult Engagement in Early Childhood Settings in the UK, in LAEVERS F and HEYLEN L (Eds) Involvement of Children and Teacher Style: Insights from an International study of Experiential Education, Leuven University Press, Leuven.
- PASCAL, C and BERTRAM, A D (2002) Laying the Foundations for Learning, in FISHER J (Ed) Building Firm Foundations in the Early Years, Open University Press, London.
- PASCAL, C and BERTRAM, A D (2002) What Counts in Early Learning? in SPODEK B and SARACHO O (Eds) Issues in Early Childhood Curriculum: Yearbook in Early Childhood Education Vol 10, Teachers College Press, USA.
- BERTRAM A D and PASCAL C, (2000) Evaluating and Improving Early Childhood Settings, in Okuno M & Spodek B (Eds) Keynotes of the Inaugural Pacific Early Childhood Education Research Association, Kobe University Press, Japan
- PASCAL C and BERTRAM A D (2000) ‘Accounting Early for Life Long Learning’ in ABBOTT L and MOYLETT H (Eds) Shaping the Future: Early Education Reformed, Falmer Press, London.

== Awards and honours ==
- She was awarded the OBE in 2013 for her services to early years education.
- Pascal won the Nursery World Lifetime Achievement award in 2012.
