= JAMA Pediatrics =

- Discipline: Pediatrics
- Language: English
- Edited by: Dimitri A. Christakis

Publication details
- Former name(s): Archives of Pediatrics & Adolescent Medicine, American Journal of Diseases of Children
- History: 1911–present
- Publisher: American Medical Association (United States)
- Frequency: Monthly
- Impact factor: 24.7 (2023)

Standard abbreviations
- ISO 4: JAMA Pediatr.

Indexing
- JAMA Pediatrics
- CODEN: APAMEB
- ISSN: 2168-6203 (print); 2168-6211 (web)
- LCCN: 95642320
- OCLC no.: 28958056
- American Journal of Diseases of Children
- ISSN: 0096-8994
- A.M.A. American Journal of Diseases of Children
- ISSN: 2374-2941
- Archives of Pediatrics & Adolescent Medicine
- ISSN: 1072-4710

Links
- Journal homepage; Online access; Online archives

JAMA Pediatrics is a monthly peer-reviewed medical journal published by the American Medical Association. It covers all aspects of pediatrics. The journal was established in 1911 as the American Journal of Diseases of Children and renamed in 1994 to Archives of Pediatrics & Adolescent Medicine, before obtaining its current title in 2013.

The journal's founding editor-in-chief in 1911 was Abraham Jacobi. The articles in that first volume of the journal were mostly observational studies focused on the major causes of illness and death in children at the start of the 20th century.

The current editor-in-chief is Dimitri A. Christakis (University of Washington). According to Journal Citation Reports, the journal's 2023 impact factor is 24.7, ranking it 1st in the category "Pediatrics".

== Naming history ==
JAMA Pediatrics – historical name changes
Title	Year	ISSN
JAMA Pediatrics	2013–	2168-6211
Archives of Pediatrics & Adolescent Medicine	1994–2012	1072-4710
American Journal of Diseases of Children (1960)	1960–1993	0002-922X
A.M.A. Journal of Diseases of Children	1956–1960	0096-6916
A.M.A. American Journal of Diseases of Children	1950–1955	0096-8994
American Journal of Diseases of Children (1911)	1911–1950	0096-8994

== Abstracting and indexing ==
The journal is abstracted and indexed in Index Medicus/MEDLINE/PubMed.

== See also ==
- List of American Medical Association journals
