= Mother Goose Club =

American children's educational TV program and YouTube Channel by Sockeye Media LLC

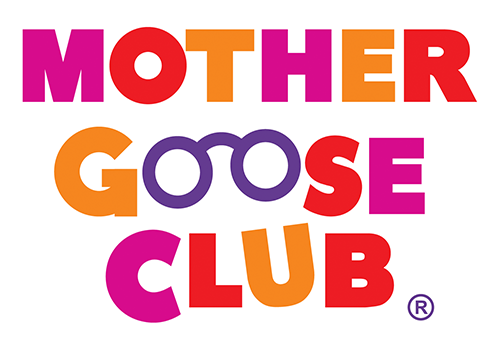

YouTube information
- Channels: Mother Goose Club; MGC Playhouse; See full list
- Years active: 2009–present
- Genres: Preschool; Educational
- Subscribers: 31.33 million (combined)
- Views: 32.15 billion (combined)
- Last updated: March 2024
- Website: mothergooseclub.com

Mother Goose Club
- Created by: Harry Jho; Sona Jho
- Written by: Christina Aprea; Livia Beasely; Ryan Dudenbostel; Sona Jho
- Directed by: John Hussey
- Starring: Blasina Rowe; Roman Engle; Rachel Ling Gordon; Robin August Fritsch; Jessica Diaz; Rachel Hockett; Joseph Lopez; Bailey Ramirez; Liam Remick; Ivy Rhodes; Arthur Wawrzyniak
- Country of origin: United States
- Original language: English

Production
- Running time: 1–30 minutes
- Production company: Sockeye Media LLC

Original release
- Network: YouTube
- Release: June 29, 2009 – present

Mother Goose Club is an educational nursery school program that streams on its eponymous YouTube channel and is produced by Sockeye Media LLC. Its YouTube channel has acquired more than 8 billion views and 7 million subscribers since 2009. Episodes of the program have also aired on PBS stations. The show is made up of a series of educational live-action and animated segments, with a cast of six main characters who introduce classic nursery rhymes and other songs to children through catchy tunes, play, and interactive lessons.

== Content ==
Each episode of Mother Goose Club contains multiple segments and follows a cast of six main characters—Baa Baa Sheep, Eep the Mouse, Little Bo Peep, Jack B. Nimble, Mary Quite Contrary, and Teddy Bear—who sing and dance to a variety of nursery rhymes and original songs. The live-action characters often perform in front of animated backdrops, although some sequences of the show feature fully-animated CGI versions of the cast. Episodes also often feature sketch-like segments that have narrative elements. The program's emphasis on words is designed to help young children learn early language skills, while rhymes and melodies encourage song participation and physical movement. The show also focuses on other early learning concepts such as letters, colors, and shape recognition.

The Mother Goose Club YouTube channel also contains a number of shorter, song-only videos that feature cast members and other performers singing nursery rhymes. Additional content can be found on the Mother Goose Club mobile app in the form of songs, books, games, and videos and on Netflix in the form of a nursery rhyme compilation. Sockeye Media also operates and produces content for associated YouTube channels including Mother Goose Club Playhouse and a Spanish-language version of the channel known as Mother Goose Club en Español.

== History ==
The show was created by educators and parents of four, Harry Jho and Sona Jho of Sockeye Media. Mother Goose Club videos were initially uploaded to YouTube for the purpose of sharing content with industry professionals but developed an unexpectedly large following among the general population. By 2011, Mother Goose Club had inadvertently become one of the largest YouTube kids' channels in the world. Episodes also appeared on PBS stations nationwide, and in DVD compilations. In 2015, the Mother Goose Club channel was among the first content creators to appear on the YouTube Kids mobile app.

By 2016, a compilation of Mother Goose Club episodes had been licensed to Netflix. Beginning that year, Sockeye Media started presenting the Mother Goose Club series at both MIPCOM and MIPJunior, international conferences that bring together entertainment content players worldwide. It also announced a partnership with Foothill Entertainment on a new 52-episode, CGI-animated Mother Goose Club series. Each episode would be 11 minutes long and feature a story-driven narrative. The series went into development in 2018.

In 2017, Sockeye Media, together with developer Story Toys Entertainment (now Touch Press Inc.), created an app that brought Mother Goose Club books, videos, and games to iOS mobile devices. In June of that year, Sockeye Media announced its partnership with DHX Media's online kids' network WildBrain for managing Mother Goose Club's YouTube channels and handling paid media campaigns. The deal aims to increase audiences and ad revenue by providing rights management and access to technical support.

In December 2019, Mother Goose Club episodes were added to the library of AVOD provider, Kidoodle.TV. In November 2020, it was announced that Mother Goose Club content would be available on the upcoming interactive children's app and streaming service, Hellosaurus. The app would allow children to interact directly with "gamified" episodes of the show. Mother Goose Club was also announced as a content producer for the upcoming kid-focused streaming app, Sensical, developed by Common Sense Media.

== Reception and awards ==
Across multiple channels on YouTube, Mother Goose Club has accumulated over 22 million subscribers and 21 billion views. Individual videos on its channels have also attained hundreds of millions of views. The show and its producer, Sockeye Media, have won or been nominated for numerous awards, including the following:

Year	Award	Category	Nominee	Result	Ref.
2012	26th Midsouth Emmy Awards	Best Set Design	Mother Goose Club	Won	
2012	26th Midsouth Emmy Awards	Best Informational/Instructional Program	Mother Goose Club episode "One, Two, Buckle My Shoe"	Won	
2012	26th Midsouth Emmy Awards	Best Director/Program	John Hussey for Mother Goose Club	Nominated	
2014	28th Midsouth Emmy Awards	Best Interstitials	Mother Goose Club episode "The Bunny Hop"	Won	
2016	30th Midsouth Emmy Awards	Best Children's Program	Mother Goose Club	Won	
2018	32nd Midsouth Emmy Awards	Best Director/Short Form	John Hussey for Mother Goose Club episode "A Day At The Beach"	Nominated	
2019	33rd Midsouth Emmy Awards	Best Informational/Instructional Series	Mother Goose Club	Nominated	
2019	33rd Midsouth Emmy Awards	Best Interstitials	Mother Goose Club	Nominated	
2019	2019 Telly Awards	Online General-Education (Silver Winner)	Mother Goose Club episode "The Alphabet Hip-Hop"	Won	
2019	2019 Telly Awards	Online Craft-Use of Animation (Silver Winner)	Mother Goose Club episode "ABC Dance With Me"	Won	

== YouTube channels ==
Channel name	Topic	Release date	Subscribers	Number of videos
Mother Goose Club	Nursery rhyme music videos and skits performed by the six live-action characters of the MGC world	July 19, 2009	9.3 million	1500
MGC Playhouse	Nursery rhyme music videos and skits performed by a cast of real kids and adults	June 29, 2009	17.8 million	1500
Mother Goose Club Toons	2D and 3D animated nursery rhymes music videos featuring the animated characters of the MGC world	January 2, 2018	934 thousand	864
MGC Let's Play	Let's Play-style video game content played by the Mother Goose Club characters	December 12, 2016	339 thousand	1000
MGC Schoolhouse	Education-forward live-action and animated music videos and teaching videos for early learners	August 29, 2017	466 thousand	689
Mother Goose Club Lullaby	Sleepy time lullaby music in a wide variety of musical styles	March 30, 2020	361 thousand	412
MGC Funhouse	Skits, stories and playtime videos performed by a cast of real kids and adults	March 6, 2018	1.63 million	834
Mother Goose Club Finger Family	Finger Family nursery rhyme songs featuring 2D animated character families	February 14, 2018	450 thousand	474
Show Me How	Tips and tricks for caregivers and parents to engage in educational and creative play at home	December 14, 2014	16.3 thousand	361
Mother Goose Club en Español	Mother Goose Club videos localized in Spanish	March 2, 2017	2.51 million	761
兒歌童謠・卡通動畫	Mother Goose Club videos localized in Mandarin	July 29. 2022	5.25 thousand	141
