= Juan Félix Sánchez =

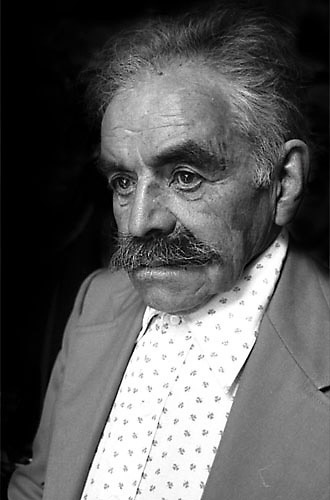
- Juan Félix Sánchez in San Rafael de Mucuchíes (undated)
- Born: May 16, 1900; San Rafael de Mucuchíes, Mérida, Venezuela
- Died: April 18, 1997 (aged 96); Mérida, Venezuela
- Known for: Weaving, sculpture, folk architecture
- Notable work: Chapel of San Rafael de Mucuchíes, chapels at El Tisure
- Style: Andean folk art
- Movement: Vernacular architecture, traditional Andean art
- Elected: President of the Communal Meeting of San Rafael (1929–1933)

Juan Félix Sánchez (16 May 1900 – 18 April 1997) was Andean folk artist born in San Rafael de Mucuchíes, Mérida, Venezuela. Sánchez' talents included weaving and sculpture, and he was also the architect and builder of the San Rafael de Mucuchíes, dedicated to the Our Lady of Coromoto at El Tisure, as well as several other small chapels.

While President of the Communal Meeting of San Rafael in 1929 - 1933, he organised the installation of a turbine to provide electricity to the town.

In the 1980s, he was the subject of a short film designed to "acknowledge and uncover the land, the beauty and the people of Venezuela" which received several awards.

== Pictures ==
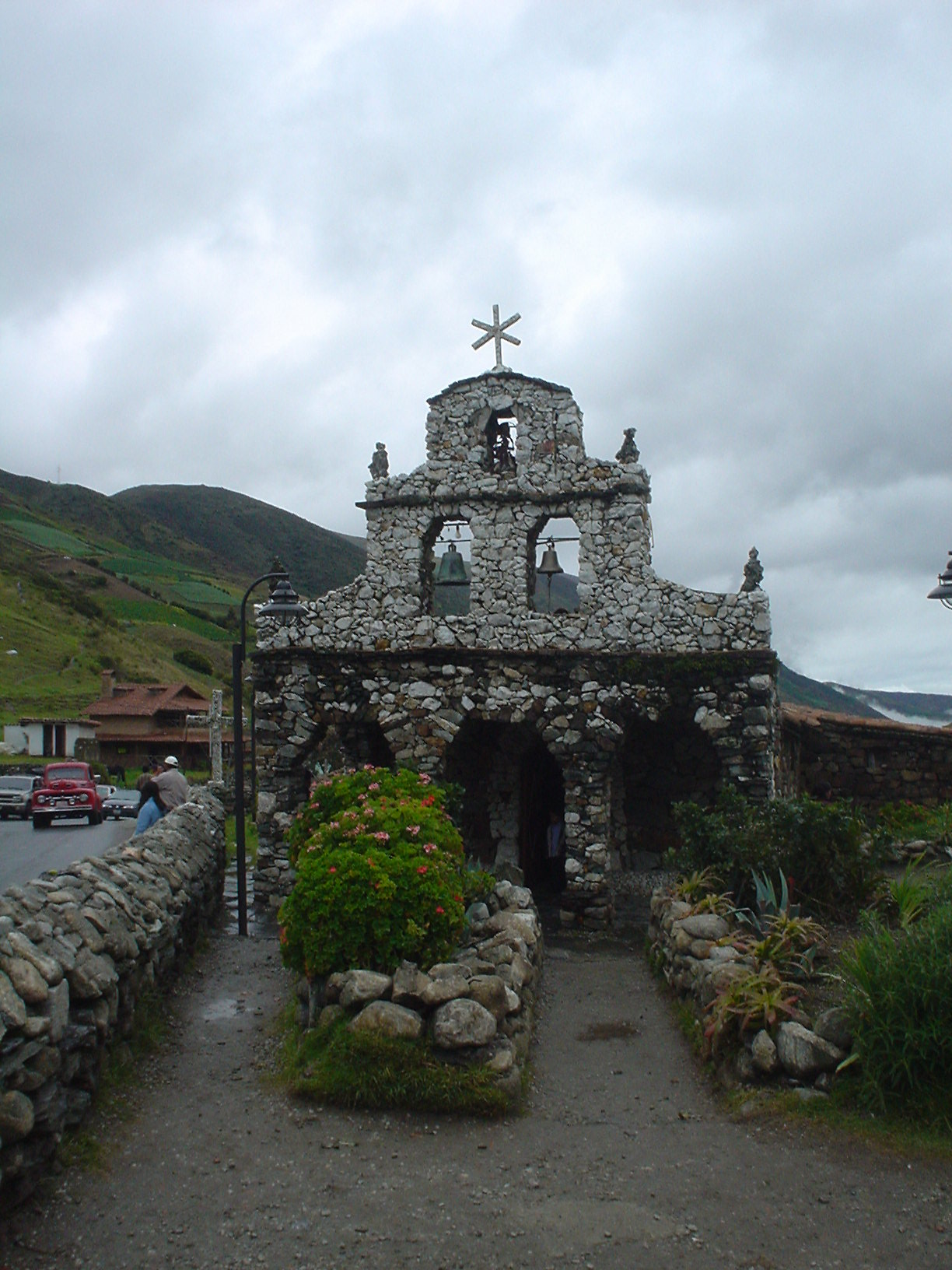
Chapel of San Rafael de Mucuchíes

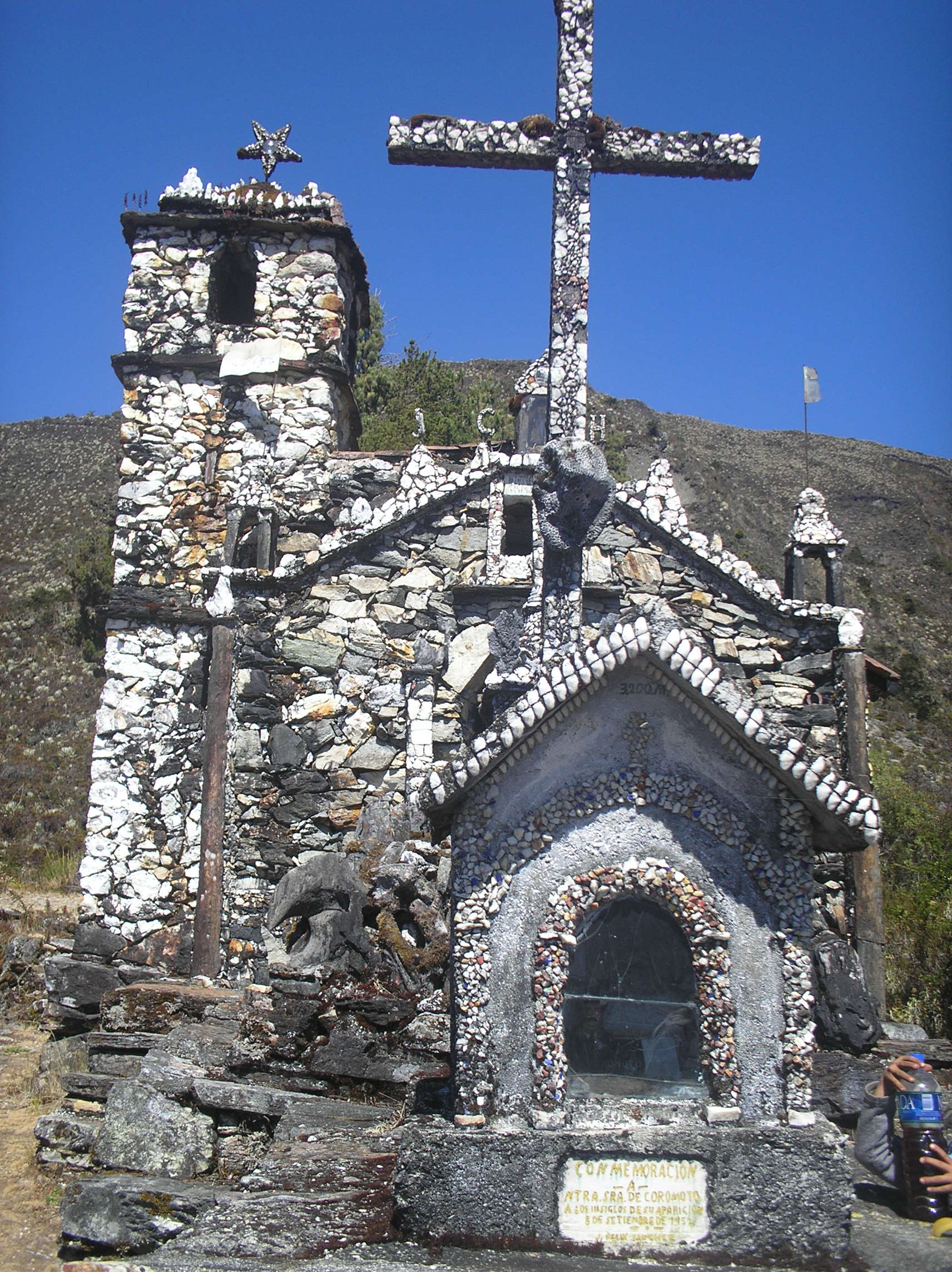
Capilla del Tisure, construída por Juan Félix y Epifania Gil, vista desde el frente

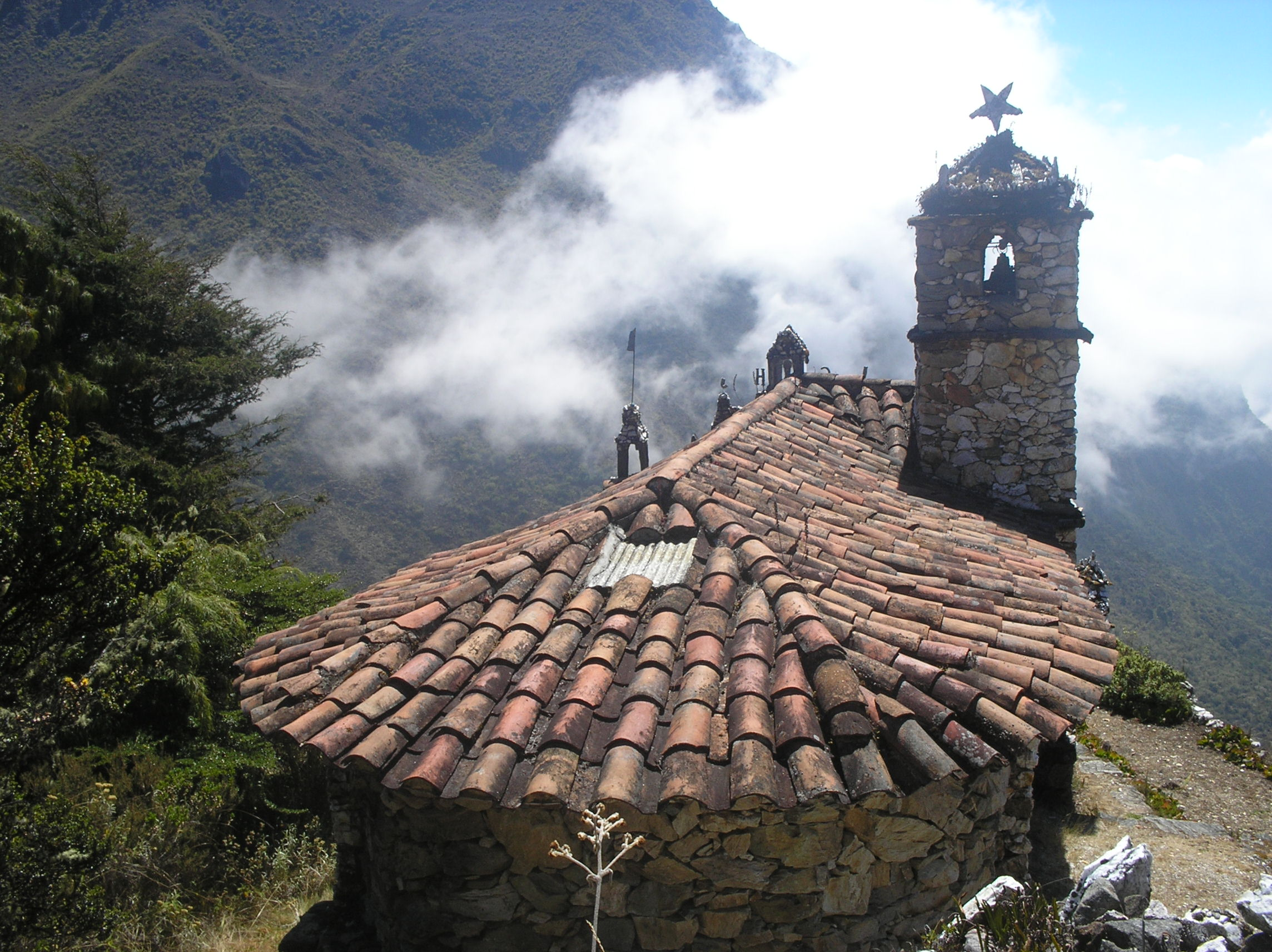
Capilla del Tisure, vista desde atrás.

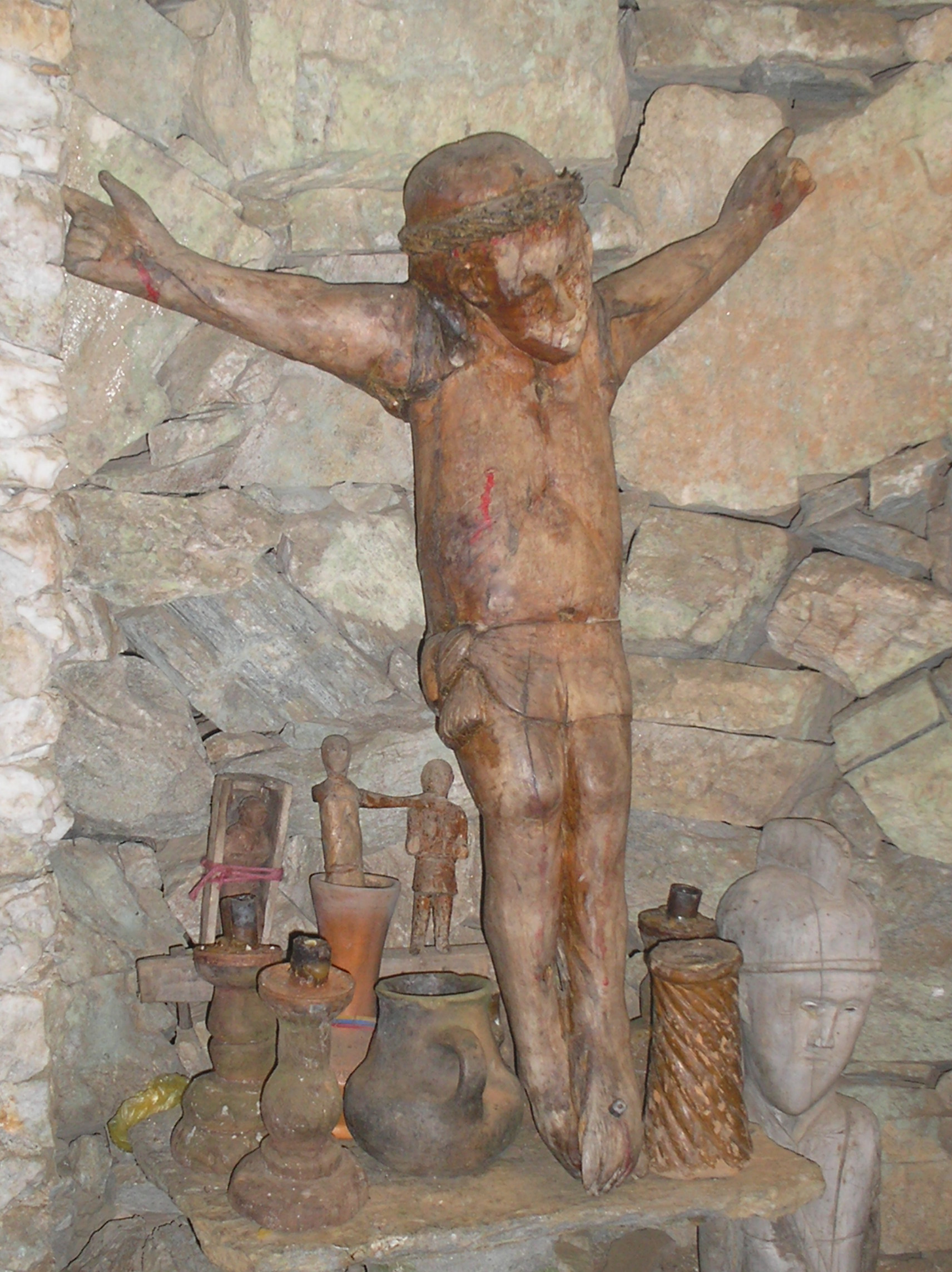
Wood Sculpture, of Christ, by Juan Félix.

== See also ==
- National Prize of Plastic Arts of Venezuela
- Epifania Gil
