= Juan Sánchez Vidal =

Spanish airplane model collector and airline employee (born 1953)

Juan Sánchez Vidal (born January 3, 1958) is a model aircraft collector. Sánchez Vidal, born in the Palma de Mallorca, has over one thousand commercial airline models, a collection which many experts believe to be the largest aircraft collection in the world.

== Life and hobby ==
Sánchez Vidal was born near Son Bonet. At the age of fifteen, Sánchez Vidal began working at Son Sant Joan Airport. He retired from that job in 2020.

Sánchez Vidal began working with defunct Spanish airline Spantax, acquiring his first model, a Convair CV-990 of that airline, in 1973. He made friendships with co-workers of other airlines, and he began receiving more models. Rodolfo Bay, then president of Spantax, personally gave Sánchez Vidal an airplane model.

Eventually, his hobby led him to meet some more airline personalities, some of them famous celebrities, like Niki Lauda, Formula One champion and owner of Lauda Air. The largest model in his collection, a model of an Air France Airbus A320, was obtained after he traded one of his planes with a local Air France worker who also collected models. He also made a McDonnell Douglas MD-11 model of Air Europa, airline for which he then worked. Air Europa never actually used this type of aircraft in real life.

He also has models of American Airlines' Boeing 757 and Boeing 767, the same type of aircraft used for the September 11, 2001 attacks.

Sánchez Vidal and his collection have been the objects of many reports and interviews by many specialized magazines.

In 2000, personnel at Barajas International Airport in Madrid negotiated with Sánchez Vidal so that he could display his collection at the international arrivals terminal of that airport. In March of that year, his collection began being showcased at that airport. The collection lasted there until 2003. He had also held an exhibition of his models at Son Sant Joan Airport, in 1987.

Sanchez Vidal is fluent in Spanish and Catalan.

== See also ==
- List of Spaniards
