= Luther Christman =

American nursing professor and administrator (1915–2011)

Luther P. Christman
- Christman in 1980
- Born: February 26, 1915; Summit Hill, Pennsylvania
- Died: June 7, 2011 (aged 96); Nashville, Tennessee
- Education: Michigan State University; Philadelphia Psychoanalytic Institute; Temple University
- Scientific career
- Fields: Registered nurse University professor Administrator
- Workplaces: University of Michigan; Vanderbilt University; Rush University
- Notable students: Courtney Lyder

Luther Parmalee Christman (February 26, 1915 – June 7, 2011) was an American nurse, professor of nursing, university administrator and advocate for gender and racial diversity in nursing. His career included service with the Michigan Department of Mental Health and academic posts at the University of Michigan, Vanderbilt University and Rush University. In 1967, Christman became the first man to hold the position of dean at a nursing school.

While serving as vice president for nursing affairs at Rush-Presbyterian-St. Luke's Medical Center, Christman implemented the Rush Model of Nursing, an influential model for delivering hospital nursing services. He was involved in the founding of the National Male Nurse Association, which later became the American Assembly for Men in Nursing. After his 1987 retirement, Christman received several awards and honors for his contributions to nursing. He died in Nashville, Tennessee, in 2011.

== Education ==
Christman earned a diploma from the Pennsylvania Hospital School of Nursing for Men in 1939. He received an undergraduate degree from Temple University in 1948, then an Ed.M. degree in clinical psychology from the Philadelphia Psychoanalytic Institute. He completed a Ph.D. from Michigan State University, where he studied anthropology and sociology. Christman overcame gender discrimination during his own education; he was refused admission to two university nursing programs because he was male. While he was a nursing student, he was denied a maternity clinical rotation for the same reason.

== Career ==
Christman said that he faced hostility from female coworkers early in his career, and he said that night shift positions in psychiatric nursing and urology were virtually the only openings for men. Christman was denied admission to the U.S. Army Nurse Corps on the basis of his gender; instead, he served in the United States Maritime Service as a pharmacist's mate during World War II. After returning from the war, Christman worked as a private duty nurse and assistant head nurse at Pennsylvania Hospital. After completing his Ed.M., he became director of nursing at Yankton State Hospital in South Dakota.

In 1956, Christman went to work for the Michigan Department of Mental Health. In that position, he coordinated nursing school training at hospitals in the state. Christman was named associate professor of psychiatric nursing at the University of Michigan in 1963. In 1967, he assumed a dual role as nursing school dean at Vanderbilt University and director of nursing at Vanderbilt University Medical Center. In 1972, he took on similar responsibilities at Rush University and Rush-Presbyterian-St. Luke's Medical Center. While Christman was at Rush, the school and hospital implemented the Rush Model of Nursing. The model highlighted the importance of clinical expertise among faculty members, which was similar to the established practice in medicine. His faculty practice model required that nursing professors spend most of their time in clinical practice. He retired in 1987.

During his career, Christman advocated for the advancement of nursing education. In the late 1960s, Christman predicted increased specialization in the next generation of nurses; he advocated for nurses to be freed of non-clinical tasks so that they could keep up with the nursing demands in an increasingly technological environment. In a 1978 presentation in Australia, he argued against systems which utilized a combination of registered nurses, nurse aides and student nurses; he highlighted statistics which showed that nurse aides were unoccupied up to 25 percent of the typical work day. Christman served multiple terms as president of the Michigan Nurses Association and he proposed the idea that led to the founding of the American Academy of Nursing.

== Awards and honors ==
Christman won two awards from Sigma Theta Tau: the Edith Moore Copeland Founders Award for Creativity (1981) and the Lifetime Distinguished Achievement Award (1991; first recipient). He was named a Living Legend of the American Academy of Nursing in 1995 and inducted into the American Nurses Association Hall of Fame in 2004.

In 1975, the American Assembly for Men in Nursing established the Luther Christman Award. The award recognizes "the contributions to nursing made by men, funds scholarships for men in nursing, and research for men’s health and issues specific to men in nursing." In 2007, the American Nurses Association introduced a separate Luther Christman Award which "recognizes the significant contribution an individual man has made to the nursing profession." Luther was designated a Living Legend by the American Academy of Nursing in 1995.

== Later life ==
After his retirement, Christman remained an active participant in nursing organizations for many years. He died of pneumonia on June 7, 2011, in Nashville. He was predeceased by his wife, Dorothy Black, in 2003. They had married in 1939 and had three children.

== Selected works ==
- Christman, Luther (November 1, 1965). "Nurse-Physician Communications in the Hospital". Journal of the American Medical Association. 194 (5): 539–544. doi:10.1001/jama.1965.03090180063015. PMID 5897365.
- Christman, Luther (October 1967). "Nursing Leadership - Style and Substance". American Journal of Nursing. 67 (10): 2091–2093. PMID 5182466.
- Christman, Luther (May 1970). "The Clinical Nurse Specialist: A Role Model". American Journal of Nursing. 70 (5): 1030–1039. PMID 5198686.
- Christman, Luther (October 1974). "On The Horizon: The All-R.N. Nursing Staff". Nursing Digest. 2 (8).
- Christman, Luther (March–April 1979). "The Practitioner-Teacher". Nurse Educator. 4 (2): 8–11. doi:10.1097/00006223-197903000-00008. PMID 253937.

== See also ==
- List of nurses
- List of Living Legends of the American Academy of Nursing
