= Bright from the Start =

Bright from the Start, also known as Georgia Department of Early Care and Learning, was established on July 1, 2004. The main office is located in downtown Atlanta, Georgia. The department licenses and monitors daycare centers and all state funded pre-k. Bright from the Start is headed by one commissioner and by a board of administrators. Bright from the Start provides children with quality preschool knowledge that will be necessary for their future school achievements. They want to offer a system of professional development for the providers and for the staff.

== Mission ==
"The Georgia Department of Early Care and Learning enhances children’s early education experience to promote their academic, social-emotional, and physical development in partnership with families, communities, the early care and education industry, and stakeholders."

== Vision ==
"Every child in Georgia will have access to high quality early care and education regardless of family income or location."

== Child and Adult Care Food Program (CACFP) ==
The Child and Adult Care Food Program (CACFP) is federally funded, and it uses funds to reimburse providers for giving meals to children or adults in a day care. Providers include adult care centers, child care centers, family child care homes, emergency shelters, and after-school programs. Funding comes through grants from the USDA. Most children served are 12 years of age or younger, but in after-school programs, children through 18 may be eligible for reimbursement. Adults served must be age 60 or older or functionally impaired.

== Child Care Services (CCS) ==
Many of Georgia's children are cared for outside of their homes each day. It is important that these places be nurturing, healthy, and safe, and also offer opportunities to learn and grow, so that children can develop. In Georgia, there are 3000 child care learning centers, 3100 child care learning homes, and 2000 informal care providers. CCS division of Bright From the Start licenses and monitors these programs.

CCS is responsible for:

- Supporting licensed centers and homes through technical assistance, monitoring, and training.
- Providing information to parents about programs.
- Providing consumer education by information about child development available to parents.
- Providing assistance and information to new programs.
- Investigating complaints of child care programs.
- Investigating reports of unlicensed child care operations.

== Head Start Collaboration ==
The Head Start State Collaboration Office builds collaborative partnerships between federally funded Head Start programs and state-funded early childhood programs. The goal of this is to improve the quality of services to low-income families. The Head Start State Collaboration Office aligns all early education and care programs in Georgia with the state's K-12 education standards.

== Inclusion ==
Including children with disabilities in early childhood settings has been shown to benefit children.

== Georgia's Pre-K Program ==
Georgia's Pre-K Program is lottery funded, and it is an educational program for four year olds to prepare them for Kindergarten.

== Training ==
The program offers a variety of training to further the participant's education and knowledge. Some training may provide assistance with a child that has special needs. Bright from the Start has yearly conferences to offer training and Continuing Education Unit (CEU). They administer a range of programs that focuses on children between the ages of birth through school age.

== Funding ==
The funding of Bright from the Start comes from several funds that include state lottery, general state funds, Head Start programs, federal block grants, and federal nutrition programs. Bright from the Start also houses the federal find of the Head Start Collaboration Office.

The CAPS Program is funded by CCDF (Child Care and Development Fund). As of October 1, 2016 CAPS childcare payments are available only to the following priority groups: TANF applicants and recipients, children in DFCS custody or in Child Protective Services, minor parents in school, grandparents raising grandchildren, children with special needs, children in Georgia’s Pre-K Program requiring extended care, or victims of a natural disaster, persons who are considered homeless, persons experiencing domestic violence, and families with very low income. http://decal.ga.gov/documents/attachments/fundingrestrictionsqa.pdf

== Goals ==
Bright from the Start's wants to increase the number of Georgia's children and families that will become accessible to quality care and to the learning programs. Bright from the Start work attempts to expand support services to after school programs as well as during school hours.
