= Dimitri Alexander Christakis =

American pediatrician, researcher, and author

Dimitri Alexander Christakis is an American pediatrician, researcher, and author from Seattle, Washington.

== Education ==
Christakis received a BA (English Literature) from Yale University, and MD from the University of Pennsylvania, and an MPH from the University of Washington.

== Career ==
Christakis is the George Adkins Professor at the University of Washington, Seattle, WA in the Department of Pediatrics. He was appointed Director of Center for Child Health, Behavior, and Development at Seattle Children's Hospital Research Institute in 2005, and he is a member of the American Academy of Pediatrics. In addition, he is an adjunct professor in the Departments of Health Services and Psychiatry at the University of Washington.

Christakis and his colleagues have conducted research on the risk factors of early television exposure, detailing an increased risk for the onset of attention, health, and behavioral issues in adolescents. He is the co-author of The Elephant in the Living Room: Make Television Work for Your Kids ( 2006). His research also focused on how the language acquisition for children can be improved by playing blocks and how children are aggressive while watching violent cartoons at 7–10 years of age. As part of a popular TEDx talk, Christakis spoke regarding the newborn brain and media exposure on children. He has appeared frequently in public media to talk about screen exposure and the benefits of manual play (and other topics) in children.

Christakis has been instrumental in the revision of national guidelines on pediatric screen exposure. And his research was also instrumental in calling into question the efficacy of "Baby Einstein" (and similar) videos; his group's research, published in the Journal of Pediatrics, found that "for every hour a child 8 to 16 months old watched educational videos, they understood six to eight fewer words than their peers."

During the COVID-19 pandemic, Christakis appeared frequently on public media to help advance the public understanding of science related to the situation faced by children, particularly with respect to the harms accruing to children from having to be masked or out of school.

Christakis was appointed the editor-in-chief of the leading peer-reviewed journal JAMA Pediatrics in 2018.

In 2023, he was appointed the Chief Health Officer of Special Olympics International.

His H-index is 107.

=== Awards and honors ===
In 2010, Christakis received the Research Award for Lifetime Contribution by the Academic Pediatric Association, and, in 2018, he was elected as Member of Washington State Academy of Sciences. He was elected a member of the National Academy of Medicine in 2026.

== Selected publications ==
- Christakis, Dimitri A.; Zimmerman, Frederick J.; DiGiuseppe, David L.; McCarty, Carolyn A. (April 1, 2004). "Early Television Exposure and Subsequent Attentional Problems in Children". Pediatrics. 113 (4): 708–713. doi:10.1542/peds.113.4.708. PMID 15060216.
- Christakis, Dimitri A.; Mell, Loren; Koepsell, Thomas D.; Zimmerman, Frederick J.; Connell, Frederick A. (March 1, 2001). "Association of Lower Continuity of Care With Greater Risk of Emergency Department Use and Hospitalization in Children". Pediatrics. 107 (3): 524–529. doi:10.1542/peds.107.3.524. PMID 11230593.
- Christakis, D A; Feudtner, C (April 1993). "Ethics in a short white coat: the ethical dilemmas that medical students confront". Academic Medicine. 68 (4): 249–54. doi:10.1097/00001888-199304000-00003. PMID 8466599.
- Christakis, Dimitri A (January 2009). "The effects of infant media usage: what do we know and what should we learn?". Acta Paediatrica. 98 (1): 8–16. doi:10.1111/j.1651-2227.2008.01027.x. PMID 18793294.
- Christakis, Dimitri A.; Gilkerson, Jill; Richards, Jeffrey A.; Zimmerman, Frederick J.; Garrison, Michelle M.; Xu, Dongxin; Gray, Sharmistha; Yapanel, Umit (June 2009). "Audible Television and Decreased Adult Words, Infant Vocalizations, and Conversational Turns: A Population-Based Study". Archives of Pediatrics & Adolescent Medicine. 163 (6): 554–558. doi:10.1001/archpediatrics.2009.61. PMID 19487612.
