= Juan Sánchez Muliterno =

Juan Sánchez Muliterno is the president of the World Association of Early Childhood Educators (AMEI-WAECE).

== Biography ==
Juan Sánchez Muliterno was born in Albacete, Spain in 1948. Upon completing his university studies (Agronomical Engineering - Universidad Politécnica de Valencia from 1969-1974. & Master's in Business Management and Administration), Juan established a consulting office for businesses in Valencia, which gradually linked him to the sector of daycare centers. As a consultant for nursery schools and daycare centers, he proposed the creation of an association in Valencia and then served as a member and consultant.

In 1987, he decided to redirect his life and dedicate himself completely to educating the youngest of children.

In 1992, he worked with other professionals around the world dedicated to childhood education to found The World Association of Early Childhood Educators, which received a WANGO Education, Media and Arts Award in 2007. He has held the position of president since its inauguration.

He has developed through the Association multiple activities for the formation of an education and culture for peace, which has materialized in the periodic holding of a great World Congress for Childhood Education for Peace.

He is a collaborating professor at various universities in Spain and Latin America.
