= Society and culture of the Victorian era =

Society and culture in the United Kingdom during the Victorian era saw a rapidly growing middle class who became an important cultural influence; to a significant extent replacing the aristocracy as the dominant class in British society. A distinctive middle class lifestyle developed which influenced what was valued by society as a whole. Increased importance was placed on the value of the family and a private home. Women had limited legal rights in most areas of life and were expected to focus on domestic matters relying on men as breadwinners. Whilst parental authority was seen as important, children were given legal protections against abuse and neglect for the first time. The growing middle class and strong evangelical movement placed great emphasis on a respectable and moral code of behaviour.

As well as personal improvement, importance was given to social reform. The idea of "reform" was a motivating force, as seen in the political activity of religious groups and the newly formed labour unions. Reform efforts included the expansion of voting rights and the alleviation of harmful policies in industry. Utilitarianism was another philosophy which saw itself as based on science rather than on morality, but also emphasised social progress. An alliance formed between these two ideological strands.

A growing number of Christians in England and Wales were not Anglicans, and nonconformists pushed for the disestablishment of the Church of England. Legal discrimination against nonconformists and Catholics was reduced. Secularism and doubts about the accuracy of the Old Testament grew among people with higher levels of education. Northern English and Scottish academics tended to be more religiously conservative, whilst agnosticism and even atheism (though its promotion was illegal) gained appeal among academics in the south. Historians refer to a "Victorian Crisis of Faith" as a period when religious views had to readjust to suit new scientific knowledge and criticism of the Bible.

Access to education increased rapidly during the 19th century. State funded schools were established in England and Wales for the first time. Education became compulsory for pre-teenaged children in England, Scotland and Wales. Literacy rates increased rapidly and had become nearly universal by the end of the century. Private education for wealthier children, both boys and more gradually girls, became more formalised over the course of the century. A variety of reading materials grew in popularity during the period. Other popular forms of entertainment included brass bands, circuses, "spectacles" (alleged paranormal activities), amateur nature collecting, gentlemen's clubs for wealthier men and seaside holidays for the middle class. Many sports were introduced or popularised during the Victorian era. They became important to male identity. Popular sports of the period included cricket, cycling, croquet, horse-riding, and many water activities. Opportunities for leisure increased as restrictions were placed on maximum working hours, wages increased and routine annual leave became increasingly common.

== Common culture ==
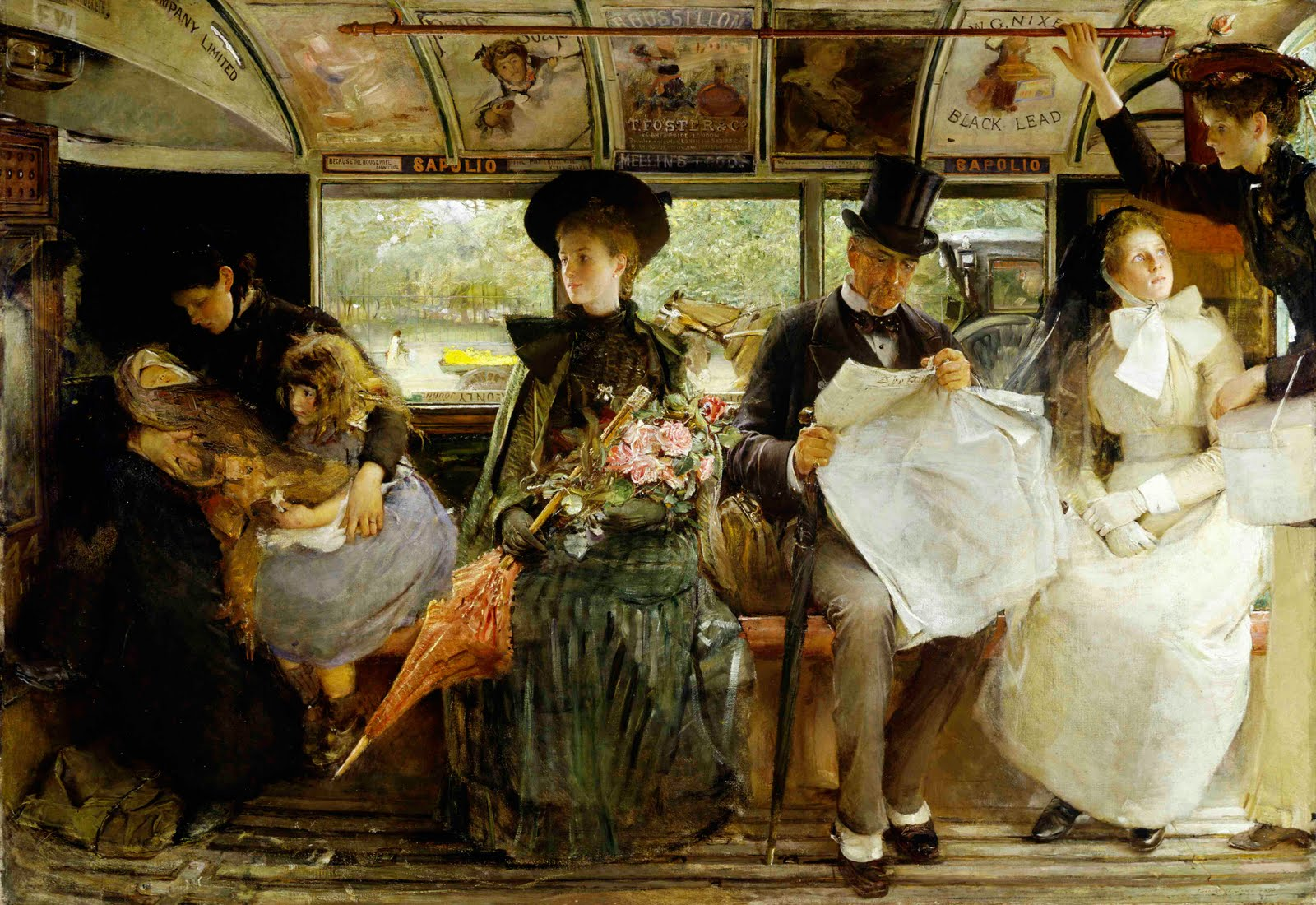
George William Joy's painting The Bayswater Omnibus, 1895, depicts middle-class social life in this English late Victorian-era scene.

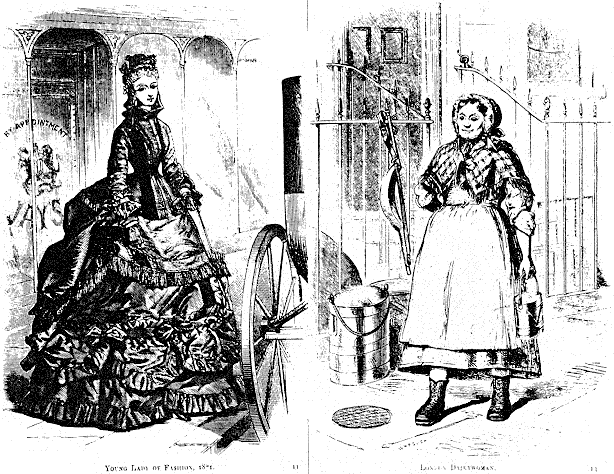
1871 illustration in Punch magazine depicts the social divide in clothing styles. The woman on the left is a "young lady of fashion" whilst the woman on the right is a "London dairywoman".

The rise of the middle class during the era had a formative effect on its character; the historian Walter E. Houghton reflects that "once the middle class attained political as well as financial eminence, their social influence became decisive. The Victorian frame of mind is largely composed of their characteristic modes of thought and feeling".

Industrialisation brought with it a rapidly growing middle class whose increase in numbers had a significant effect on the social strata itself: cultural norms, lifestyle, values and morality. Identifiable characteristics came to define the middle-class home and lifestyle. Previously, in town and city, residential space was adjacent to or incorporated into the work site, virtually occupying the same geographical space. The difference between private life and commerce was a fluid one distinguished by an informal demarcation of function. In the Victorian era, English family life increasingly became compartmentalised, the home a self-contained structure housing a nuclear family extended according to need and circumstance to include blood relations. The concept of "privacy" became a hallmark of the middle-class life.

The English home closed up and darkened over the decade (1850s), the cult of domesticity matched by a cult of privacy. Bourgeois existence was a world of interior space, heavily curtained off and wary of intrusion, and opened only by invitation for viewing on occasions such as parties or teas. "The essential, unknowability of each individual, and society's collaboration in the maintenance of a façade behind which lurked innumerable mysteries, were the themes which preoccupied many mid-century novelists."

— Kate Summerscale quoting historian Anthony S. Wohl

== Reform movements ==
The central feature of Victorian-era politics is the search for reform and improvement, including both the individual personality and society. Three powerful forces were at work. First was the rapid rise of the middle class, in large part displacing the complete control long exercised by the aristocracy. Respectability was their code—a businessman had to be trusted and must avoid reckless gambling and heavy drinking. Second, the spiritual reform closely linked to evangelical Christianity, including both the Nonconformist sects, such as the Methodists, and especially the evangelical or Low Church element in the established Church of England, typified by Lord Shaftesbury (1801–1885). It imposed fresh moralistic values on society, such as Sabbath observance, responsibility, widespread charity, discipline in the home, and self-examination for the smallest faults and needs of improvement. Starting with the anti-slavery movement of the 1790s, the evangelical moralizers developed highly effective techniques of enhancing the moral sensibilities of all family members and reaching the public at large through intense, very well organized agitation and propaganda. They focused on exciting a personal revulsion against social evils and personal misbehaviour. Asa Briggs points out, "There were as many treatises on 'domestic economy' in mid-Victorian England as on political economy"

The third effect came from the liberalism of philosophical utilitarians, led by intellectuals Jeremy Bentham (1748–1832), James Mill (1773–1836) and his son John Stuart Mill (1806–1873). They were not moralistic but scientific. Their movement, often called "Philosophic Radicalism," fashioned a formula for promoting the goal of "progress" using scientific rationality, and business-like efficiency, to identify, measure, and discover solutions to social problems. The formula was an inquiry, legislation, execution, inspection, and report. In public affairs, their leading exponent was Edwin Chadwick (1800–1890). Evangelicals and utilitarians shared a basic middle-class ethic of responsibility and formed a political alliance. The result was an irresistible force for reform.

Social reforms focused on ending slavery, removing the slavery-like burdens on women and children, and reforming the police to prevent crime, rather than emphasizing the very harsh punishment of criminals. Even more important were political reforms, especially the lifting of disabilities on nonconformists and Roman Catholics, and above all, the reform of Parliament and elections to introduce democracy and replace the old system whereby senior aristocrats controlled dozens of seats in parliament.

The long-term effect of the reform movements was to tightly link the nonconformist element with the Liberal party. The dissenters gave significant support to moralistic issues, such as temperance and sabbath enforcement. The nonconformist conscience, as it was called, was repeatedly called upon by Gladstone for support for his moralistic foreign policy. In election after election, Protestant ministers rallied their congregations to the Liberal ticket. In Scotland, the Presbyterians played a similar role to the Nonconformist Methodists, Baptists and other groups in England and Wales. The political strength of Dissent faded sharply after 1920 with the secularization of British society in the 20th century.

== Religion ==
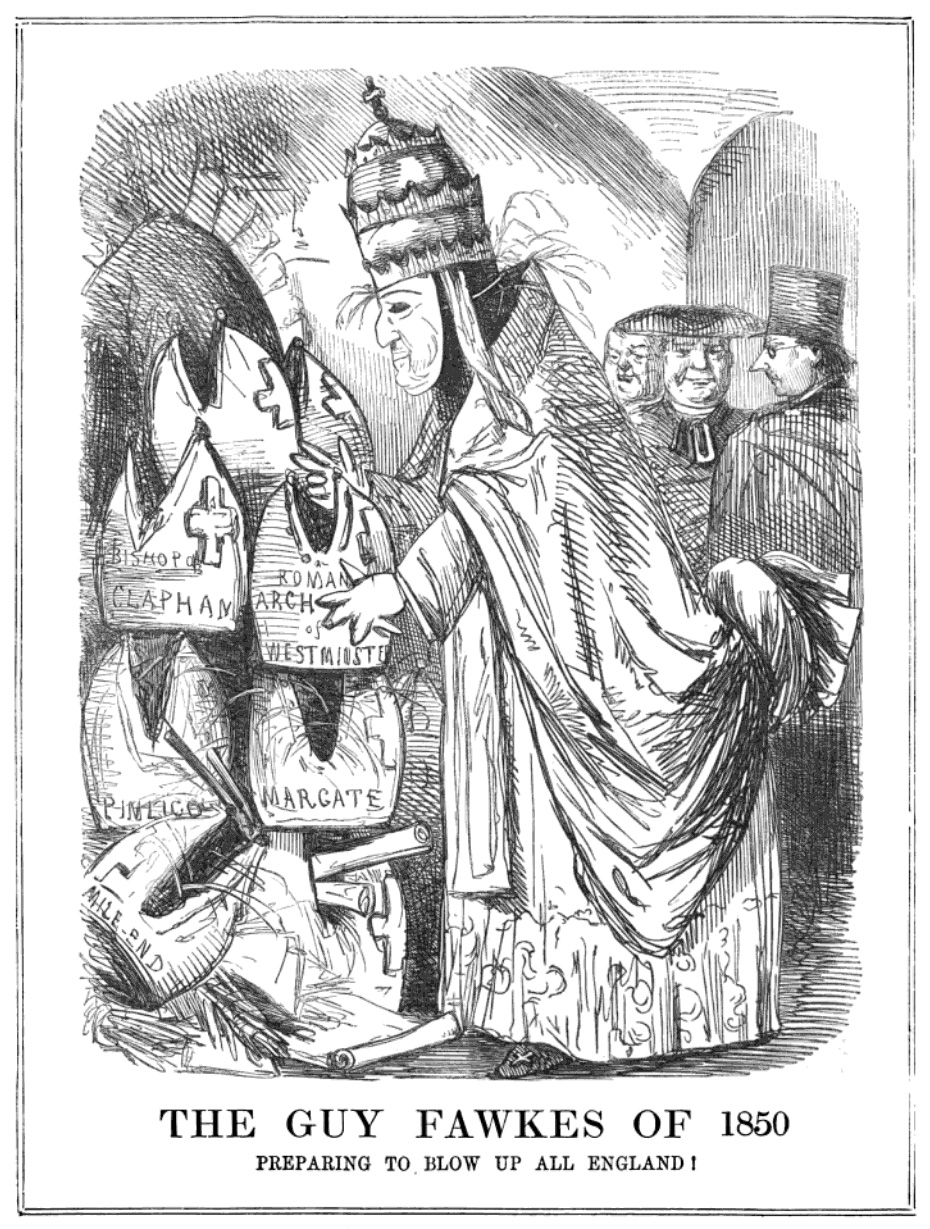
The restoration of the Catholic hierarchy in 1850 provoked a strong reaction. This sketch is from an issue of Punch, printed in November that year.

Religion was a battleground during this era, with the Nonconformists fighting bitterly against the established status of the Church of England, especially regarding education and access to universities and public office. Penalties on Roman Catholics were mostly removed. The Vatican restored the English Catholic bishoprics in 1850 and numbers grew through conversions and immigration from Ireland. The Oxford Movement was also occurring around this time, which would draw in new converts to the Catholic Church; among these was John Henry Newman. Secularism and doubts about the accuracy of the Old Testament grew as the scientific outlook rapidly gained ground among the better educated. This doubt made them receptive to German idealism, which was imported to England principally by Thomas Carlyle and, before him though less successfully, Samuel Taylor Coleridge. Coleridge resisted the empirical legacy of the Age of Enlightenment, while Carlyle, a Scotsman, critiqued utilitarianism from within the tradition of Scottish metaphysics. Walter E. Houghton argues, "Perhaps the most important development in 19th-century intellectual history was the extension of scientific assumptions and methods from the physical world to the whole life of man."

During the mid-nineteenth century, there were two distinct religious mentalities among British academics. The North British school was religiously conservative and commercially engaged thanks to the influence of Presbyterianism and Calvinism. Northern English and Scottish researchers played a key role in the development of thermodynamics, which was motivated by the desire to design ever more efficient engines. By contrast, in the South, mentalities of Anglicanism, agnosticism, and even atheism were more common. Academics such as the biologist Thomas Huxley promoted "scientific naturalism."

=== Church of England ===
During the 19th century, the established Church of England expanded greatly at home and abroad. It enrolled about half the population, especially in rural areas where the local gentry dominated religious affairs. However it was much weaker in the fast-growing industrial cities.

Church of England funding came largely from voluntary contributions. In England and Wales it doubled the number of active clergyman, and built or enlarged several thousand churches. Around mid-century it was consecrating seven new or rebuilt churches every month. It proudly took primary responsibility for a rapid expansion of elementary education, with parish-based schools, and diocesan-based colleges to train the necessary teachers. In the 1870s, the national government assume part of the funding; in 1880 the Church was educating 73% of all students. In addition there was a vigorous home mission, with many clergy, scripture readers, visitors, deaconesses and Anglican sisters in the rapidly growing cities. Overseas the Church kept up with the expanding Empire. It sponsored extensive missionary work, supporting 90 new bishoprics and thousands of missionaries across the globe.

In addition to local endowments and pew rentals, Church financing came from a few government grants, and especially from voluntary contributions. The result was that some old rural parishes were well funded, and most of the rapidly growing urban parishes were underfunded.

The start of the 19th century saw an increase in missionary work and many of the major missionary societies were founded around this time (see Timeline of Christian missions). Both the Evangelical and high church movements sponsored missionaries.

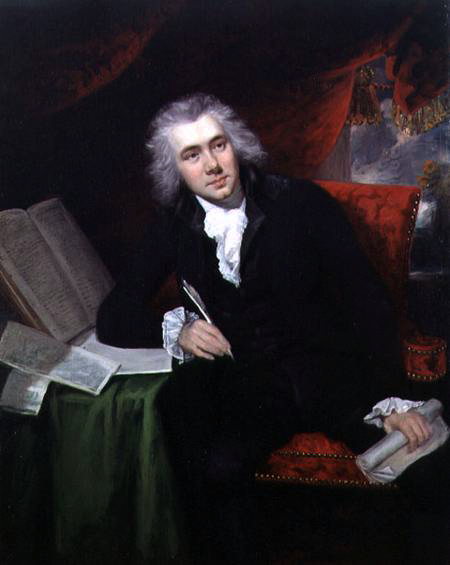
William Wilberforce was a politician, philanthropist and an evangelical Anglican, who led the British movement to abolish the slave trade.

"Christian conscience" was the target chosen by the British Evangelical movement to promote social activism. Evangelicals believed activism in government and the social sphere was an essential method in reaching the goal of eliminating sin in a world drenched in wickedness. The Evangelicals in the Clapham Sect included figures such as William Wilberforce who successfully campaigned for the abolition of slavery.

=== Dissent and Nonconformist Protestantism ===
Nonconformist conscience describes the moral sensibility of the Nonconformist churches—those which dissent from the established Church of England—that influenced British politics in the 19th and early 20th centuries. In the 1851 census of church attendance, non-conformists who went to chapel comprised half the attendance of Sunday services. Nonconformists were focused in the fast-growing urban middle class. The two categories of this group were in addition to the evangelicals or "Low Church" element in the Church of England: "Old Dissenters," dating from the 16th and 17th centuries, included Baptists, Congregationalists, Quakers, Unitarians, and Presbyterians outside Scotland; "New Dissenters" emerged in the 18th century and were mainly Methodists. The "Nonconformist conscience" of the Old group emphasized religious freedom and equality, the pursuit of justice, and opposition to discrimination, compulsion, and coercion. The New Dissenters (and also the Anglican evangelicals) stressed personal morality issues, including sexuality, temperance, family values, and Sabbath-keeping. Both factions were politically active, but until the mid-19th century, the Old group supported mostly Whigs and Liberals in politics, while the New—like most Anglicans—generally supported Conservatives. In the late 19th century, the New Dissenters mostly switched to the Liberal Party. The result was a merging of the two groups, strengthening their great weight as a political pressure group. They joined on new issues especially regarding schools and temperance, with the latter of special interest to Methodists. By 1914 the linkage was weakening and by the 1920s it was virtually dead.

In addition to stressing the traditional Wesleyan combination of "Bible, cross, conversion, and activism", the revivalist movement sought a universal appeal, designed to reach rich and poor, urban and rural, and men and women. They added work to keep the children their parents brought and to generate literature to spread God's message. The first evangelical megachurch, the Metropolitan Tabernacle with its 6000-seat auditorium, was launched in 1861 in London by Charles Spurgeon, a Baptist.

Parliament had long imposed a series of political disabilities on Nonconformists outside Scotland. They could not hold most public offices, they had to pay local taxes to the Anglican church, be married by Anglican ministers, and be denied attendance at Oxford or degrees at Cambridge. Dissenters demanded the removal of political and civil disabilities that applied to them (especially those in the Test and Corporation Acts). The Anglican establishment strongly resisted until 1828. Dissenters organized into a political pressure group and succeeded in 1828 in the repeal of some restrictions. It was a major achievement for an outside group, but the Dissenters were not finished and the early Victorian period saw them even more active and successful in eliminating their grievances. Next on the agenda was the matter of church rates, which were local taxes at the parish level for the support of the parish church building in England and Wales. Only buildings of the established church received the tax money. Civil disobedience was attempted but was met with the seizure of personal property and even imprisonment. The compulsory factor was finally abolished in 1868 by William Ewart Gladstone, and payment was made voluntary. While Gladstone was a moralistic evangelical inside the Church of England, he had strong support in the Nonconformist community. The Marriage Act 1836 allowed local government registrars to handle marriages. Nonconformist ministers in their chapels were allowed to marry couples if a registrar was present. Also in 1836, civil registration of births, deaths, and marriages was taken from the hands of local parish officials and given to local government registrars. Burial of the dead was a more troubling problem, for urban chapels had no graveyards, and Nonconformists sought to use the traditional graveyards controlled by the established church. The Burial Laws Amendment Act 1880 finally allowed that.

Oxford University required students seeking admission to subscribe to the 39 Articles of the Church of England. Cambridge required that for a diploma. The two ancient universities opposed giving a charter to the new University of London in the 1830s because it had no such restriction. The university, nevertheless, was established in 1837, and by the 1850s Oxford dropped its restrictions. In 1871 Gladstone sponsored the Universities Tests Act 1871 that provided full access to degrees and fellowships. Nonconformists (especially Unitarians and Presbyterians) played major roles in founding new universities in the late 19th century at Manchester, as well as Birmingham, Liverpool and Leeds.

=== Agnostics and freethinkers ===
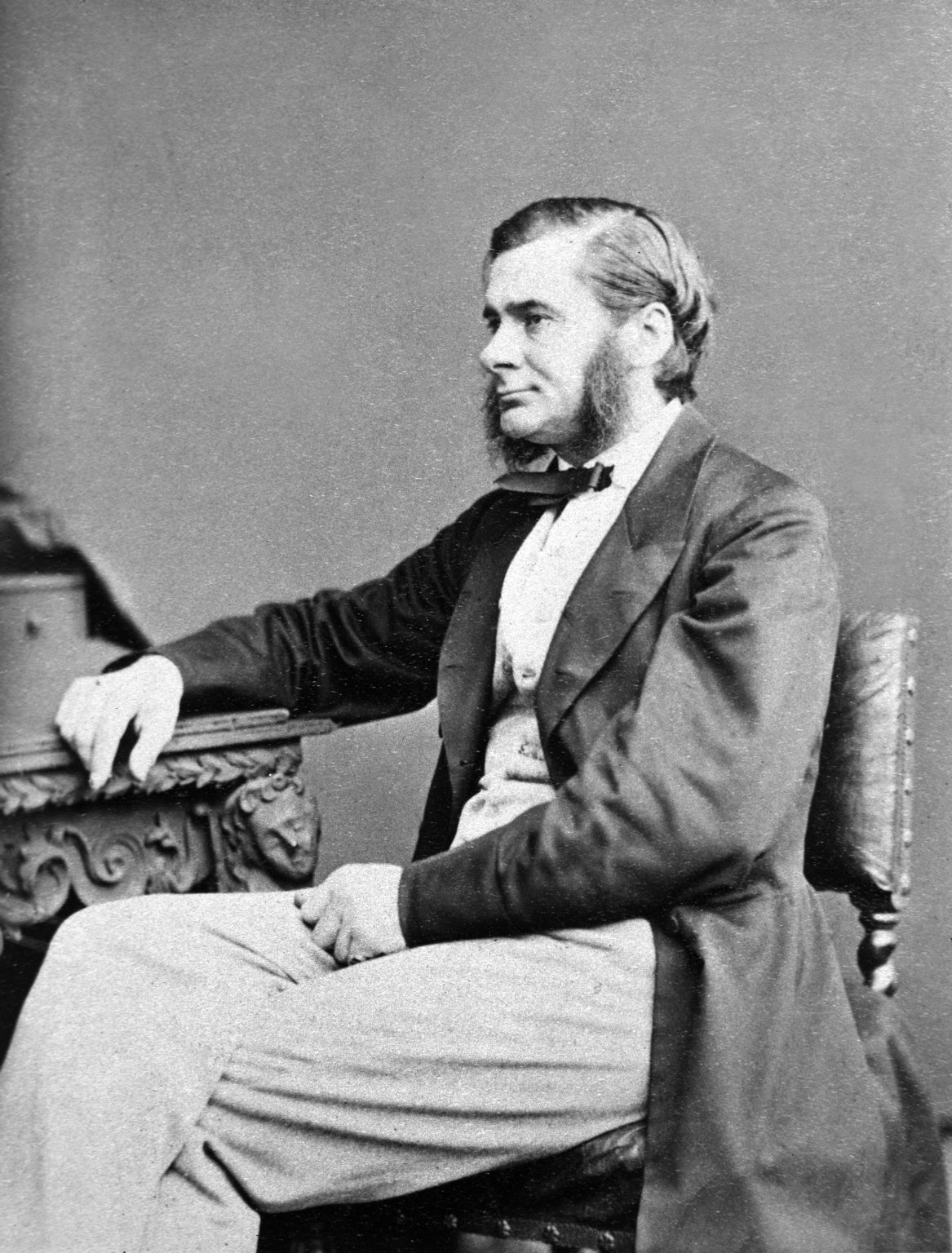
T. H. Huxley's famous debate in 1860 with Samuel Wilberforce was a key moment in the wider acceptance of Charles Darwin's theory of evolution

The abstract theological or philosophical doctrine of agnosticism, whereby it is theoretically impossible to prove whether or not God exists, suddenly became a popular issue around 1869, when T. H. Huxley coined the term. It was much discussed for several decades, and had its journal edited by William Stewart Ross (1844–1906) the Agnostic Journal and Eclectic Review. Interest petered out by the 1890s, and when Ross died the Journal soon closed. Ross championed agnosticism in opposition not so much to Christianity, but to atheism, as expounded by Charles Bradlaugh. The term "atheism" never became popular. Blasphemy laws meant that promoting atheism could be a crime and was vigorously prosecuted. Charles Southwell was among the editors of an explicitly atheistic periodical, Oracle of Reason, or Philosophy Vindicated, who were imprisoned for blasphemy in the 1840s.

Disbelievers called themselves "freethinkers" or "secularists". They included John Stuart Mill, George Eliot and Matthew Arnold. They were not necessarily hostile to Christianity, as Huxley repeatedly emphasized. The literary figures were caught in something of a trap – their business was writing and their theology said there was nothing for certain to write. They instead concentrated on the argument that it was not necessary to believe in God to behave in moral fashion. The scientists, on the other hand, paid less attention to theology and more attention to the exciting issues raised by Charles Darwin in terms of evolution. The proof of God's existence that said he had to exist to have a marvellously complex world was no longer satisfactory when biology demonstrated that complexity could arise through evolution.

Because of these developments in science, the emergence of higher criticism of the Bible, and the appeal of freethinkers, historians refer to a "Victorian Crisis of Faith" — a period of painful adjustment in family relationships and public morality resulting from shifting religious views.

=== Anti-Catholicism ===
Anti-Catholic attitudes persisted throughout the 19th century, particularly following the sudden massive Irish Catholic migration to England and Scotland during the Great Famine of the mid-1840s.

The forces of anti-Catholicism were defeated by the unexpected mass mobilization of Catholic activists in Ireland, led by Daniel O'Connell. The Catholics had long been passive but now there was a clear threat of insurrection that troubled Prime Minister Wellington and his aide Robert Peel. The passage of Catholic emancipation in 1829, which allowed Catholics to sit in Parliament, opened the way for a large Irish Catholic contingent. Year by year the Catholics mobilized their voters into a well-disciplined bloc that played a powerful role in the British Parliament under the leadership especially of O'Connell, Charles Stewart Parnell and John Redmond. Lord Shaftesbury (1801–1885), a prominent philanthropist, was a pre-millennial evangelical Anglican who believed in the imminent second coming of Christ, and became a leader in anti-Catholicism. He strongly opposed the Oxford Movement in the Church of England, fearful of its high church Catholics features. In 1845, he denounced the Maynooth Grant which funded the Catholic seminary in Ireland that would train many priests. In Ireland the Anglican "Church of Ireland" lost its established status in 1871, but remained the church of the English-speaking Protestants who owned most of the farmland on which the Irish Catholics were tenants or laborers. The Irish Catholics mobilized politically and at times used violence. Starting in the 1890s the British government bought out these landlords (who returned to England), and sold the land to the local Catholics. In 1850 Pope Pius IX re-established the Catholic ecclesiastical hierarchy with new bishops. The response was a frenzy of anti-Catholic feeling, often stoked by newspapers. Examples include an effigy of Cardinal Wiseman, the new head of the restored hierarchy, being paraded through the streets and burned on Bethnal Green, and graffiti proclaiming 'No popery!' being chalked on walls. Charles Kingsley wrote a vigorously anti-Catholic book Hypatia (1853). The novel was mainly aimed at the embattled Catholic minority in England, who had recently emerged from a half-illegal status.

New Catholic episcopates, which ran parallel to the established Anglican episcopates, and a Catholic conversion drive awakened fears of 'papal aggression' and relations between the Catholic Church and the establishment remained frosty. At the end of the century one observer concluded that "the prevailing opinion of the religious people I knew and loved was that Roman Catholic worship is idolatry, and that it was better to be an Atheist than a Papist". When ritualistic practices in the Church of England came under attack as too ritualistic and too much akin to Catholicism, Parliament passed the Public Worship Regulation Act in 1874 to reverse the trend.

The Liberal party leader William Ewart Gladstone was a devout high-church Anglican. He had a complex ambivalence about Catholicism. Although attracted by its international success in majestic traditions, he strongly opposed to the authoritarianism of its pope and bishops, its profound public opposition to liberalism, and its refusal to distinguish between secular allegiance on the one hand and spiritual obedience on the other. The danger came when the pope or bishops attempted to exert temporal power, as in the Vatican decrees of 1870. a papal attempt to control churches in different nations, despite their independent nationalism. His polemical pamphlet against the infallibility declaration of the Catholic Church sold 150,000 copies in 1874. He demanded that Catholics obey the crown and disobey the pope and priests when there was disagreement.

=== Religious impact on political culture ===
Historian George Kitson Clark emphasizes the powerful role of religious claims and religious voices in Victorian British political culture. The era began in the 1830s with the great anti-slavery movement that climaxed with the abolition of slavery in the colonies. It was a highly emotional, brilliantly organized nationwide campaign that achieved one of the most dramatic shifts in global human rights: the abolition of chattel slavery of Africans. This crusade provided a model for moral reform activism because it showed that moral outrage focused through well-organized campaigns could effect major societal change. Many secular political movements consciously adopted its emotive, crusading form. Clark argues that the roots religion's political impact can be traced to Evangelical Revival that began in the 18th century. It rejuvenated the Church of England, infusing new life into the sleepy established church. Even more the revivals greatly strengthened the Nonconformist element outside the Church of England. It inspired social activism in the young, well-organized and highly disciplined Methodist Church of Great Britain, which served as a model for labor activists and social movements. The revival also provided fresh impetus to Congregationalists, Presbyterians, and Baptists. The major political result saw the Nonconformists play a central role in the rise after 1850 of the new Liberal Party that emerged in the 1850s. The values, organization, and activism stemming from the evangelical revivals helped shape the Liberal political style. Religion forces thus reshaped the nation's political landscape and progressive causes as well.

==== Impact on moral standards ====
A major social result was what became famous as "Victorian morality" of elites and commoners alike. The growing middle class and strong evangelical movement placed great emphasis on a respectable and moral code of behaviour. This included features such as charity, personal responsibility, avoiding alcoholism and excessive gambling, strict child discipline and intense self-criticism. Increasing emphasis was given to social reform. Secular people often favoured Utilitarianism, which also emphasised social progress. An alliance formed between these two ideological strands. The reformers emphasised causes such as improving the conditions of women and children, giving police reform priority over harsh punishment to prevent crime, religious equality, and political reform in order to establish a democracy. The political legacy of the reform movement was to link the nonconformists (part of the evangelical movement) in England and Wales with the Liberal Party. This continued until the First World War. The Presbyterians played a similar role as a religious voice for reform in Scotland.

== Marriage and family ==
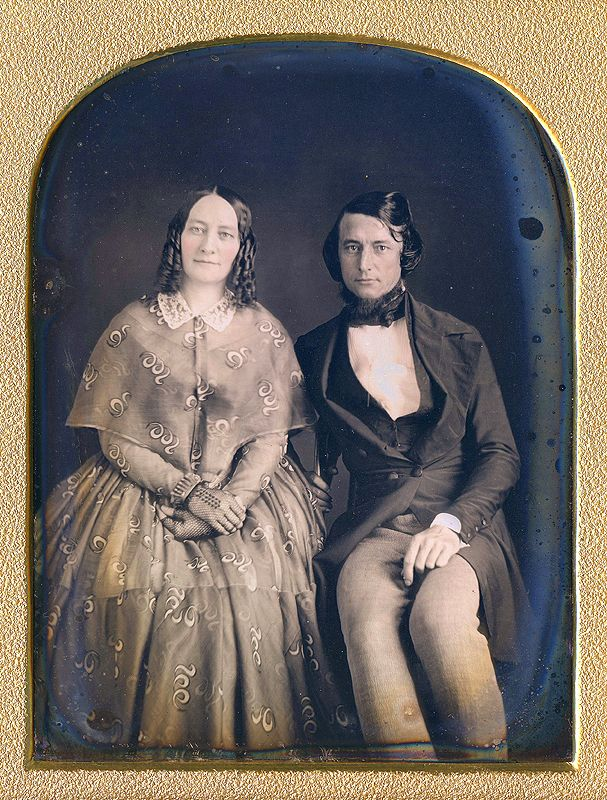
A daguerreotype of a Victorian couple, 1840s or 1850s

The centrality of the family was a dominant feature for all classes. Worriers repeatedly detected threats that had to be dealt with: working wives, overpaid youths, harsh factory conditions, bad housing, poor sanitation, excessive drinking, and religious decline. The licentiousness so characteristic of the upper class of the late 18th and early 19th centuries dissipated. The home became a refuge from the harsh world; middle-class wives sheltered their husbands from the tedium of domestic affairs. The number of children shrank, allowing much more attention to be paid to each child. Extended families were less common, as the nuclear family became both the ideal and the reality.

In Great Britain, elsewhere in Europe, and in the United States, the notion that marriage should be based on romantic love and companionship rather than convenience, money, or other strategic considerations grew in popularity during the Victorian period. Cheaper paper and printing technology made it easier for people to find romantic partners this way, hence the birth of the Valentine card.

=== Status of women ===
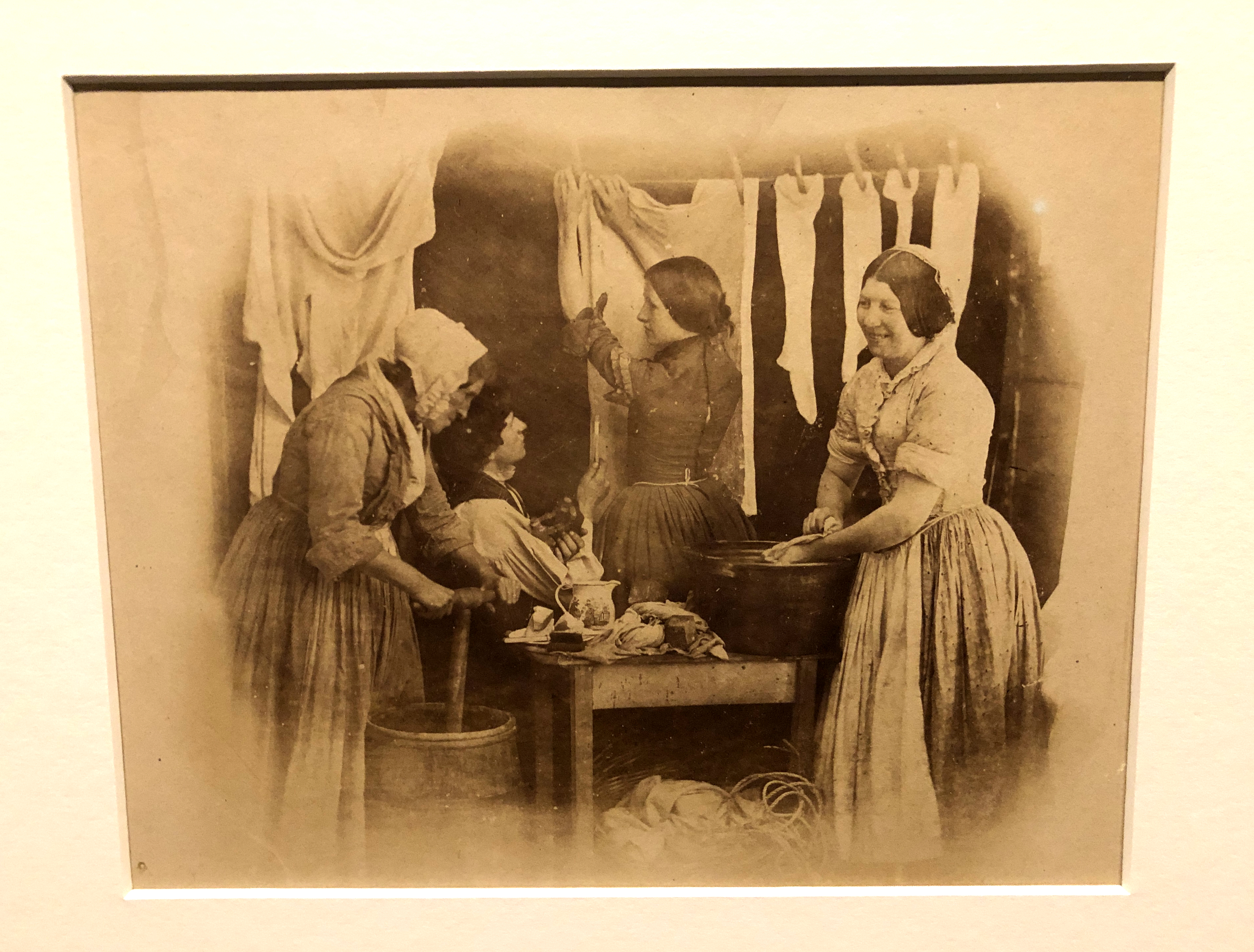
Victorian era photograph of women doing laundry taken by Oscar Rejoinder. An early photographer who recreated scenes in his studio based on activities he saw on the streets of London.

The emerging middle-class norm for women was separate spheres, whereby women avoid the public sphere – the domain of politics, paid work, commerce, and public speaking. Instead, they should dominate in the realm of domestic life, focused on the care of the family, the husband, the children, the household, religion, and moral behaviour. Religiosity was in the female sphere, and the Nonconformist churches offered new roles that women eagerly entered. They taught in Sunday schools, visited the poor and sick, distributed tracts, engaged in fundraising, supported missionaries, led Methodist class meetings, prayed with other women, and a few were allowed to preach to mixed audiences.

The long 1854 poem The Angel in the House by Coventry Patmore (1823–1896) exemplified the idealized Victorian woman who is angelically pure and devoted to her family and home. The poem was not a pure invention but reflected the emerging legal economic social, cultural, religious and moral values of the Victorian middle-class. Legally women had limited rights to their bodies, the family property, or their children. The recognized identities were those of daughter, wife, mother, and widow. Rapid growth and prosperity meant that fewer women had to find paid employment, and even when the husband owned a shop or small business, the wife's participation was less necessary. Meanwhile, the home sphere grew dramatically in size; women spent the money and decided on the furniture, clothing, food, schooling, and outward appearance the family would make. Patmore's model was widely copied – by Charles Dickens, for example. Literary critics of the time suggested that superior feminine qualities of delicacy, sensitivity, sympathy, and sharp observation gave women novelists a superior insight into stories about home family and love. This made their work highly attractive to the middle-class women who bought the novels and the serialized versions that appeared in many magazines. However, a few early feminists called for aspirations beyond the home. By the end of the century, the "New Woman" was riding a bicycle, wearing bloomers, signing petitions, supporting worldwide mission activities, and talking about the vote.

=== Status of children ===
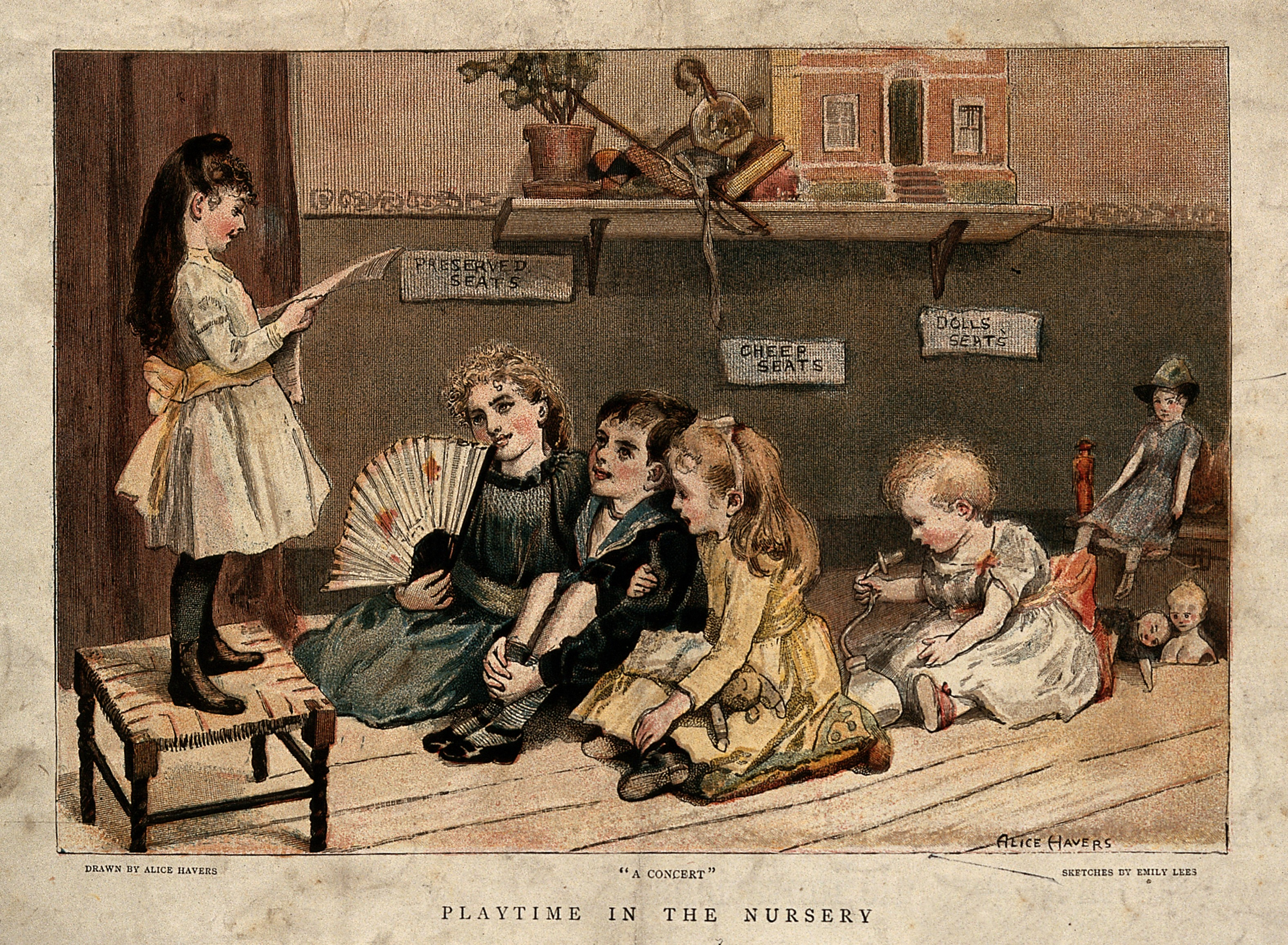
Illustration of Children playing in their nursery by Alice Havers (1890)

Throughout much of the 19th century parents and guardians held almost unlimited authority over children. The rights of parents to raise their children as they wished as well as the ability of adult authority figures to establish obedience in their charges through corporal punishment was given priority over concerns about children's safety. As social reformer Whatley Cooke-Taylor wrote:

I would far rather see even a higher rate of infant mortality prevailing.... than intrude one iota on the sanctity of the domestic hearth

Attitudes were shifting by the 1880s, beginning in 1883, local societies focused on child welfare began to be established across the country which had developed by the end of the decade into the National Society for the Prevention of Cruelty to Children. The Children's Charter which came into law in 1889 gave the state the ability to intervene in the parent-child relationship in order to prevent mistreatment for the first time. The rights of children were again extended five years later.

== Education and literacy ==
=== Mass education ===
The Industrial Revolution incentivised people to think more scientifically and to become more educated and informed in order to solve novel problems. As a result, cognitive abilities were pushed to their genetic limits, making people more intelligent and innovative than their predecessors. Formal education thus became vital. According to intelligence researcher James R. Flynn, these changes echoed down to the twentieth century before leveling off in the early twenty-first.

At the start of the 19th century there was not yet a consensus that universal education was beneficial. Some saw schooling for the working classes as unnecessary or even dangerous. However, by the 1830s, the risks of educating the working classes were generally seen as outweighed by the risks of leaving them ignorant or allowing their education to be out of the control of the authorities. Educational reformer James Kay-Shuttleworth said in 1838 that the state was responsible for "rearing... children in religion and industry, and of imparting such an amount of secular education as may fit them to discharge the duties of their station."

Enrolment at Sunday schools all of which taught children to read and some of which provided lessons in writing and arithmetic increased sharply during the first half of the 19th century from about 10% of five to eighteen-year-olds in 1800 to approximately 55% in 1851. Three-quarters of working-class children were estimated to have attended Sunday school at some point in their childhood. Various religious organisations began to establish "voluntary" fulltime schools and a growing number of private schools developed including ones aimed at the working-classes. However, in the 1850s around half of children in England and Wales were not in school during the working week. The quality of provision varied significantly, and the average length of attendance was only three years.

In England and Wales, the government began to provide state-funding to schools shortly before Victoria came to the throne which increased during the early decades of her reign, the degree of government oversight these schools were under also increased. The Elementary Education Act 1870 was intended to establish universal access to state-funded schools and the state began to run schools directly for the first time through a system of local governance. Education became compulsory for five- to ten-year-olds in 1880 and fees abolished in 1891. Compulsory education was expanded to deaf children, blind children and children up to the age of twelve in the 1890s. Scotland had a longer tradition of state-funded education dating back to the 17th century. The system which made school provision the responsibility of parishes generally led to better outcomes than elsewhere in Great Britain but struggled to cope with the pressures of industrialisation and standards began to slipe. A similar kind of grant system to voluntary schools was used in Scotland as in England. The Education (Scotland) Act 1872 introduced many of the same kinds of reforms as were taking place in England and Wales during the later 19th century. Education was made compulsory for five to thirteen-year-olds, the structure of the system was simplified, and many new schools were built.

As a consequence of various education reforms, literacy rates steadily rose. One way to determine the literacy rate is to count those who could sign their names on their marriage registers. Using this method, it was established that literacy in England and Wales reached roughly 90% by the late nineteenth century. Statistics of literacy from this era are likely underestimates because they were based on the number of people who could write, but throughout most of the nineteenth century, people were typically taught to read before they were taught to write. Literacy rates were higher in urban than rural areas. Rising literacy and urbanization provided an expanding market for printed materials, from cheap books to magazines. Literacy rates were generally higher in Scotland throughout much of the 19th century but the gap between the nations of Great Britain had closed by the century's end. By 1900, only around 3% of people in England and Wales were illiterate with a similar rate in Scotland.

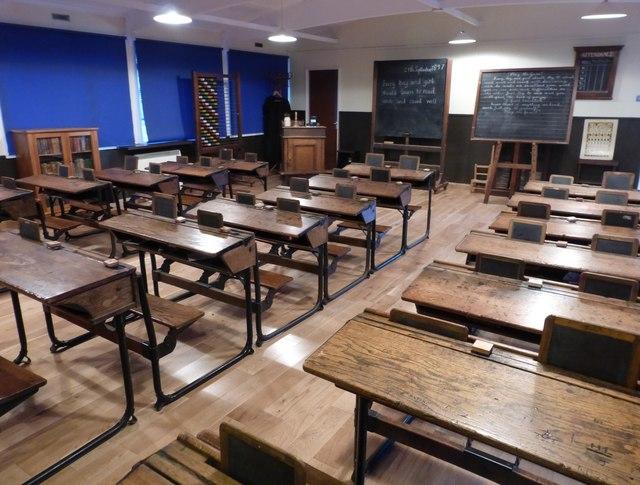
Recreation of Victorian furnishings in a 21st-century classroom

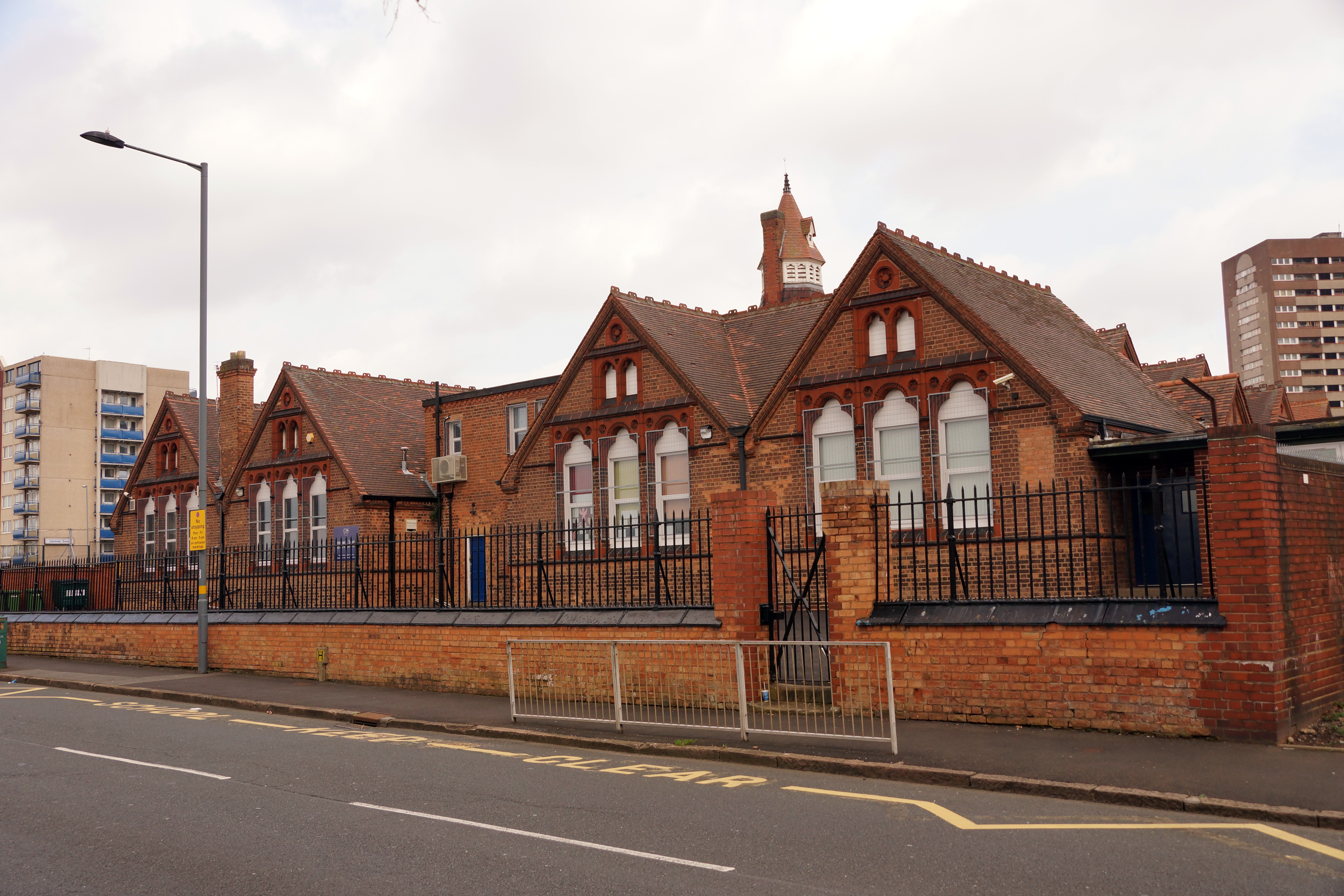
Cromwell street school formally a Birmingham board school established following the Elementary Education Act 1870

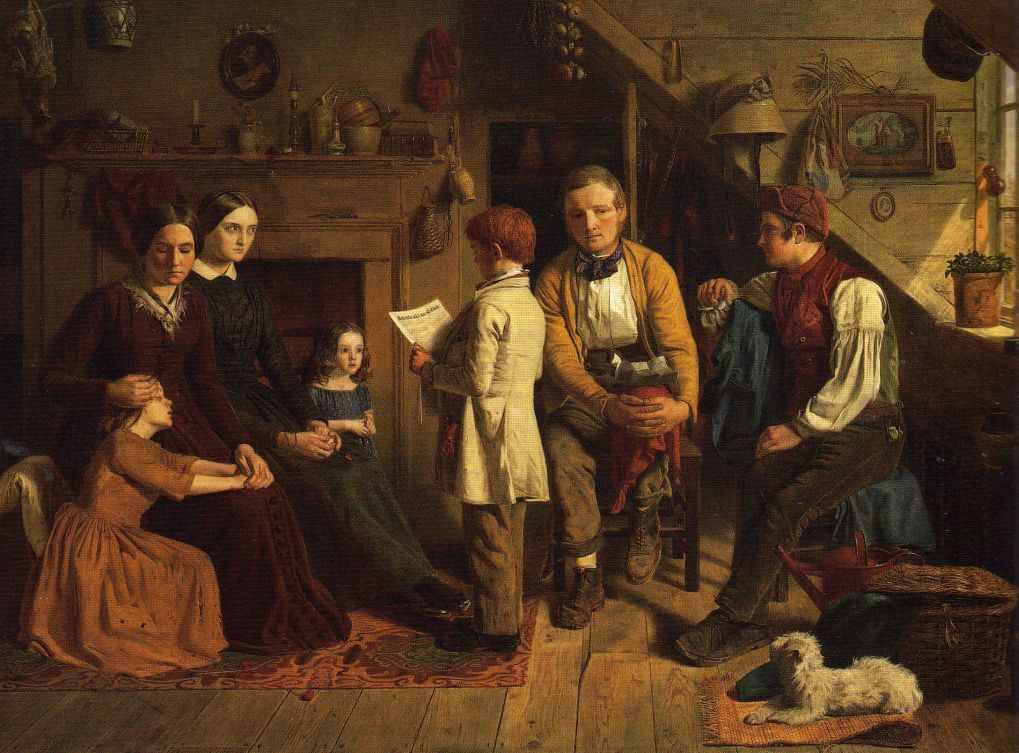
The Emigration Scheme (1852), depicts a young boy reading a document for his illiterate family, reflecting the sharp increase in education levels during the 19th century.

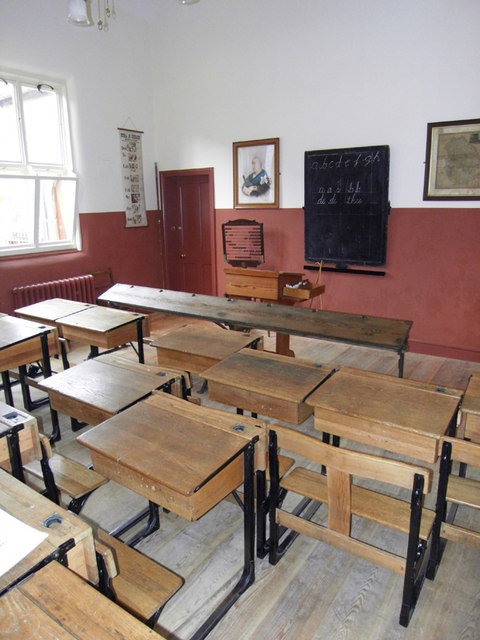
Recreation of a classroom (c.1890)

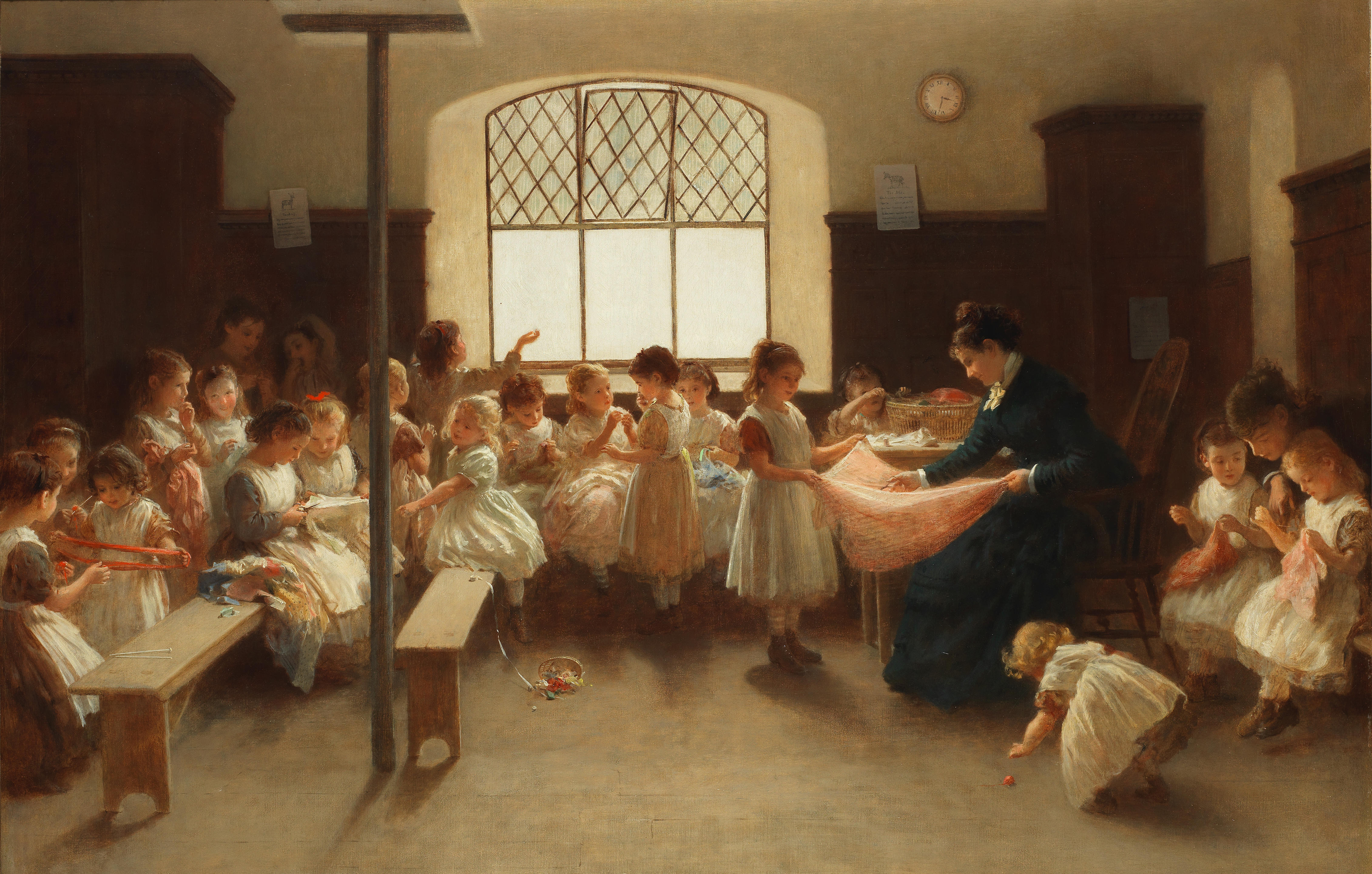
The sewing class, depiction of a school sewing lesson by John Morgan

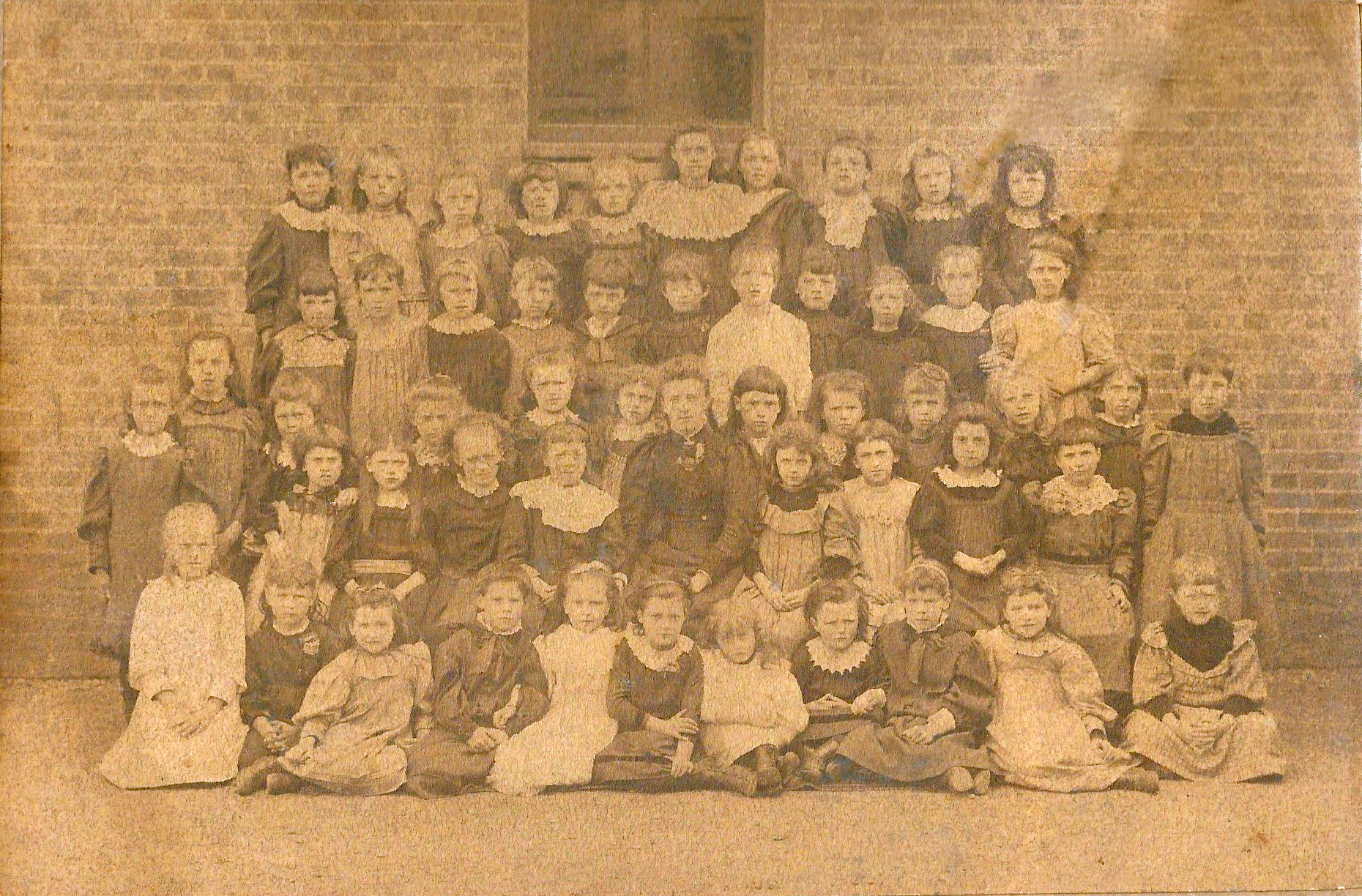
Victorian class photo

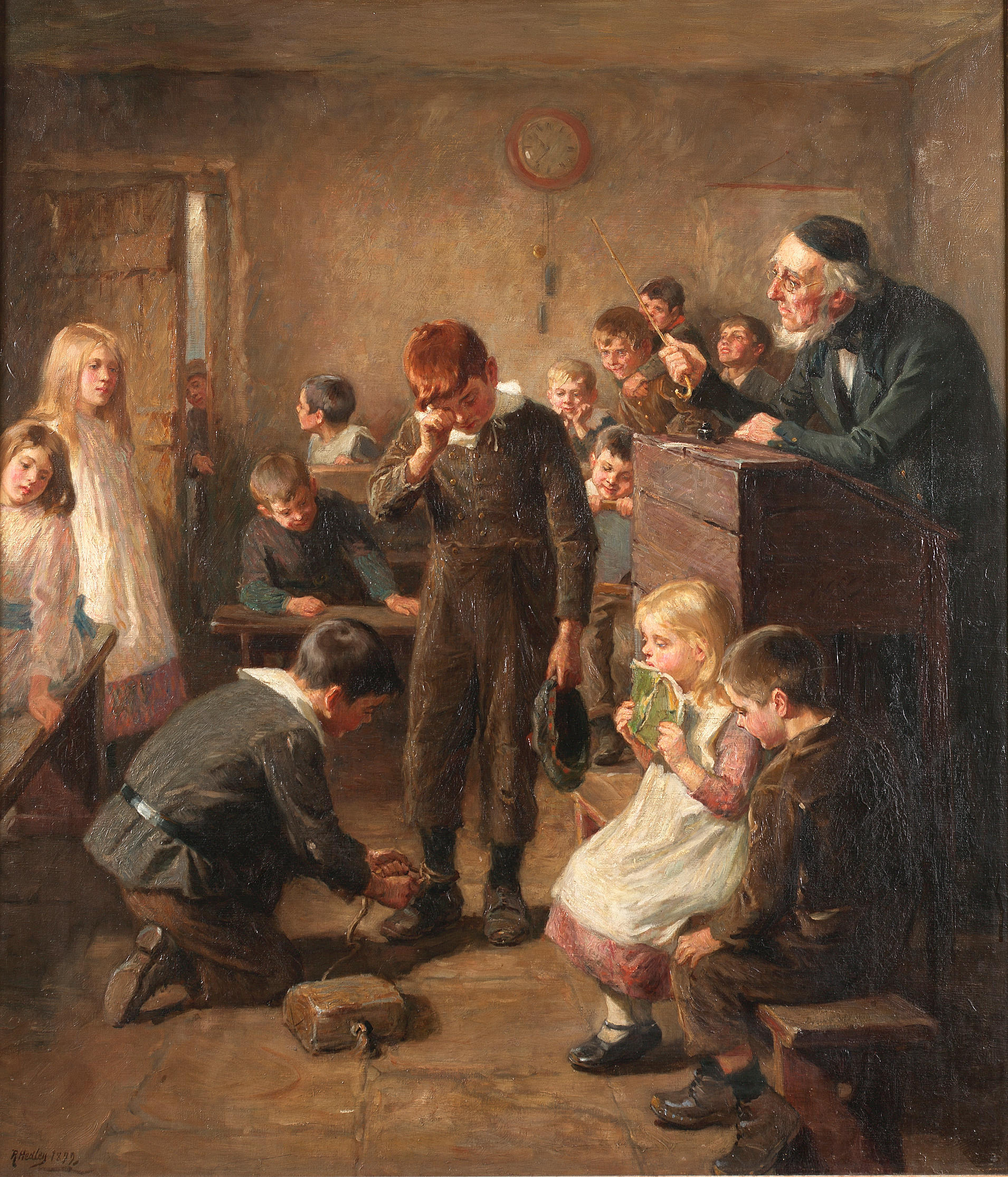
"The truant's log" (1899) painting by Ralph Henley depicts a schoolboy being punished for truancy

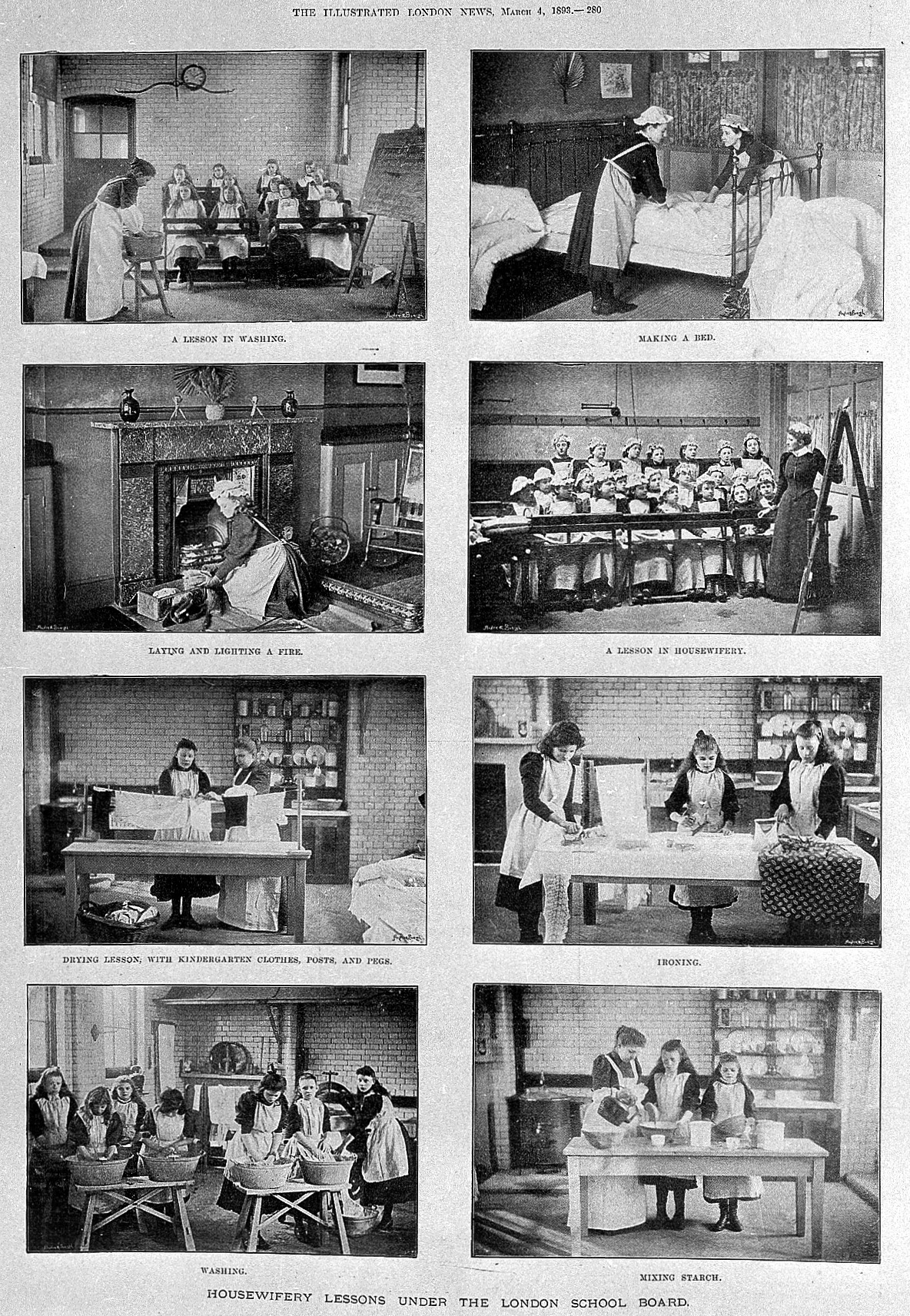
Photographs in the London illustrated news of girls receiving lessons in domestic skills (1883)

=== Elite education ===
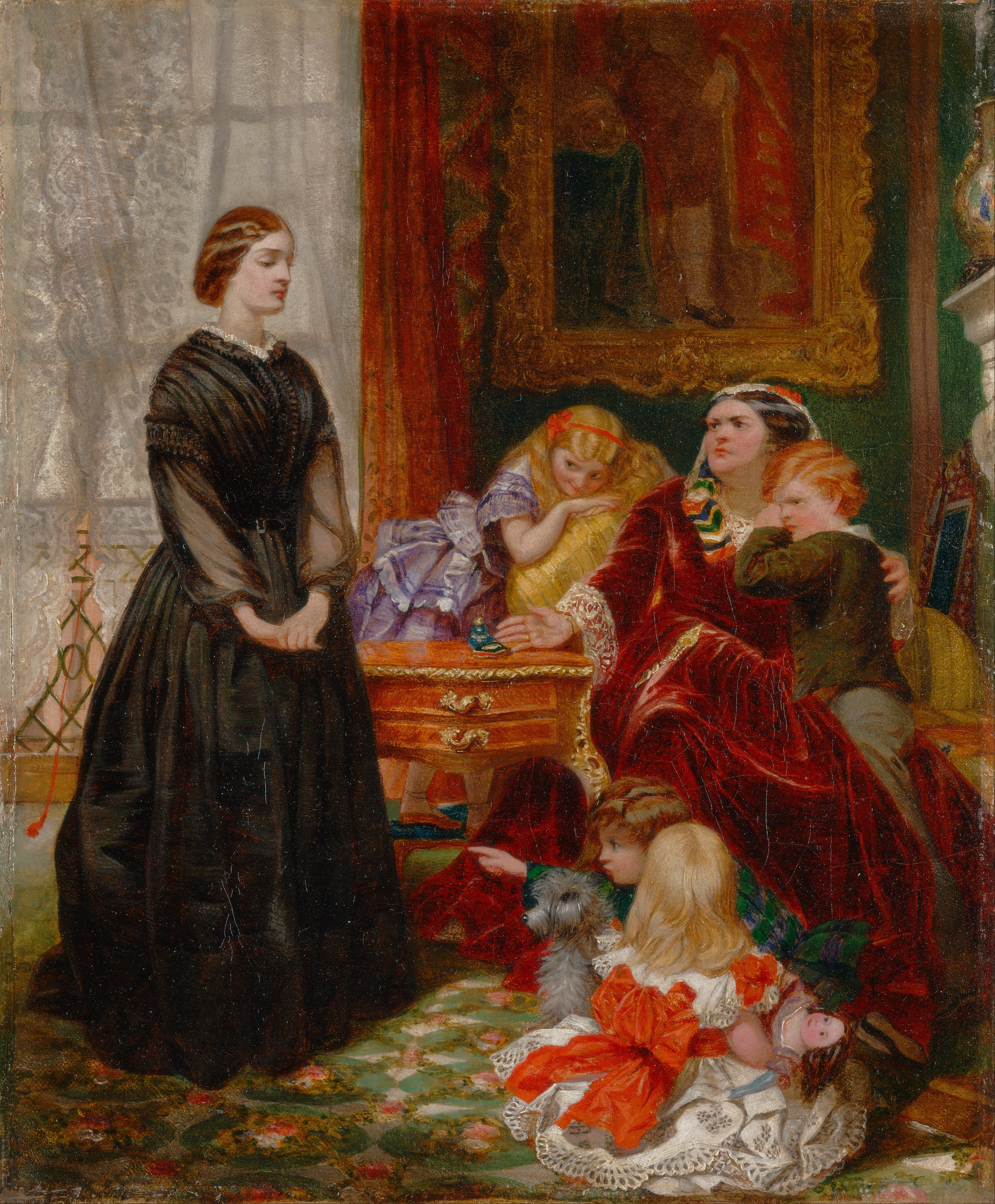
"The Governess" (1860) by Emily Mary Osborn, shows children with their mother and governess

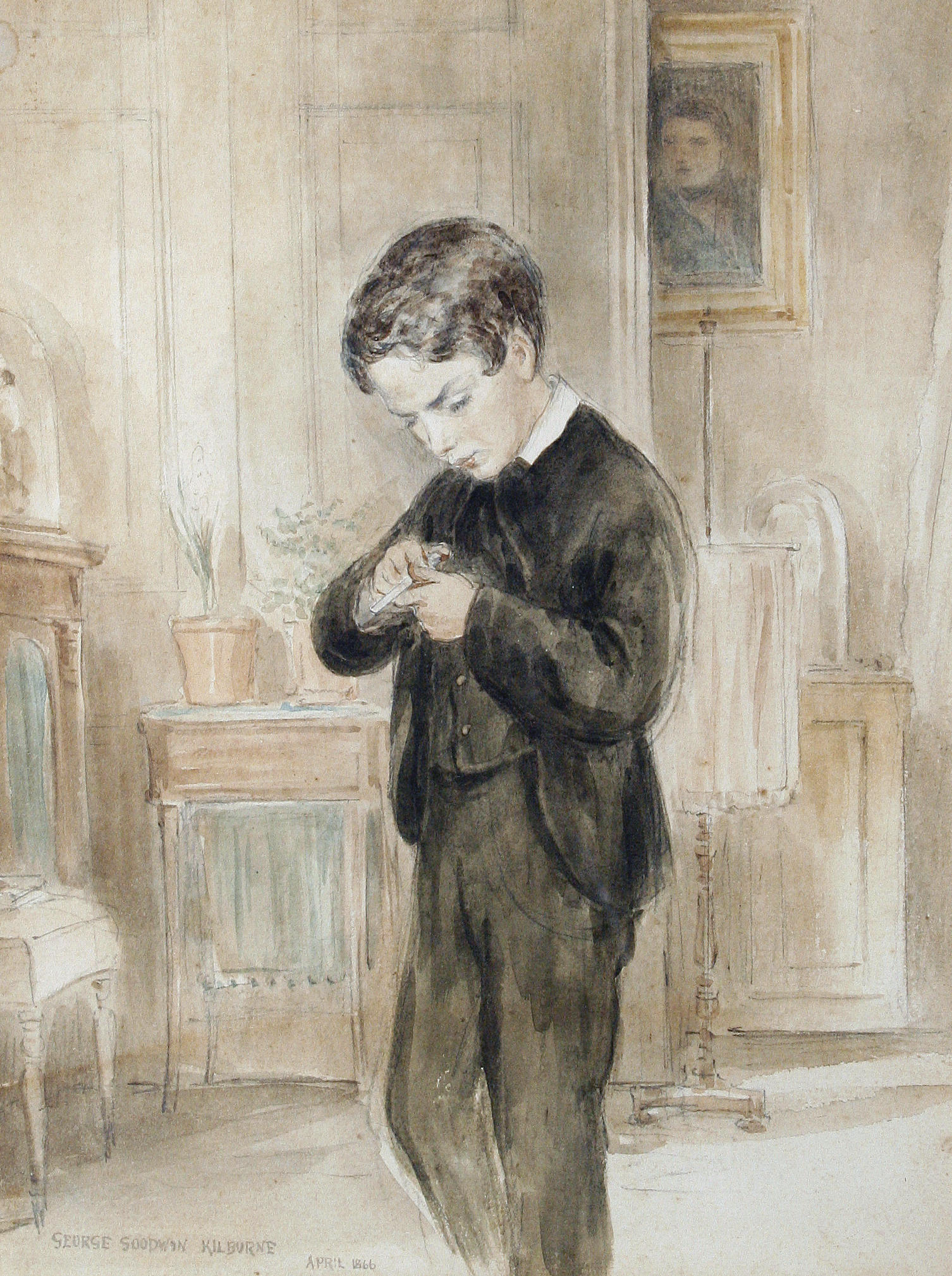
Depiction of a schoolboy at Eton College signed and dated 'George Edwin Kilburne April 1866'

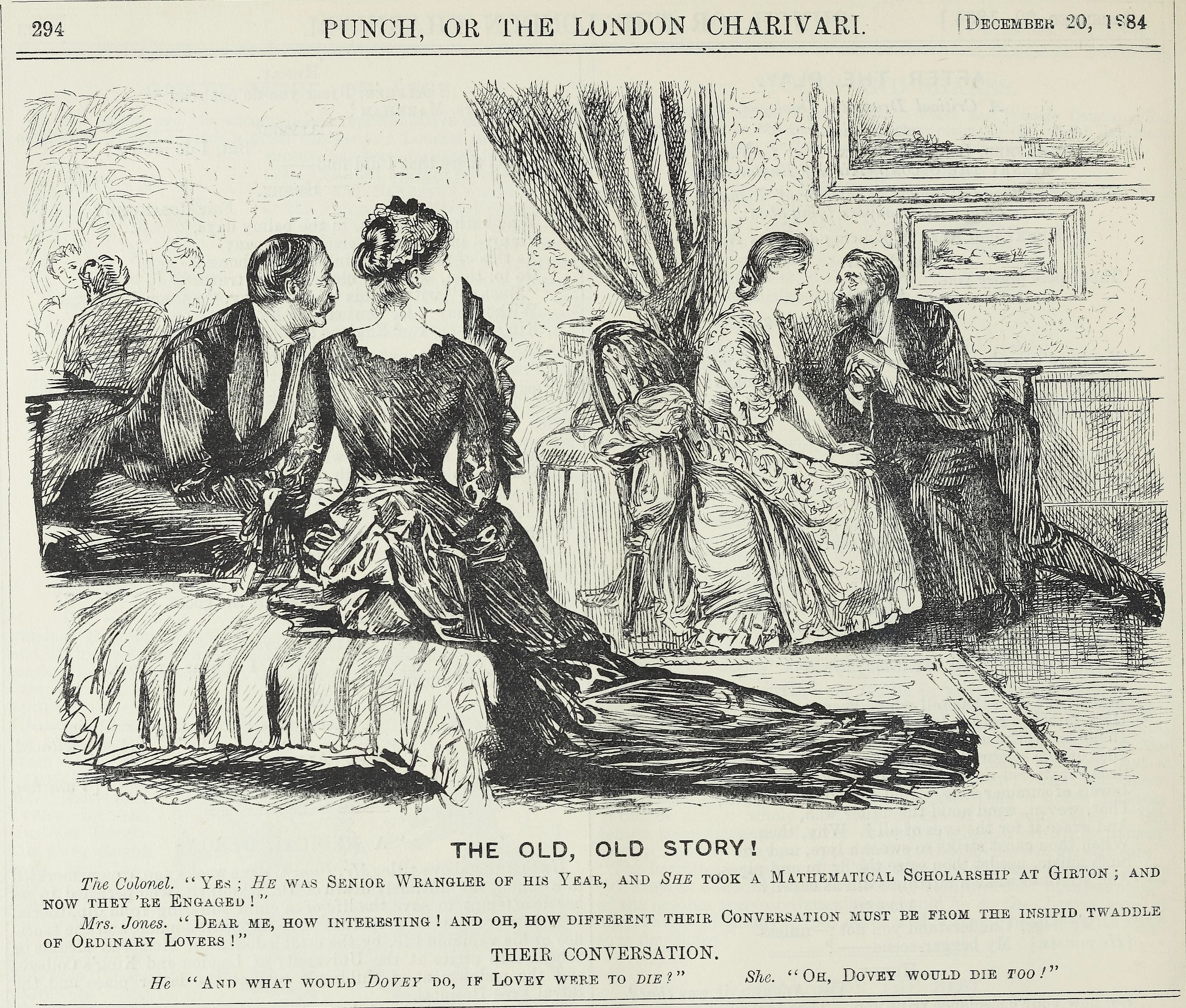
An 1884 cartoon from the humorous British magazine Punch lampooning a romance between a former Cambridge University Senior Wrangler and a former Girton College student

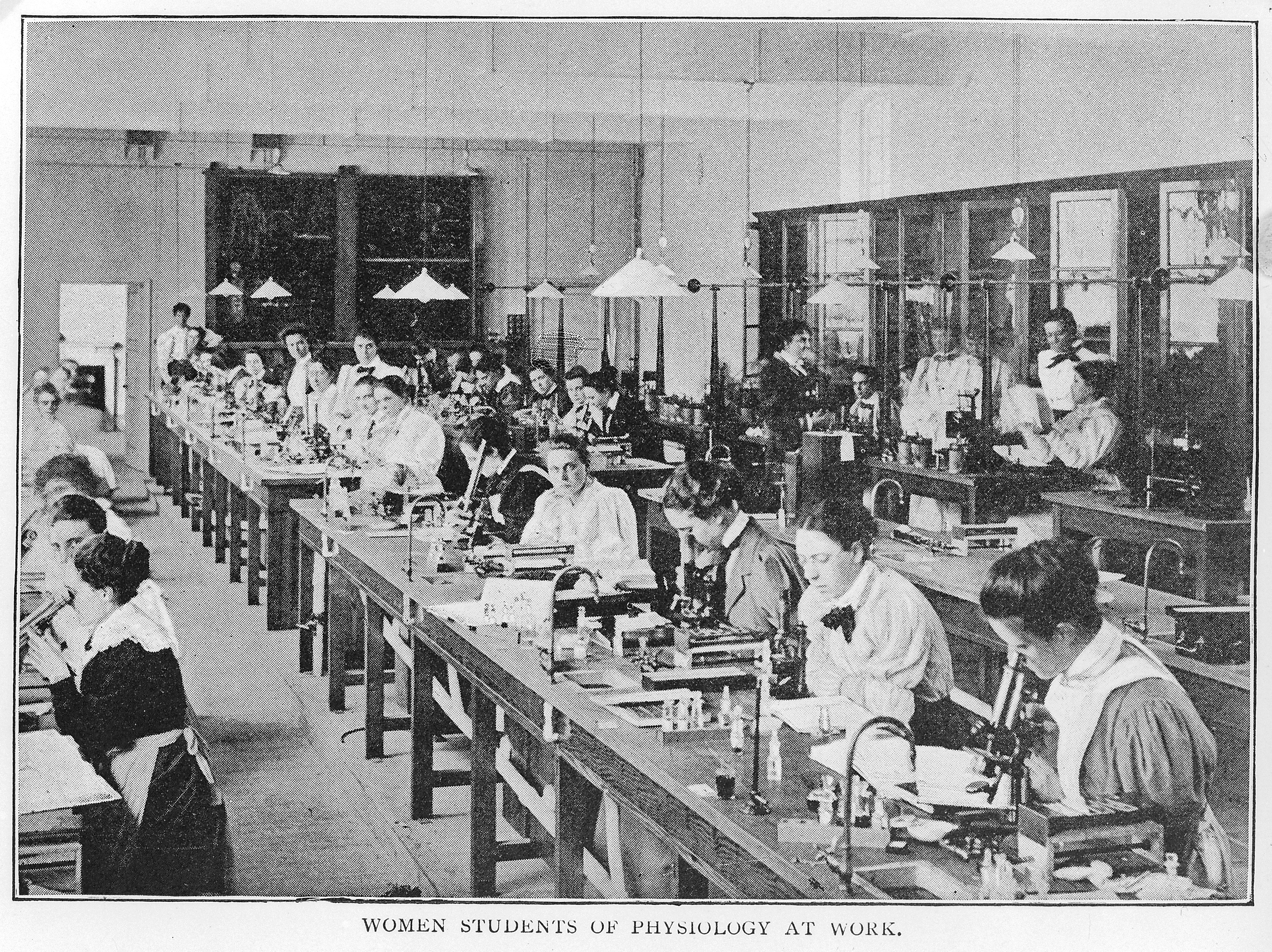
Women students of physiology studying in the London School of Medicine, Physiology Laboratory

During the first half of the 19th century, formal schooling became the norm for boys from wealthier families seen as necessary for future businessmen and increasingly professionals. Some were tutored at home or sent to endowed grammar schools but the growing number of private schools were increasingly popular with middle-class parents. Expensive public schools which had previously been the preserve of landowning families and associated with poor morality also became popular with social-climbing families. The era saw a reform and renaissance of public schools, inspired by Thomas Arnold at Rugby. The public school became a model for gentlemen and public service. Many of the boys who attended these schools went on to enter senior positions in government and civil society. Most girls from wealthier families were educated by governesses or at private schools. There was a steady trend to a more academic curriculum at private girls' schools. In the 1850s, the North London Collegiate School and Cheltenham Ladies' College were founded. Grammar schools for girls were founded beginning in the 1870s. By the turn of the century, some girls' schools were even aiming to prepare their students for university.

A key component of the curriculum at Cambridge since the mid-eighteenth century had been the "Mathematical Tripos," providing not just intensive training for mathematicians and scientists but also general education for future civil servants, colonial administrators, lawyers, and clergymen. Named after the three-legged stool students had been sitting on since the fifteenth century, the Tripos included extremely challenging and highly prestigious exams whose most successful candidate for a given year was called the "Senior Wrangler." Below the Senior and Second Wranglers were the Optimes. The exams concerned not just pure but also "mixed" or applied mathematics. Starting from the 1830s, under the influence of Master of Trinity College William Whewell, the "mixed" portion included only branches of applied mathematics deemed stable, such as mechanics and optics, rather those amenable to mathematical analysis but remained unfinished at the time, such as electricity and magnetism. Following recommendations from the Royal Commission of 1850–51, science education at Oxford and Cambridge underwent significant reforms. In 1851, a new Tripos was introduced, providing a broader and less mathematical program in "natural philosophy," or what science was still commonly called back then. By 1890, the Tripos had evolved into a rigorous test of not just mathematical ingenuity but also mental stamina. Topics ranged widely, from number theory to mathematical physics. Candidates needed to have a firm grasp of the works of Sir Isaac Newton and Euclid of Alexandria, trigonometric identities, conic sections, compounded interest, eclipses and more. They usually sat for five and a half hours each day for eight days for a total of a dozen papers featuring increasingly difficult questions.

In general, while the first colleges for women opened in the 1870s, it was not until the 1890s that they started to be permitted to study side by side with men and to sit for the same exams as men. The first college for women at the University of Cambridge, Girton, opened in 1873. However, women were only allowed to take exams; it was not until 1948 that they were able to receive degrees. They were marked and scored separately, however, and the results of female candidates were enunciated in comparison to men's, for instance, "between the 20th and 21st Optimes." Exam results from the 1860s onward suggested that women broadly did as well as men, though with the notable exception of mathematics. At that time, it was commonly thought that women were emotional creatures lacking the mental faculty to master mathematics. Thus it was big news when Philippa Fawcett was ranked "above the Senior Wranger" in 1890, scoring thirteen percent higher than the top male that year, Geoffrey Thomas Bennett. She was the first, and last, woman to score the highest on the Tripos.

While women were not welcomed in the world of medicine, this was not the case in nursing. In fact, nursing became even more respected after the brilliant exploits of Florence Nightingale during the Crimean War. Her nursing school at St Thomas' Hospital became a model for others. Consequently, for many middle-class young women, the prospects of being a nurse, one of the few career options open to them at the time, became much more appealing.

=== Reading culture ===
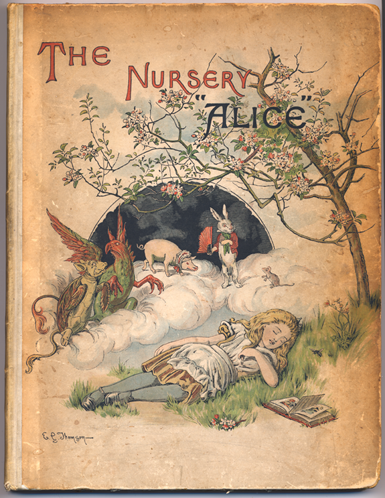
Cover illustration for Lewis Carroll's The Nursery "Alice" by E. Gertrude Thomson published by Macmillan in 1890 in London

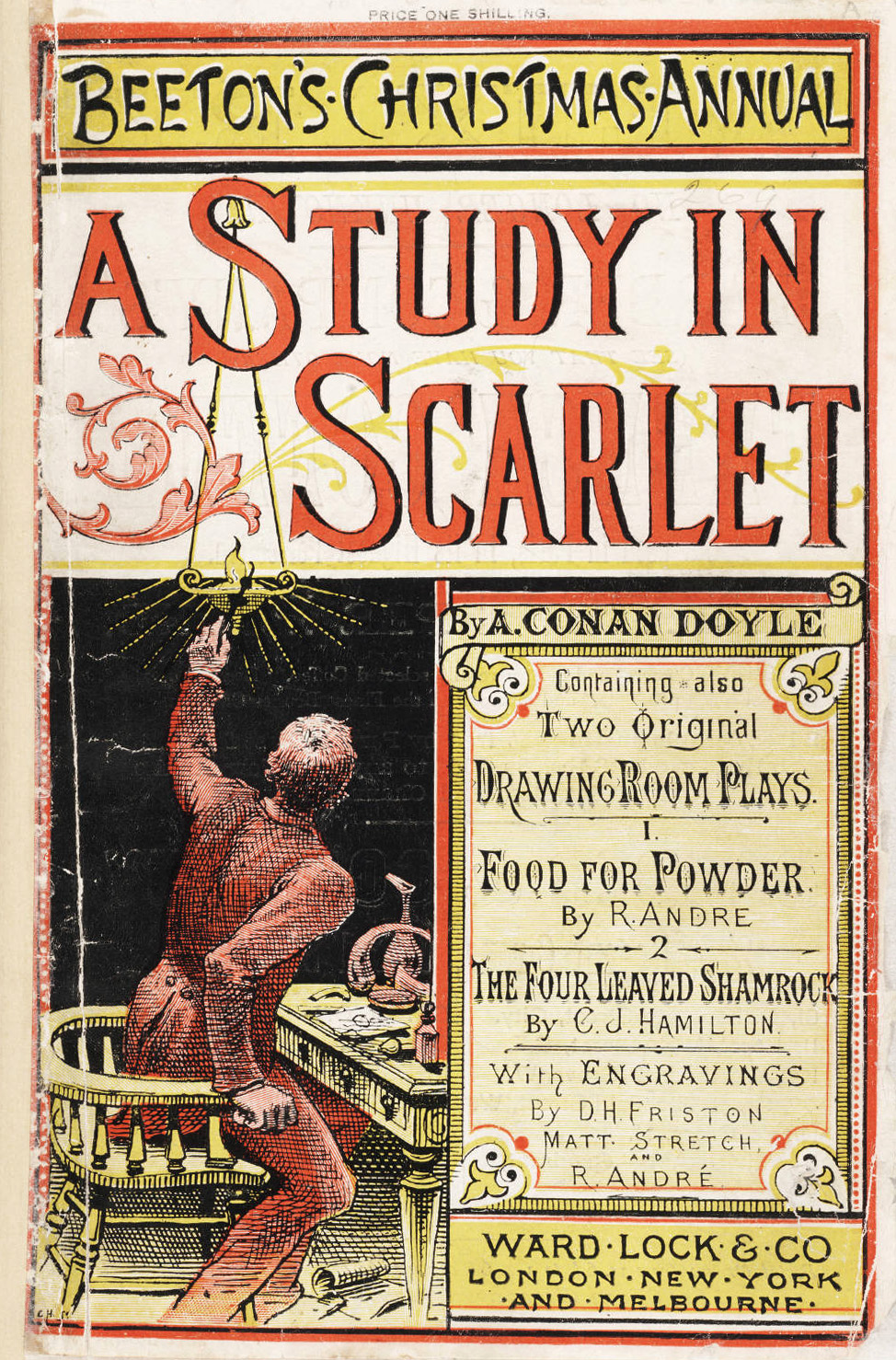
The 1887 edition of Beeton's Christmas Annual contains Arthur Conan Doyle's A Study in Scarlet, the first appearance of the fictional detective Sherlock Holmes.

Page 157 from Somerville's Mechanism discussing Kepler's laws

During the nineteenth century, the publishing industry found itself catching up with the momentous changes to society brought about by the Industrial Revolution. It benefited from the introduction of electrical power, rail transport, and telegraphy. Sales of books and periodicals were fuelled by the seemingly insatiable demand for knowledge, self-improvement, and entertainment from the rapidly growing middle-class.

Initially, while book prices were too high for the average reader, they were sufficient to cover the costs of the publisher and to pay reasonable amounts to the authors. But as free-to-use libraries sprang up all around the country, people started flocking to them. Authors and publishers looked for ways to cut prices and increase sales. Serialisation in periodicals, especially literary magazines though not newspapers, became popular. Quality illustrations were commissioned from the reputable artists of the time as an incentive to purchase. Income from writing increased for some writers, and many became professional novelists.

In the early 1800s, the market for children's literature was dominated by religious groups. Stories from this period often included strong a moral message. But it showed signs of growth and some writers decided to seize the opportunity. By the middle of the century, commercial publishers came to recognise the great potential of this market and signed deals with gifted authors to provide a plethora of reading materials to children. They also took advantage of innovations such as those that enable the printing of coloured illustrations. As the middle class boomed, people had more money to spend on entertaining their children. Moral messaging was de-emphasised in favor of fun. Classics like the tales of the Brothers Grimm and the fairy tales of Hans Christian Andersen made their way to the printing press. But it was Alice's Adventures in Wonderland (1865) by Lewis Carroll that proved to be the most popular, alongside the works of William Makepeace Thackeray, Charles Kingsley, Jean Ingelow, and George Macdonald. By the 1880s, juvenile fiction packed with action and adventure became commonplace. Fantasy did not have a monopoly on the market for children's literature, however. Tom Brown's School Days (1857) by Thomas Hughes was a noteworthy example of realistic writing and school stories while Black Beauty (1877) by Anna Sewell was the start of the blooming of animal tales. As a matter of fact, the market grew so large that most of the top writers of the era wrote at least one book for children. Children's magazines and poetry for children (especially the nonsensical variety) blossomed during the Victorian age.

In prose, the novel rose from a position of relative neglect during the 1830s to become the leading literary genre by the end of the era. In the 1830s and 1840s, the social novel (also "Condition-of-England novels") addressed the Condition-of-England question, which was raised by Carlyle in Chartism (1839), Past and Present (1843) and Latter-Day Pamphlets (1850) to address the social, political and economic upheavals associated with industrialisation. Though it remained influential throughout the period, there was a notable resurgence of Gothic fiction in the fin de siècle, such as in Robert Louis Stevenson's novella Strange Case of Dr Jekyll and Mr Hyde (1886) and Oscar Wilde's The Picture of Dorian Gray (1891).

Following the bicentenary of William Shakespeare in 1769, the popularity of his works steadily grew, reaching a peak in the nineteenth century. Charles and Mary Lamb appeared to have anticipated this with their Tales from Shakespeare (1807). Intended as an introduction for apprentice readers to the works of the great playwright, the book became one of the best-selling titles in literature of the century, being republished multiple times.

As early as 1830, astronomer John Herschel had already recognised the need for the genre of popular science. In a letter to philosopher William Whewell, he wrote that the general public needed "digests of what is actually known in each particular branch of science... to give a connected view of what has been done, and what remains to be accomplished." Indeed, as the British population became not just increasingly literate but also well-educated, there was growing demand for science titles. Mary Somerville became an early and highly successful science writer of the nineteenth century. Her On the Connexion of the Physical Sciences (1834), intended for the mass audience, sold quite well. Arguably one of the first books in the genre of popular science, it contained few diagrams and very little mathematics. It had ten editions and was translated to multiple languages. As its name suggests, it offered readers a broad overview of the physical sciences at a time when these studies were becoming increasingly distinct and specialised. It was the most popular science title from the publisher John Murray until Charles Darwin's On the Origin of Species (1859). Although Somerville's rendition of Pierre-Simon de Laplace's masterpiece Mécanique Céleste, The Mechanism of the Heavens (1831), was intended to inform the masses of the latest advances in Newtonian mechanics and gravitation, it was also used as a textbook for students at the University of Cambridge till the 1880s.

The abolition of the newspaper stamp duty in 1855 and the advertising tax in 1858 paved the way for not only cheaper magazines but also those catering to a variety of interests. During the final three decades of the Victorian era, women's newspapers and magazines flourished and increasingly covered topics other than domestic issues, reflecting the trend among women at the time.

The professional police force dedicated to not just the prevention but also the investigation of crime took shape during the mid-nineteenth century. This development inspired Charles Dickens to write the crime novel Bleak House (1852–3), creating the first fictional detective, Mr. Bucket, based on a real-life character by the name of Charles Field. But it was Arthur Conan Doyle's Sherlock Holmes who proved to be the most popular fictional detective of the Victorian age, and indeed, of all times.

By the 1860s, there was strong demand for adventure, detective, sensational, and science-fiction novels. Indeed, the late nineteenth century saw a tremendous amount of technological progress, which inspired authors to write in the genre of science fiction. H. G. Wells' The Time Machine (1895) was a commercial success; in it, he introduced the notion of time travel. In some instances, science fiction inspired new technology and scientific research. Explorer Ernest Shackleton acknowledged that the novel Twenty Thousand Leagues Under the Sea by Jules Verne was an inspiration.

As reading became more pronounced in the 19th century with public notes, broadsides, catchpennies and printed songs becoming common street literature, it informed and entertained the public before newspapers became readily available in the later 19th century. Advertisements and local news, such as offers of rewards for catching criminals or for the return of stolen goods, appeared on public notices and handbills, while cheaply printed sheets – broadsheets and ballads – covered political or criminal news such murders, trials, executions, disasters and rescues. Chapbooks would also be common place, these were simple reading matter that were small, cheap forms of literature for children and adults that were sold on the streets, their subjects included fiction writing to disaster updates. Their readership would have been largely among the poor, and among children of the middle class.

== Entertainment ==
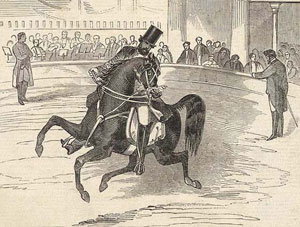
Pablo Fanque performing at Astley's Amphitheatre, 1847

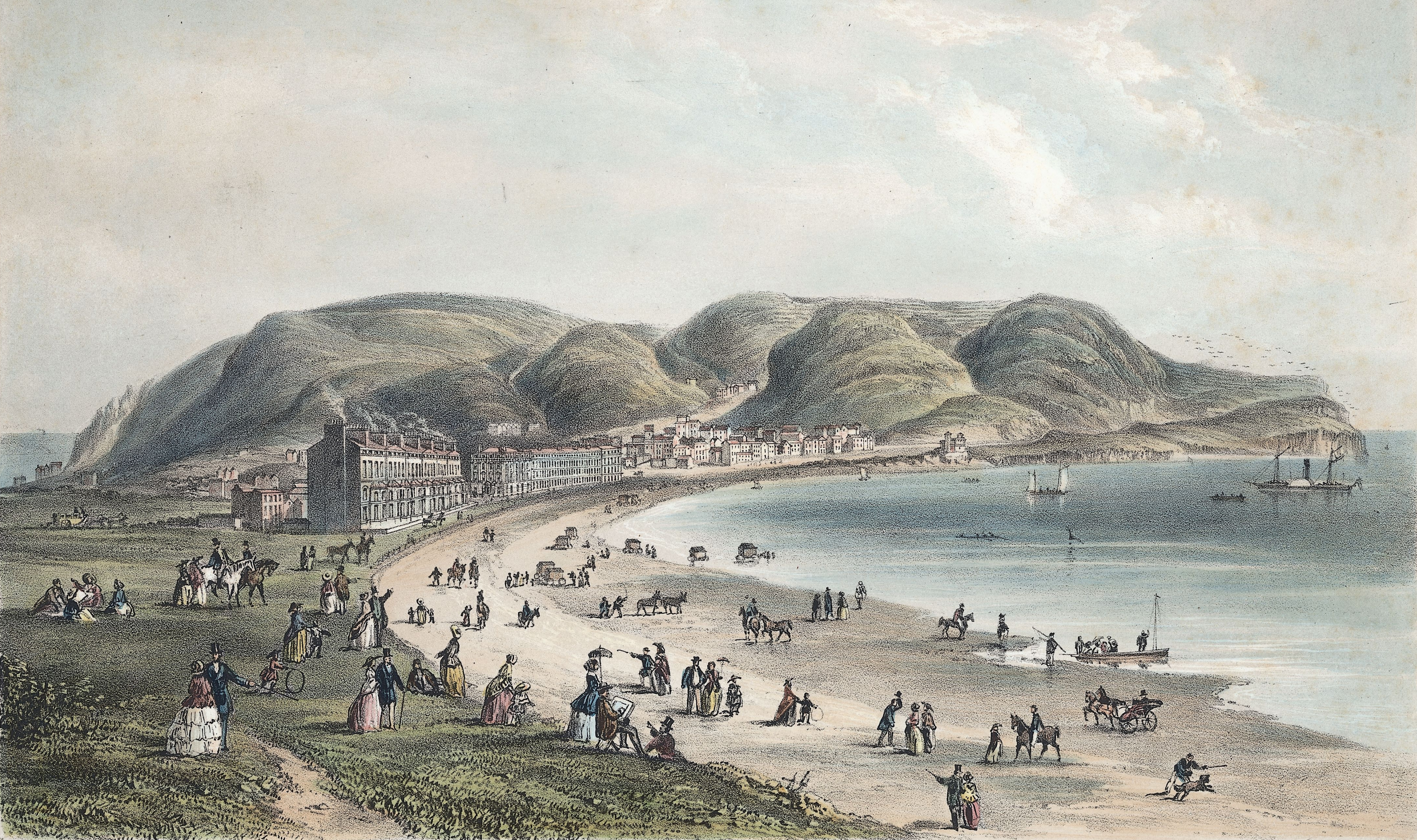
Llandudno, 1856. With the arrival of the railway network, seaside towns became popular destinations for Victorian holiday makers

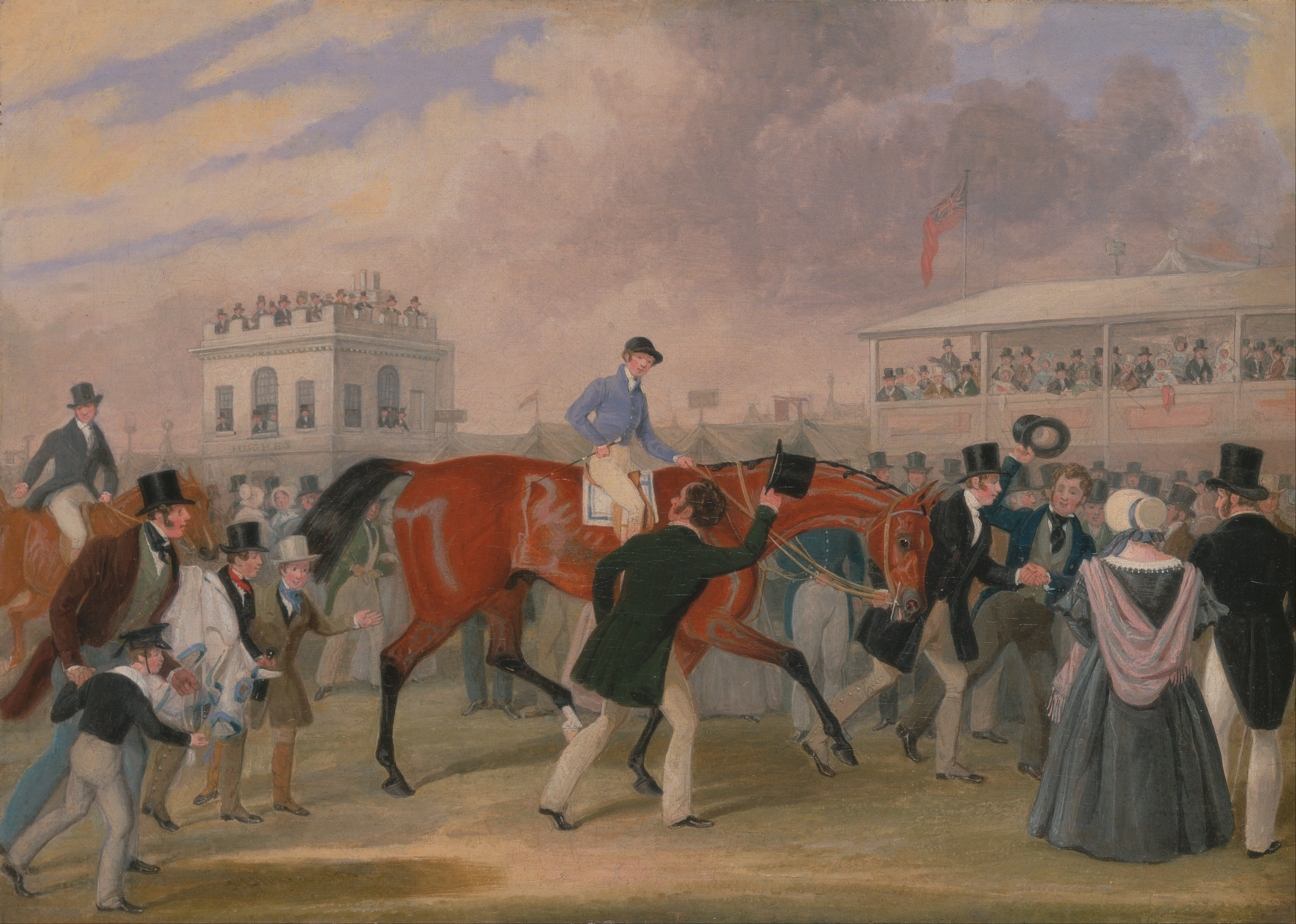
The Epsom Derby; painting by James Pollard, c. 1840

Popular forms of entertainment varied by social class. Victorian Britain, like the periods before it, was interested in literature, theatre and the arts (see Aesthetic movement and Pre-Raphaelite Brotherhood), and music, drama, and opera were widely attended. Michael Balfe was the most popular British grand opera composer of the period, while the most popular musical theatre was a series of fourteen comic operas by Gilbert and Sullivan, although there was also musical burlesque and the beginning of Edwardian musical comedy in the 1890s.

Drama ranged from low comedy to Shakespeare (see Henry Irving). Melodrama—literally 'musical drama'—was introduced in Revolutionary France and reached Great Britain from there during the Victorian era. It was a particularly widespread and influential theatrical genre thanks to its appeal to the working-class and artisans. However, its popularity decline in the late nineteenth century. Even so, it continued to influence the novels of the era.

Gentlemen went to dining clubs, like the Beefsteak Club or the Savage Club. Gambling at cards in establishments popularly called casinos was wildly popular during the period: so much so that evangelical and reform movements specifically targeted such establishments in their efforts to stop gambling, drinking, and prostitution.

Brass bands and 'The Bandstand' became popular in the Victorian era. The bandstand was a simple construction that not only created an ornamental focal point but also served acoustic requirements whilst providing shelter from the changeable British weather. It was common to hear the sound of a brass band whilst strolling through parklands. At this time musical recording was still very much a novelty.

The Victorian era marked the golden age of the British circus. Astley's Amphitheatre in Lambeth, London, featuring equestrian acts in a 42-foot wide circus ring, was the center of the 19th-century circus. The permanent structure sustained three fires but as an institution lasted a full century, with Andrew Ducrow and William Batty managing the theatre in the middle part of the century. William Batty would also build his 14,000-person arena, known commonly as Batty's Hippodrome, in Kensington Gardens, and draw crowds from the Crystal Palace Exhibition. Traveling circuses, like Pablo Fanque's, dominated the British provinces, Scotland, and Ireland (Fanque would enjoy fame again in the 20th century when John Lennon would buy an 1843 poster advertising his circus and adapt the lyrics for The Beatles song, Being for the Benefit of Mr. Kite!). Fanque also stands out as a black man who achieved great success and enjoyed great admiration among the British public only a few decades after Britain had abolished slavery.

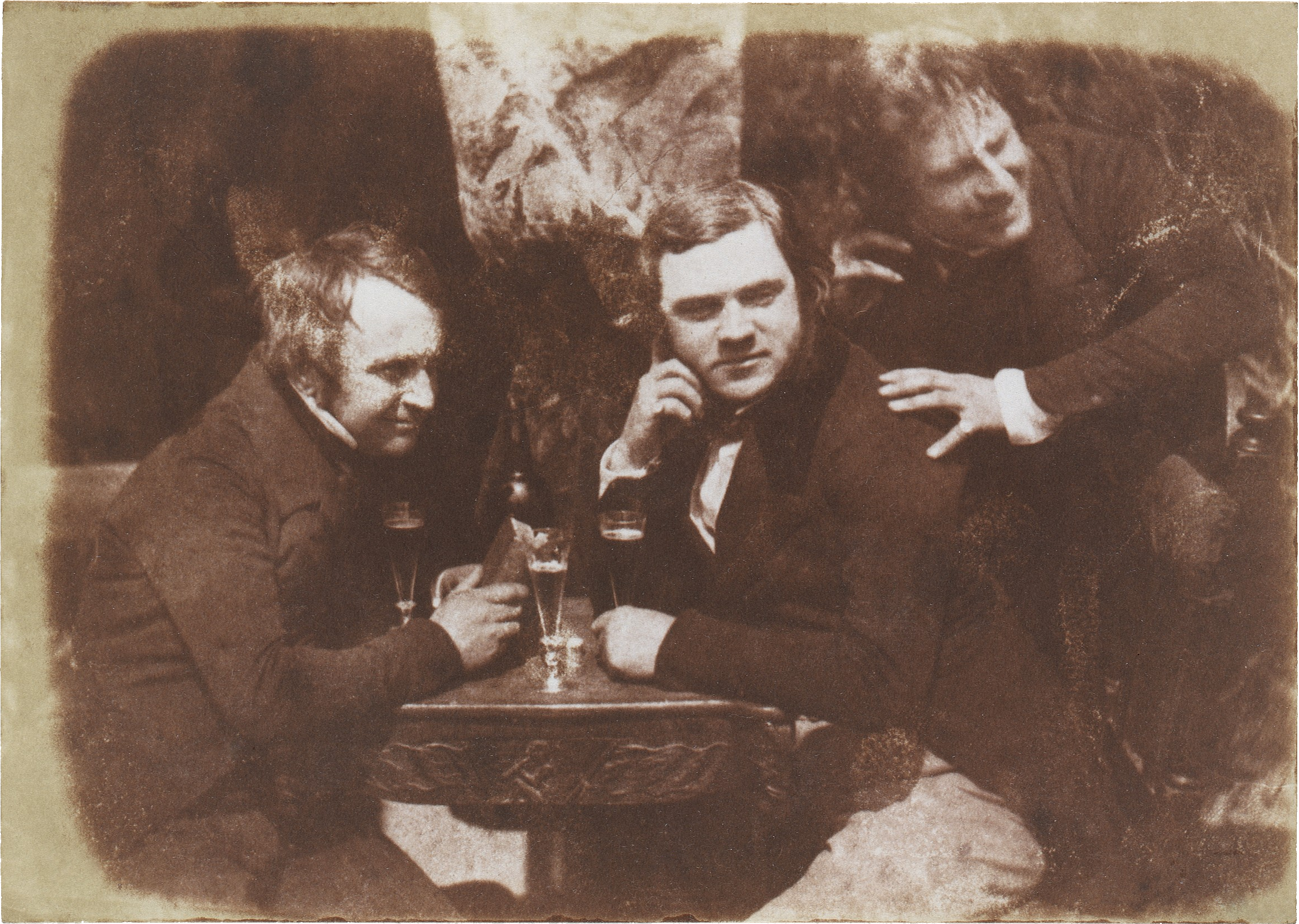
Edinburgh Ale, 1844 by David Octavius Hill and Robert Adamson.

Another form of entertainment involved "spectacles" where paranormal events, such as mesmerism, communication with the dead (by way of mediumship or channeling), ghost conjuring and the like, were carried out to the delight of crowds and participants. Such activities were more popular at this time than in other periods of recent Western history.

Natural history became increasingly an "amateur" activity. Particularly in Britain and the United States, this grew into specialist hobbies such as the study of birds, butterflies, seashells (malacology/conchology), beetles and wildflowers. Amateur collectors and natural history entrepreneurs played an important role in building the large natural history collections of the nineteenth and early twentieth centuries.

Middle-class Victorians used the train services to visit the seaside, helped by the Bank Holiday Act of 1871, which created many fixed holidays. Large numbers traveling to quiet fishing villages such as Worthing, Morecambe and Scarborough began turning them into major tourist centres, and people like Thomas Cook saw tourism and even overseas travel as viable businesses.

=== Sports ===
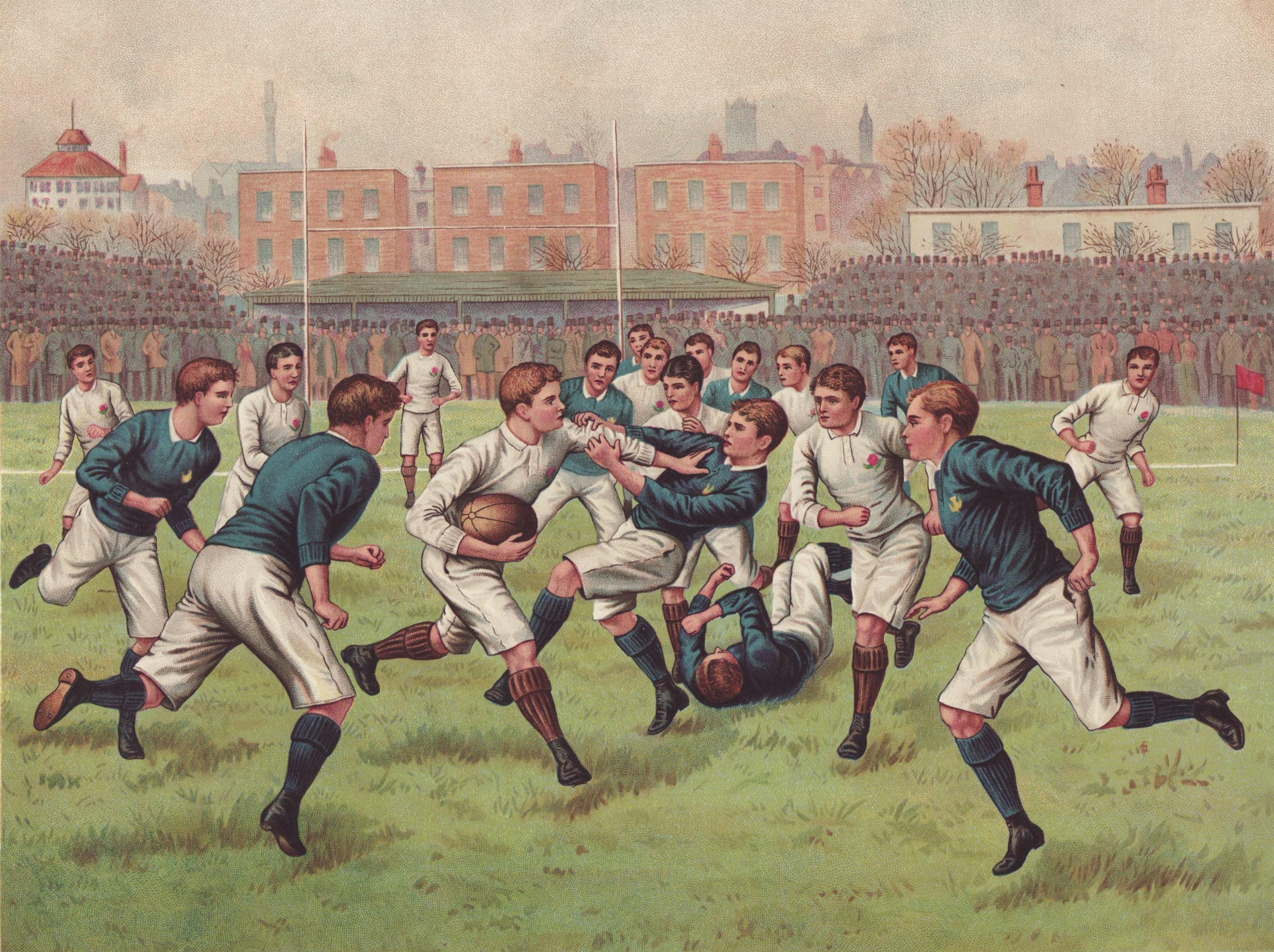
Rugby football match between England and Scotland, c. 1880

The Victorian era saw the introduction and development of many modern sports. Often originating in the public schools, they exemplified new ideals of manliness. Cricket, cycling, croquet, horse-riding, and many water activities are examples of some of the popular sports in the Victorian era.

The modern game of tennis originated in Birmingham, England, between 1859 and 1865. The world's oldest tennis tournament, the Wimbledon championships, was first played in London in 1877. Britain was an active competitor in all the Olympic Games starting in 1896.

== High culture ==
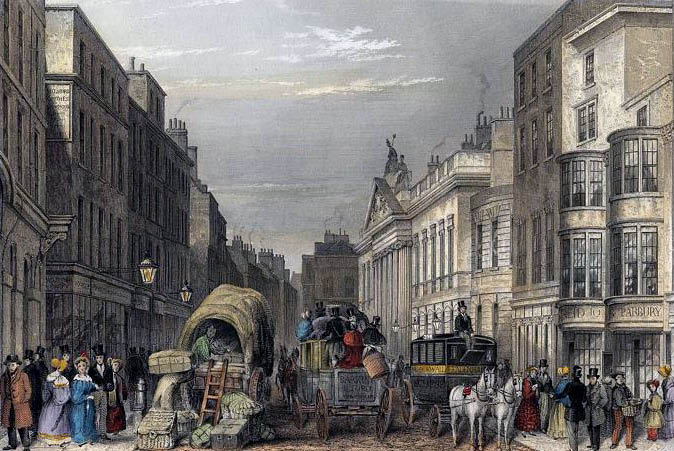
A picture of Leadenhall Street, London, c. 1837

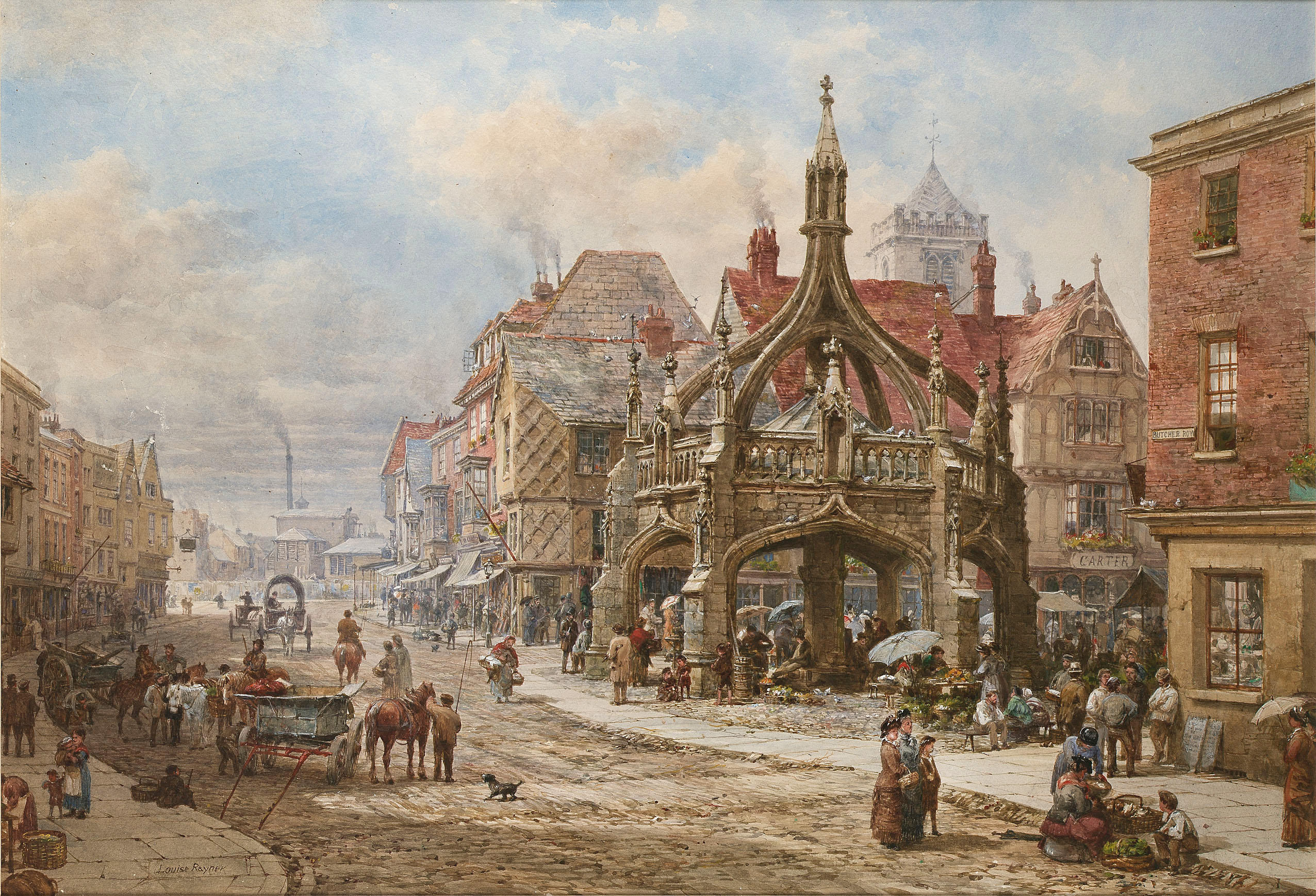
The Poultry Cross, Salisbury, painted by Louise Rayner, c. 1870

Gothic Revival architecture became increasingly significant during the period, leading to the Battle of the Styles between Gothic and Classical ideals. Charles Barry's architecture for the new Palace of Westminster, which had been badly damaged in an 1834 fire, was built in the medieval style of Westminster Hall, the surviving part of the building. It constructed a narrative of cultural continuity, set in opposition to the violent disjunctions of Revolutionary France, a comparison common to the period, as expressed in Carlyle's The French Revolution: A History (1837) and Charles Dickens' A Tale of Two Cities (1859) and Great Expectations (1861). Gothic was also supported by critic John Ruskin, who argued that it epitomised communal and inclusive social values, as opposed to Classicism, which he considered to epitomise mechanical standardisation.

The middle of the 19th century saw The Great Exhibition of 1851, the first World's Fair, which showcased the greatest innovations of the century. At its centre was the Crystal Palace, a modular glass and iron structure – the first of its kind. It was condemned by Ruskin as the very model of mechanical dehumanisation in design and later came to be presented as the prototype of Modern architecture. The emergence of photography, showcased at the Great Exhibition, resulted in significant changes in Victorian art with Queen Victoria being the first British monarch to be photographed.

In general, various styles of painting were popular during the Victorian period, Classicism, Neoclassicism, Romanticism, Impressionism, and Post-impressionism. In 1848, Dante Rossetti and William Holman Hunt created the Pre-Raphaelite Brotherhood whose stated aim was to produce paintings of photographic quality, taking inspiration from a variety of sources, from the works of William Shakespeare to Mother Nature herself. The growing popularity of romantic love spilled over into literature and fine arts.

Victorian design also extended into domestic interiors, where muted, neutral and warm color schemes were widely favored. An 1893 interior design article, titled "Inexpensive Decorations For Dining Rooms" recommended mixing “a trifle of Prussian Blue, with black and white” to create a warm and inviting dining room, the mixing of vibrant colors like Prussian blue with muted colors was a common practice in order to create duller colors coinciding with the design tastes of the time period. The "inexpensive" design recommendations also illustrate the growing influence of the Victorian middle class, where the private home was central to comfort, domestic life and social entertaining.

=== Gallery of selected Victorian paintings ===
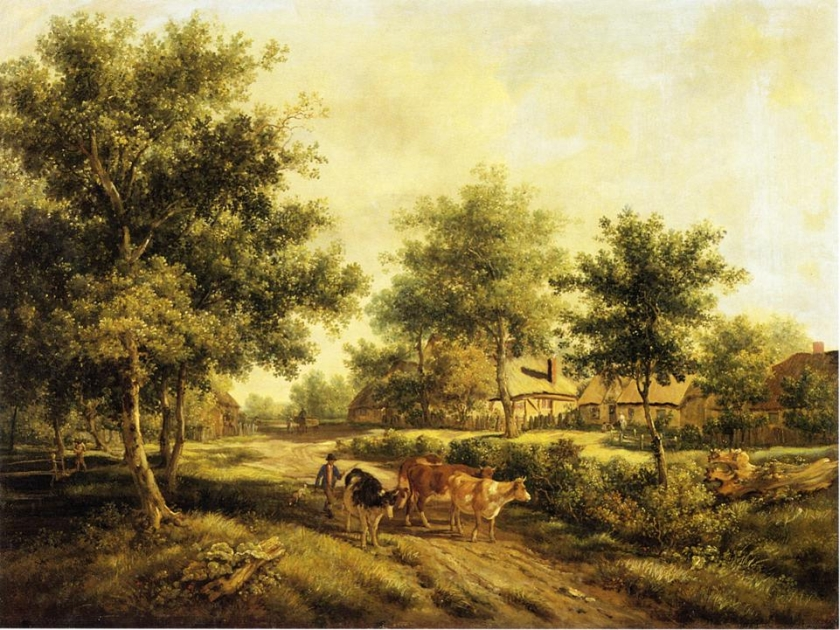
Norfolk Hamlet (1840) by Henry John Boddington

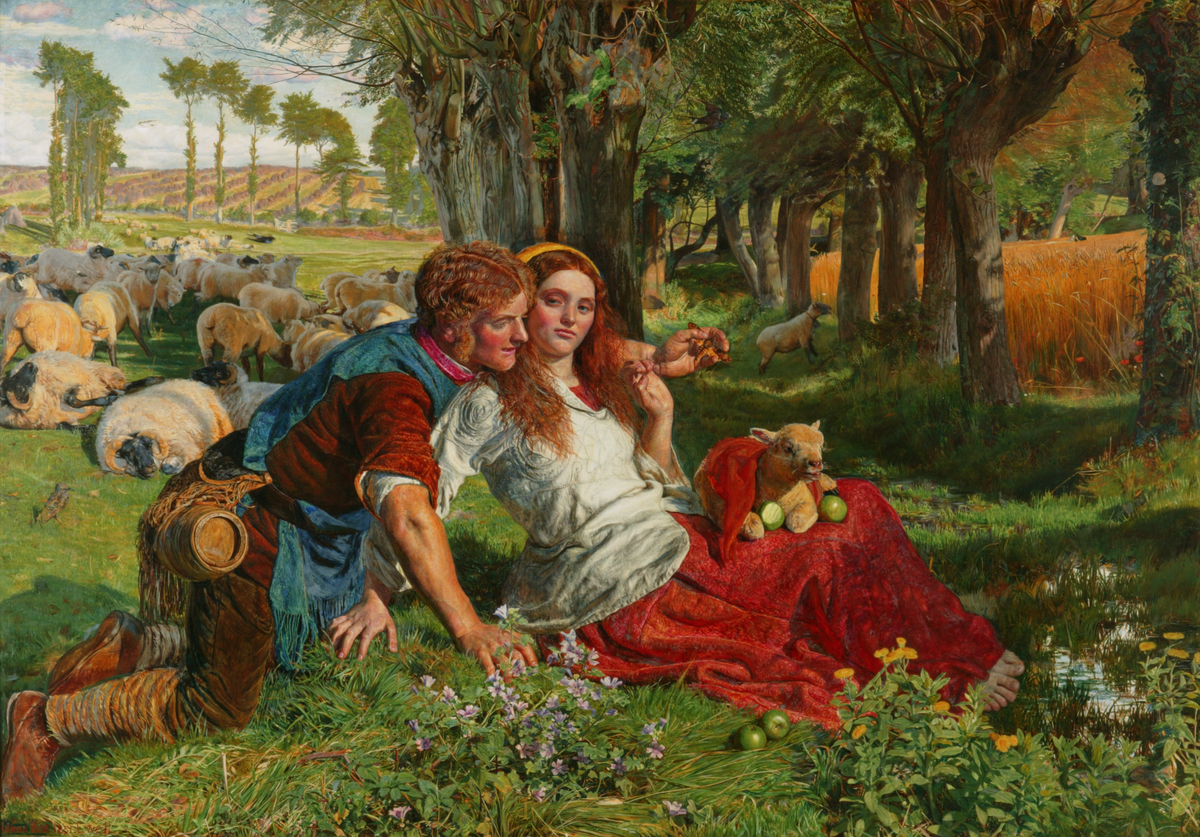
The Hireling Shepherd (1851) by William Holman Hunt

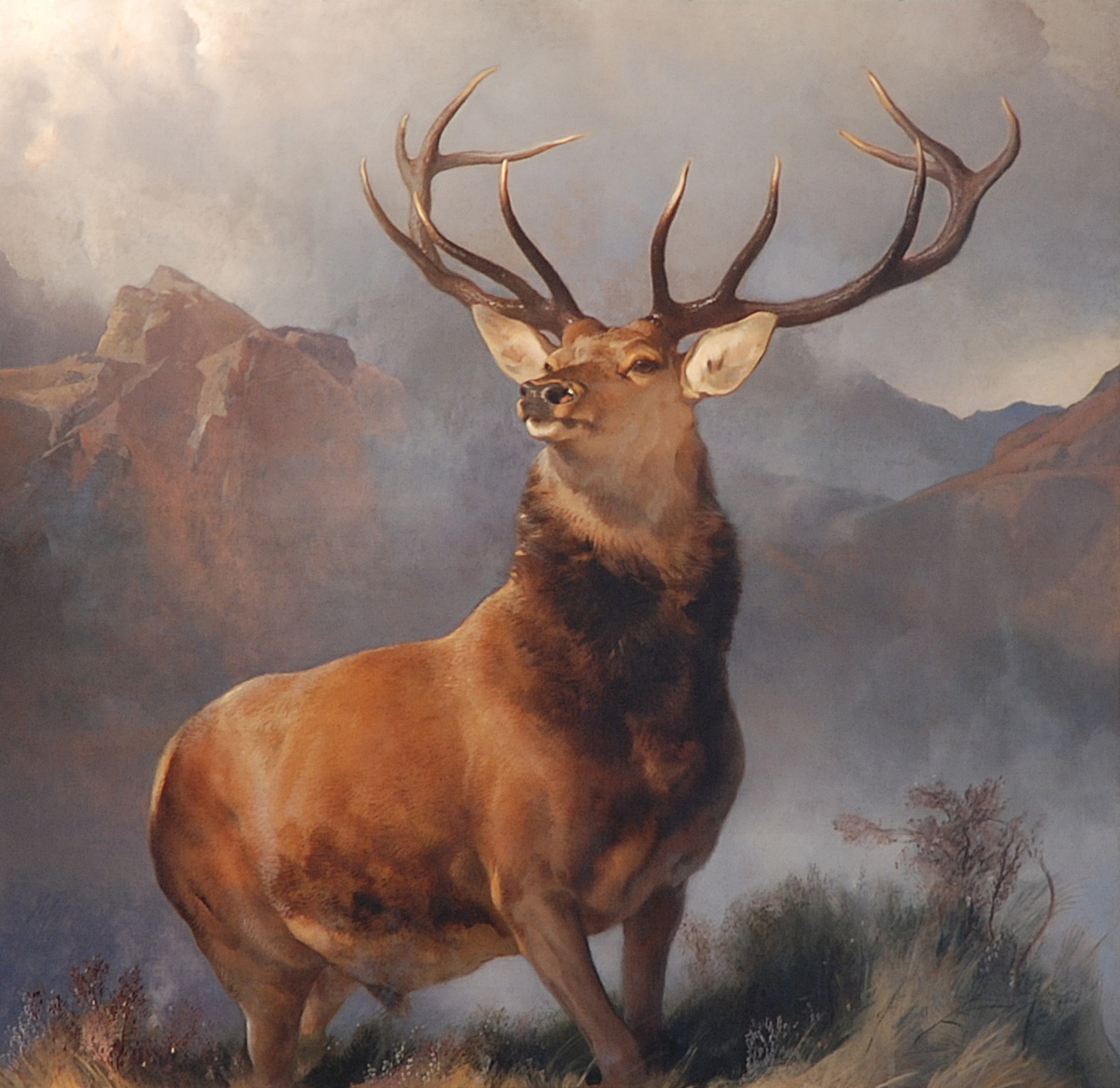
Monarch of the Glen (1851) by Edwin Landseer

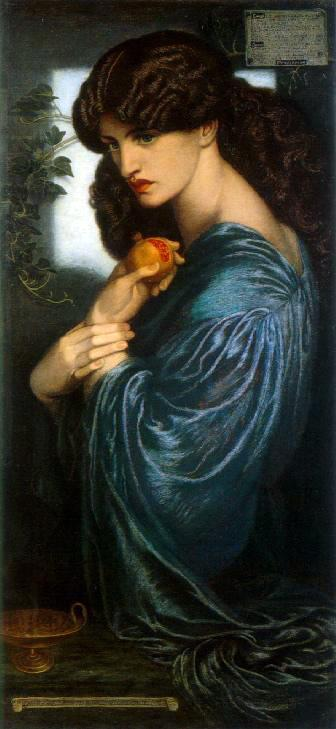
Proserpine (1874) by Dante Rossetti

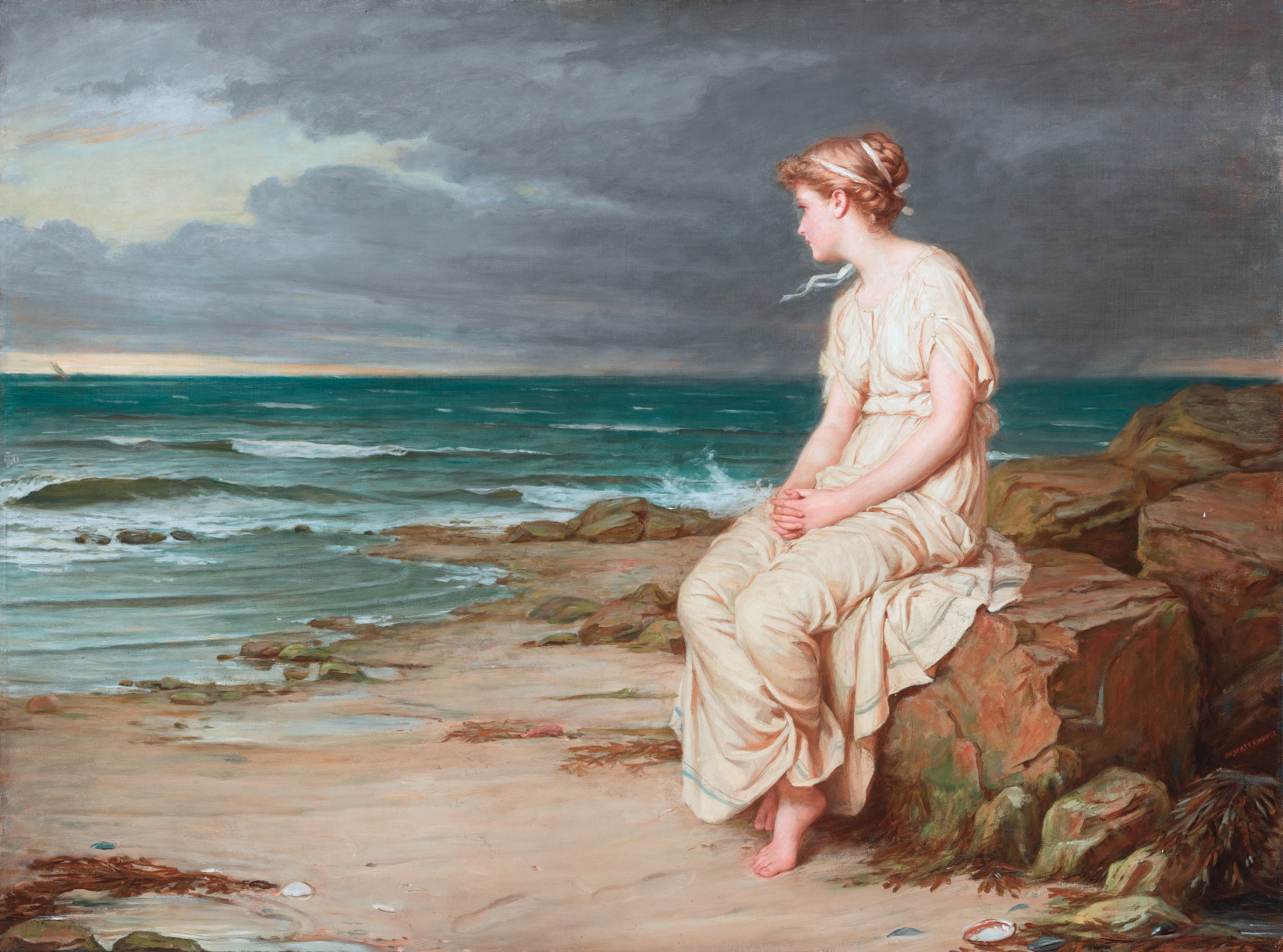
Miranda (1875) by John William Waterhouse

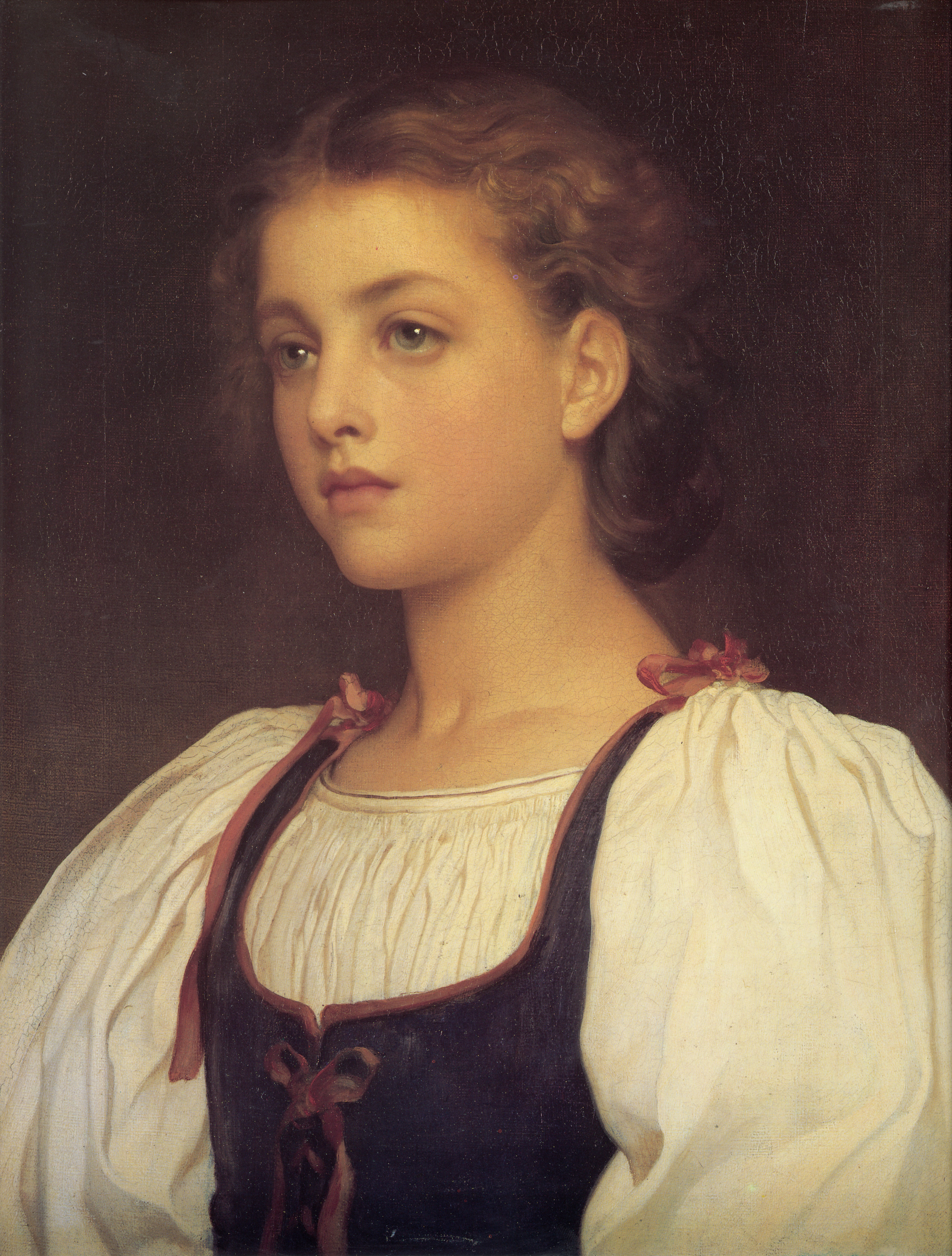
Biondina (1879) by Frederick Leighton

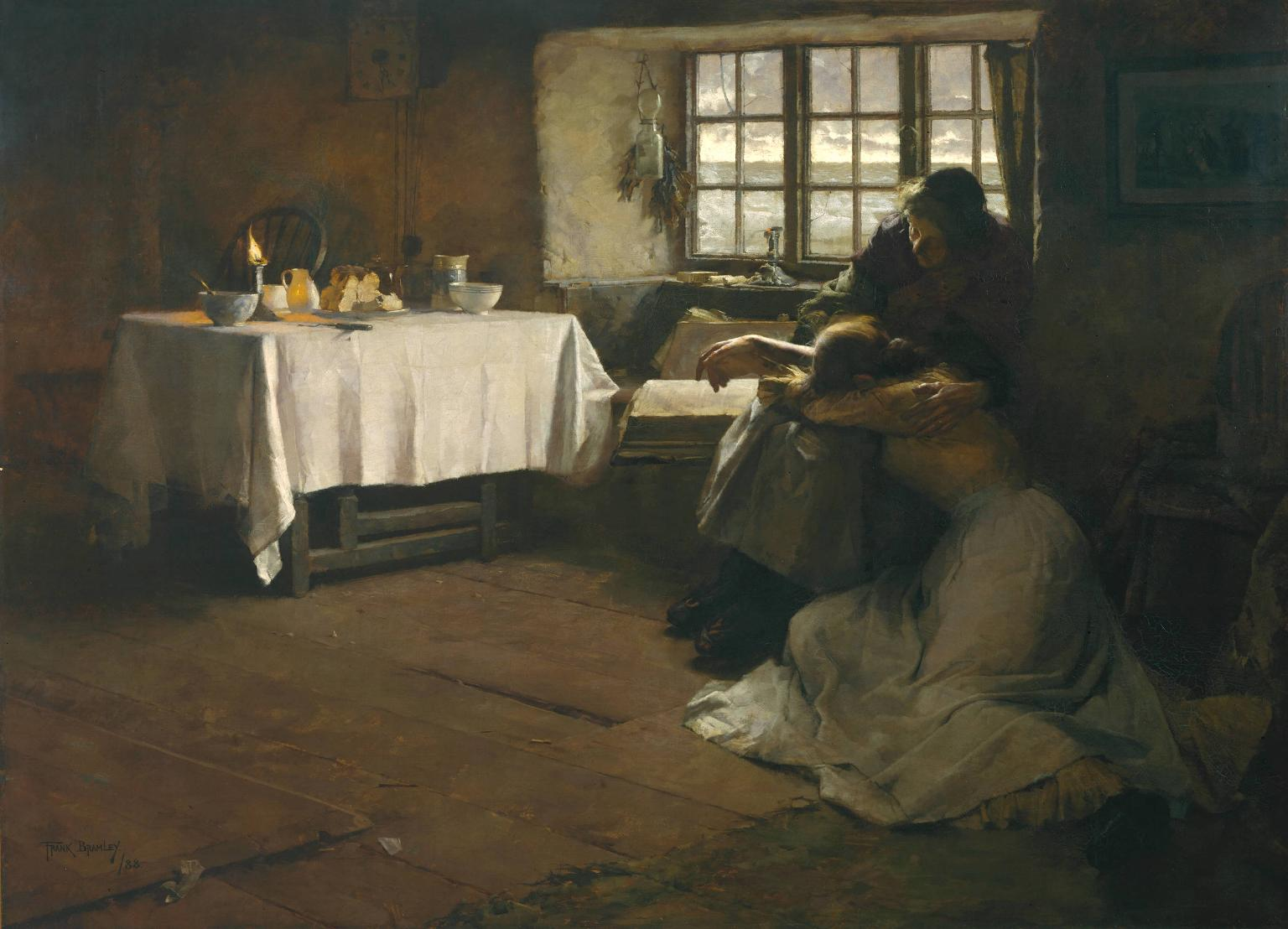
A Hopeless Dawn (1888) by Frank Bramley

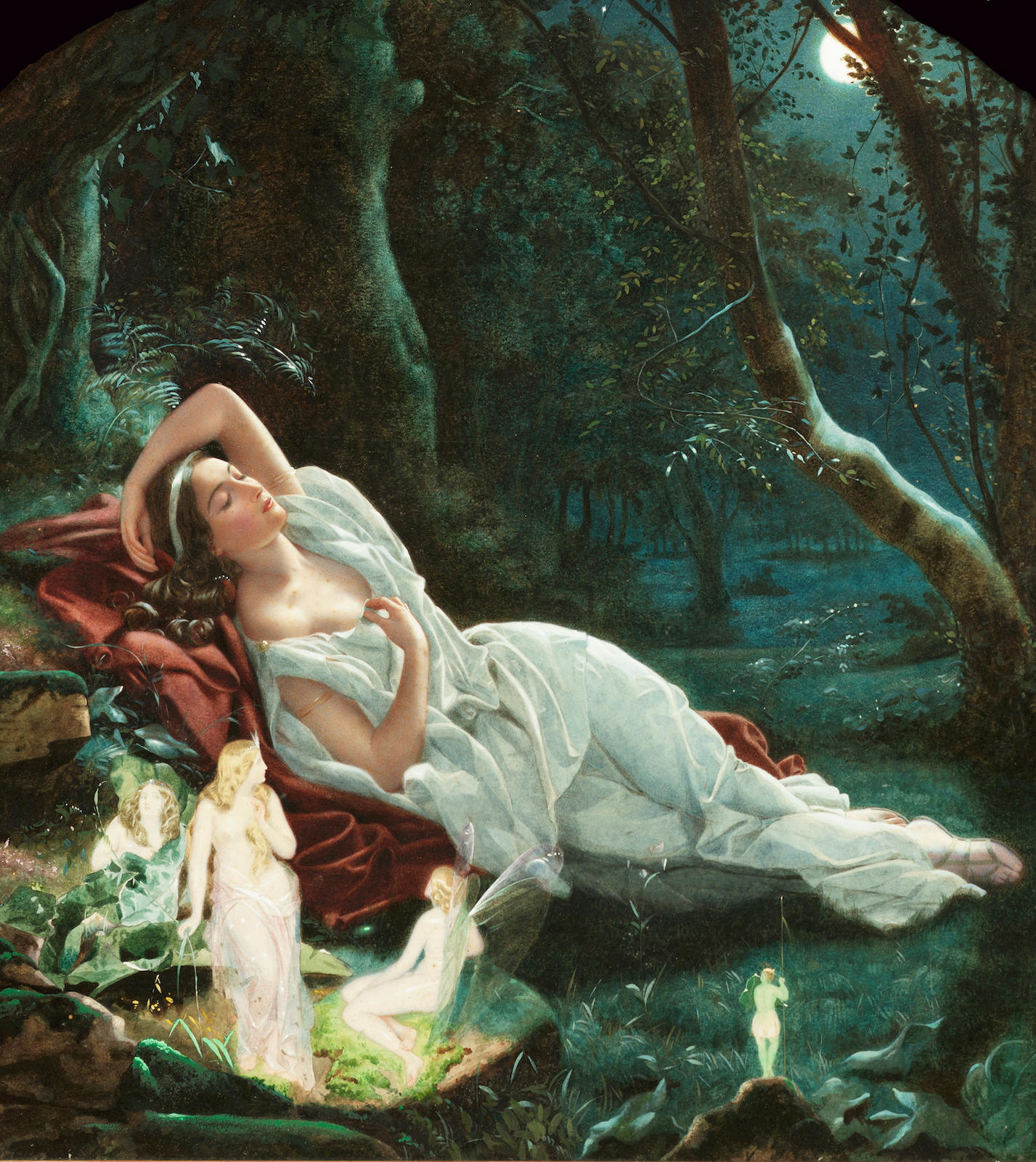
Titania Sleeping in the Moonlight Protected by Her Fairies by John Simmons, inspired by Shakespeare's A Midsummer Night's Dream.

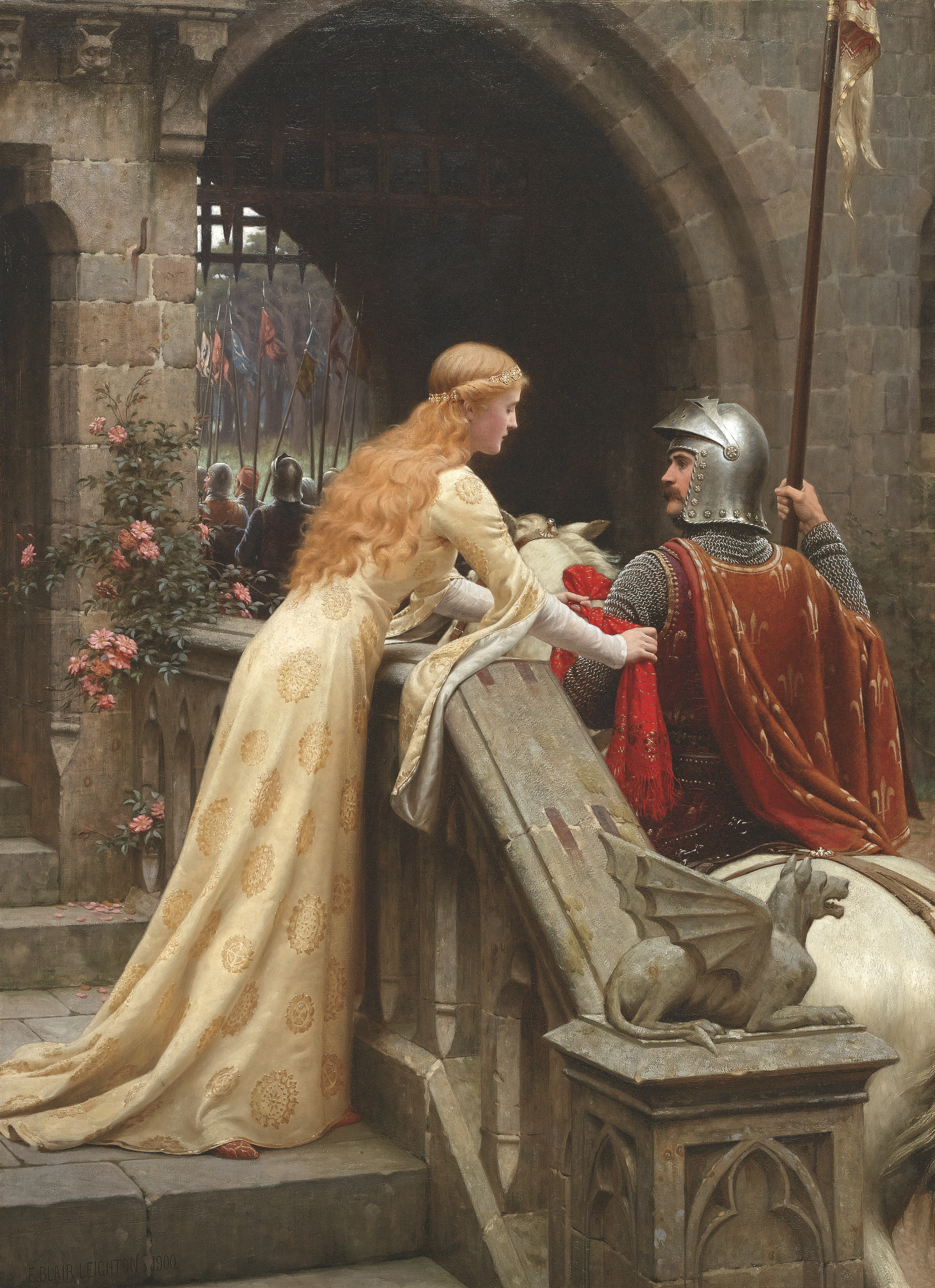
God Speed! (1900) by Edmund Leighton

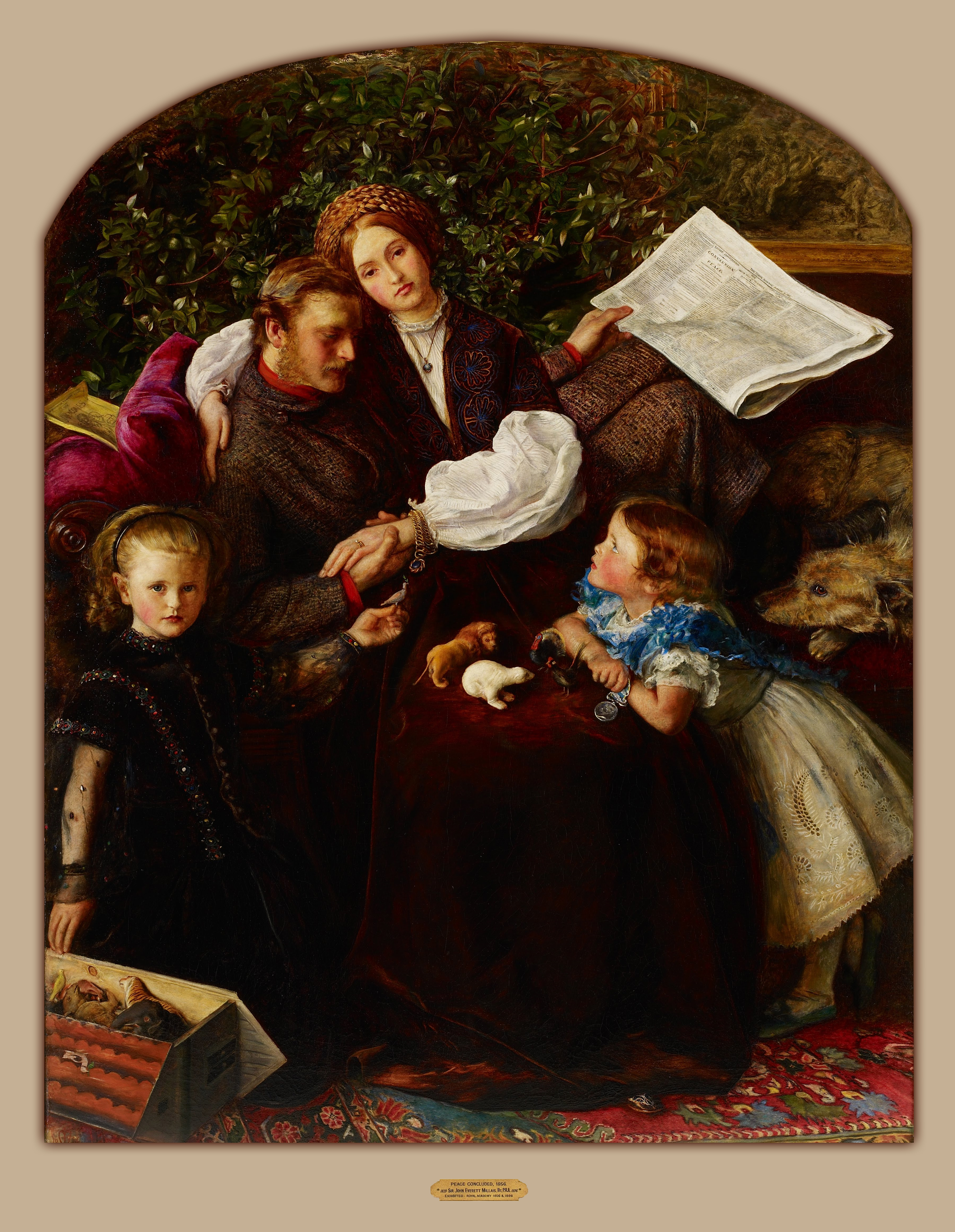
A wounded British officer reading The Times's report of the end of the Crimean War

== Journalism ==
In 1817, Thomas Barnes became general editor of The Times; he was a political radical, a sharp critic of parliamentary hypocrisy and a champion of freedom of the press. Under Barnes and his successor in 1841, John Thadeus Delane, the influence of The Times rose to great heights, especially in politics and in the financial district (the City of London). It spoke of reform. The Times originated the practice of sending war correspondents to cover particular conflicts. W. H. Russell wrote immensely influential dispatches on the Crimean War of 1853–1856; for the first time, the public could read about the reality of warfare. Russell wrote one dispatch that highlighted the surgeons' "inhumane barbarity" and the lack of ambulance care for wounded troops. Shocked and outraged, the public reacted in a backlash that led to major reforms especially in the provision of nursing, led by Florence Nightingale.

The Manchester Guardian was founded in Manchester in 1821 by a group of non-conformist businessmen. Its most famous editor, Charles Prestwich Scott, made the Guardian into a world-famous newspaper in the 1890s.

The Daily Telegraph in 1856 became the first penny newspaper in London. It was funded by advertising revenue based on a large audience.

== Leisure ==
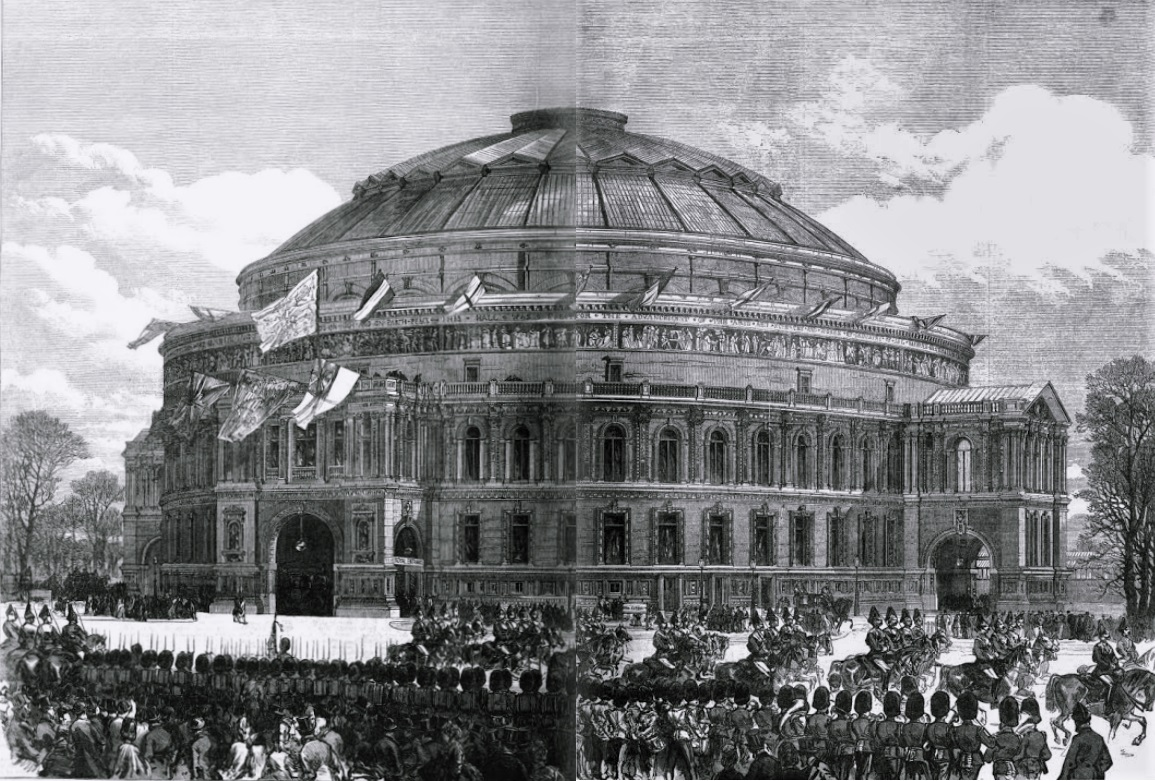
Opening of the Royal Albert Hall in 1871

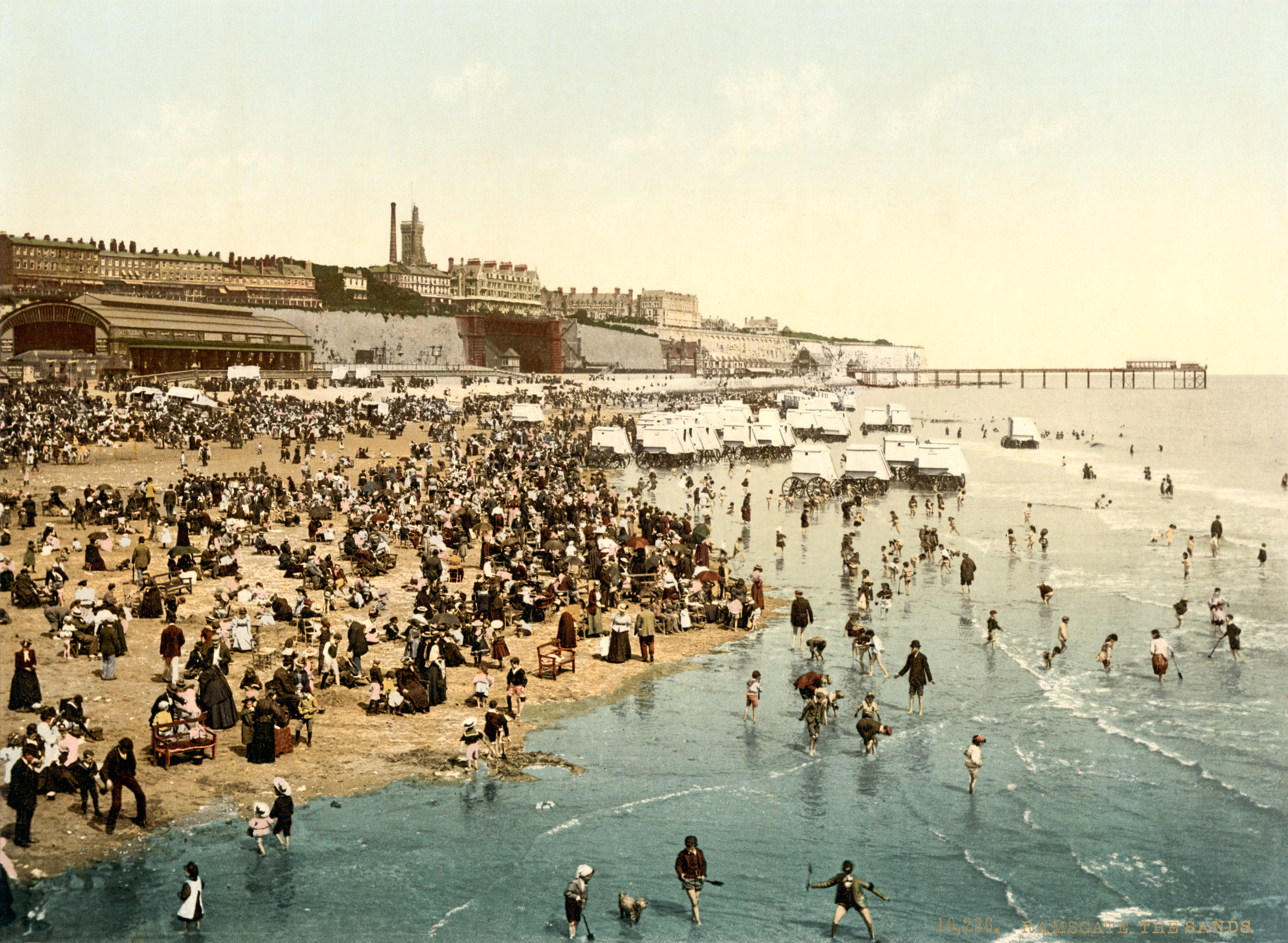
Ramsgate beach in 1899

At mid-century, the idea of a large amphitheatre for musical performances and conferences for the learned captured the imagination of not just Henry Cole, Secretary of the Science and Art Department, but also Prince Albert. By 1857, Cole planned to build one with "due regard to the principles of sound." After the Prince's death in 1861, this project had the additional goal of commemorating him. The Royal Albert Hall opened on 29 March 1871. Lieutenant-Colonel Henry Scott, R.E., who managed the construction, estimated there was enough space for 7,165 people plus 1,200 performers; the theoretical limit was 10,000. As desired by the Prince, it did not rely on public funds but was purely privately funded.

Opportunities for leisure activities increased dramatically as real wages continued to grow and hours of work continued to decline. In urban areas the nine-hour workday became increasingly the norm; the Factory Act 1874 limited the working week to 56.5 hours, encouraging the movement towards an eventual eight-hour workday. Furthermore, a system of routine annual holidays came into play, starting with white-collar workers and moving into the working-class. Some 200 seaside resorts emerged thanks to cheap hotels and inexpensive railway fares, widespread bank holidays and the fading of many religious prohibitions against secular activities on Sundays.

By the late Victorian era the leisure industry had emerged in all cities. It provided scheduled entertainment of suitable length at convenient locales at inexpensive prices. These included sporting events, music halls, and popular theatre. By 1880 football was no longer the preserve of the social elite, as it attracted large working-class audiences. Average attendance was 5000 in 1905, rising to 23,000 in 1913. That amounted to 6 million paying customers with a weekly turnover of £400,000. Sports by 1900 generated some three percent of the total gross national product. Professional sports were the norm, although some new activities reached an upscale amateur audience, such as lawn tennis and golf. Women were now allowed in some sports, such as archery, tennis, badminton and gymnastics.

== See also ==
- 19th-century London
- Demographics of the Victorian era
- Economy, industry, and trade of the Victorian era
- History of public health in the United Kingdom
- Humanitarian movement
- Political and diplomatic history of the Victorian era
- Theatre in the Victorian era
- Victorian burlesque
- Victorian era
- Victorian erotica
- Victorian fashion
- Victorian house
- Victorian jewellery
- Victorian masculinity
- Victorian painting
- Vegetarianism in the Victorian era
- Women in the Victorian era
