= Dorothy Boulger =

British novelist 1846-1923

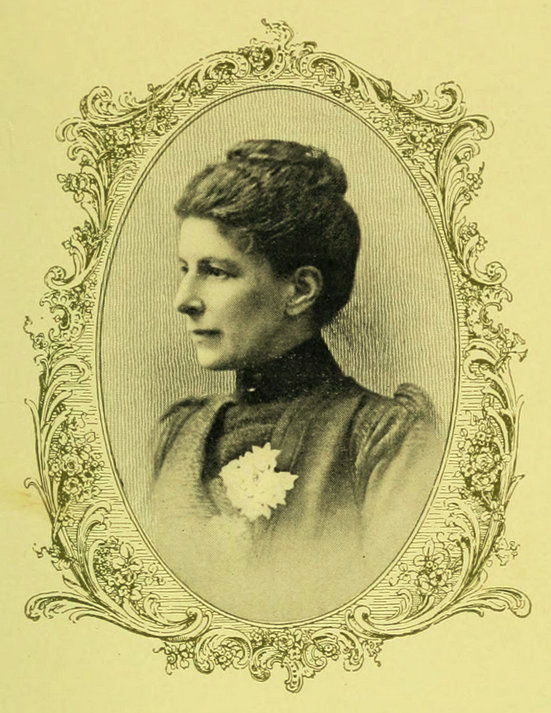
- Born: 30 May 1846; Lambeth, Surrey
- Died: 22 July 1923 (aged 77); South Kensington, London, England
- Occupations: Writer and novelist
- Writing career
- Pen name: Theo Gift
- Subject: includes romances

Signature
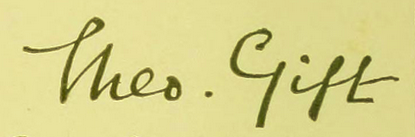

Dorothy Boulger born Dorothy Henrietta Havers and who wrote under the name Theo Gift (30 May 1846 – 22 July 1923) was an English writer and novelist.

== Life ==
Boulger was born in Lambeth, Surrey, on 30 May 1846. She was one of four children born to Thomas Havers (1810–1870) of Thelton Hall, the family seat, at Thelveton in Norfolk and his first wife Ellen Ruding. One of her sisters became the artist Alice Havers, who married the painter Frederick Morgan. Thomas occupied himself in company clerking and administration and in early 1854 accepted a post as a manager of the Falkland Islands Company in the Falkland Islands. He took his wife and children with him, along with a governess, Mary Coppinger, and a nurse.

The three sisters and brother were in the Falkland Islands until 1860. Their mother Ellen, died there in October 1854 about eight months after their arrival and Thomas remarried a year later in October 1855 to the governess, Mary Coppinger. In 1860 Thomas was relieved of his position in the Falklands and found a new post with new employers in Montevideo, relocating his family there. Upon Thomas's death in Montevideo in March 1870, his children by Ellen, now young adults and four younger children by Mary, all returned to England in April and May of the same year.

She began her writing for magazines in 1871, enjoying a two-year run of stories with Cassell's Family Magazine edited by the novelist G. Manville Fenn and a decade with the periodical All the Year Round edited by Charles Dickens Jr. She wrote her first novel, True to her Trust, or, Womanly Past Question which was a romance in 1874.

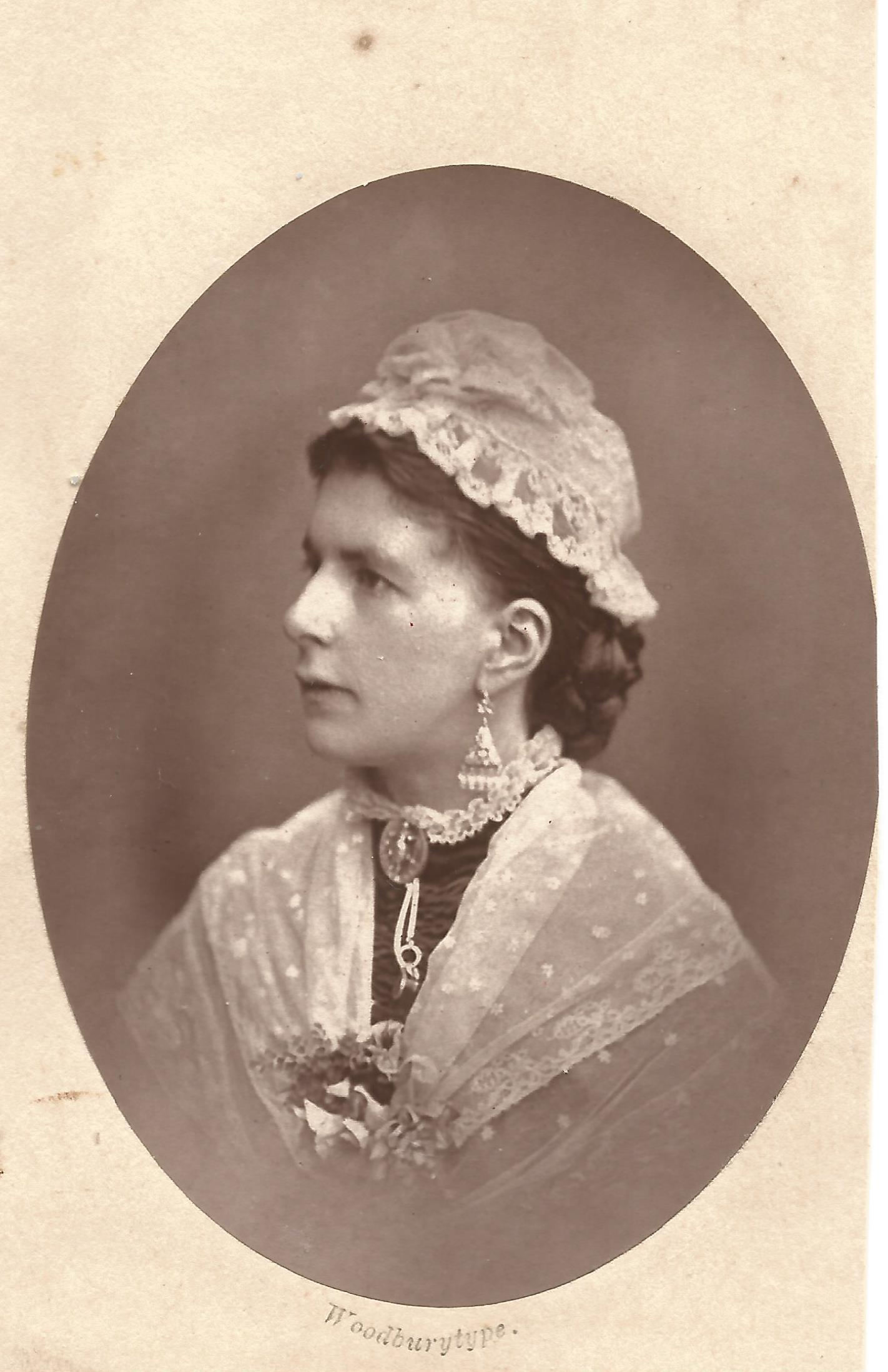
Boulger in 1880

Her sister Alice Havers illustrated some of her stories. She wrote fiction with a heroine at the centre of the plot including her 1885 book "Lil Lorimer" which concerns a girl growing up in South America and it is thought to be based in part on her own life. Another two of her books are interesting because they are set in the Falkland Isles. Her story includes the alcoholism and over-enthusiastic missionaries but again the narrative revolves around heroic women. Her last book was dated 1901.

Boulger died in South Kensington, Middlesex on 22 July 1923.

== Private life ==
She married George Simonds Boulger, a botanist, in 1879.

== Works ==
- True to her Trust (1874)
- Pretty Miss Bellew (1875)
- Maid Ellice (1878)
- A Garden of Girls (1880)
- A Matter-of-Fact Girl (1881)
- Visited on the Children (1881)
- An Innocent Maiden (1883)
- Lil Lorimer (1885)
- Victims (1887)
- Not for the Night-Time (1889)
- Dishonoured (1890)
- The Little Colonists (1890)
- An Island Princess (1893)
- Wrecked at the Outset (1894)
- The Case of a Man with his Wife (1901)
