= Ulmus 'Hertfordensis Latifolia' =

Elm cultivar

- Genus: Ulmus
- Cultivar: 'Hertfordensis Latifolia'
- Origin: England

The elm cultivar Ulmus 'Hertfordensis Latifolia' was listed by Loudon in Arboretum et Fruticetum Britannicum (1838) as "the broad-leaved Hertfordshire Elm", and later mentioned, as Ulmus campestris hertfordensis latifolia, by Boulger in the Gardener's Chronicle (II. 12: 1879), but without description. It was considered "probably U. carpinifolia" (:U. minor) by Green, though broad leaves point to a possible Ulmus × hollandica hybrid identity. Hybrids of this type were once common in eastern Hertfordshire.

== Description ==
Loudon's "broad-leaved" epithet distinguished the tree from his narrow-leaved Hertfordshire elm, U. 'Hertfordensis Angustifolia'.

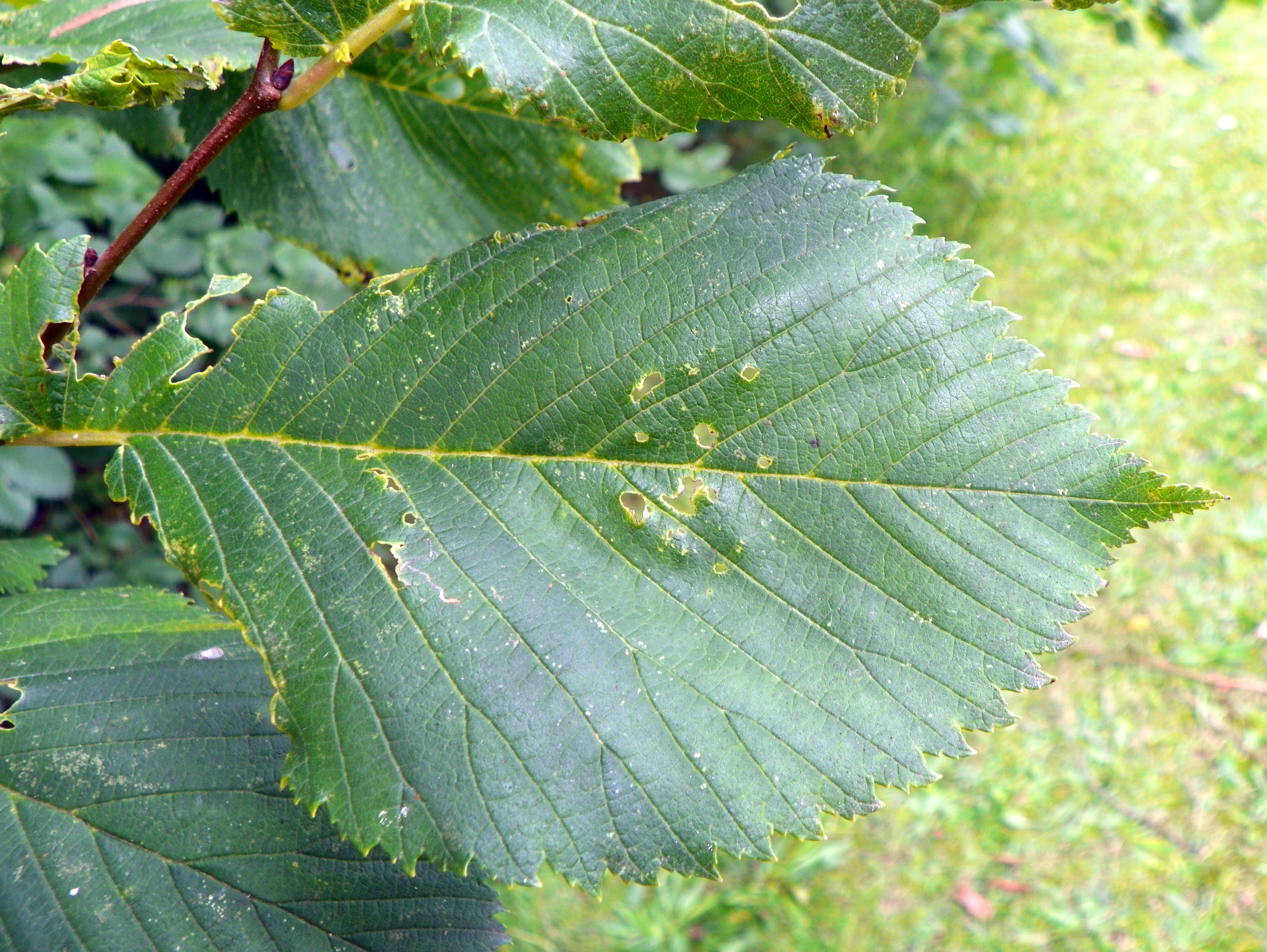
Leaf of unidentified broad-leaved elm (likely hybrid), Six Hills Common, Stevenage, Hertfordshire

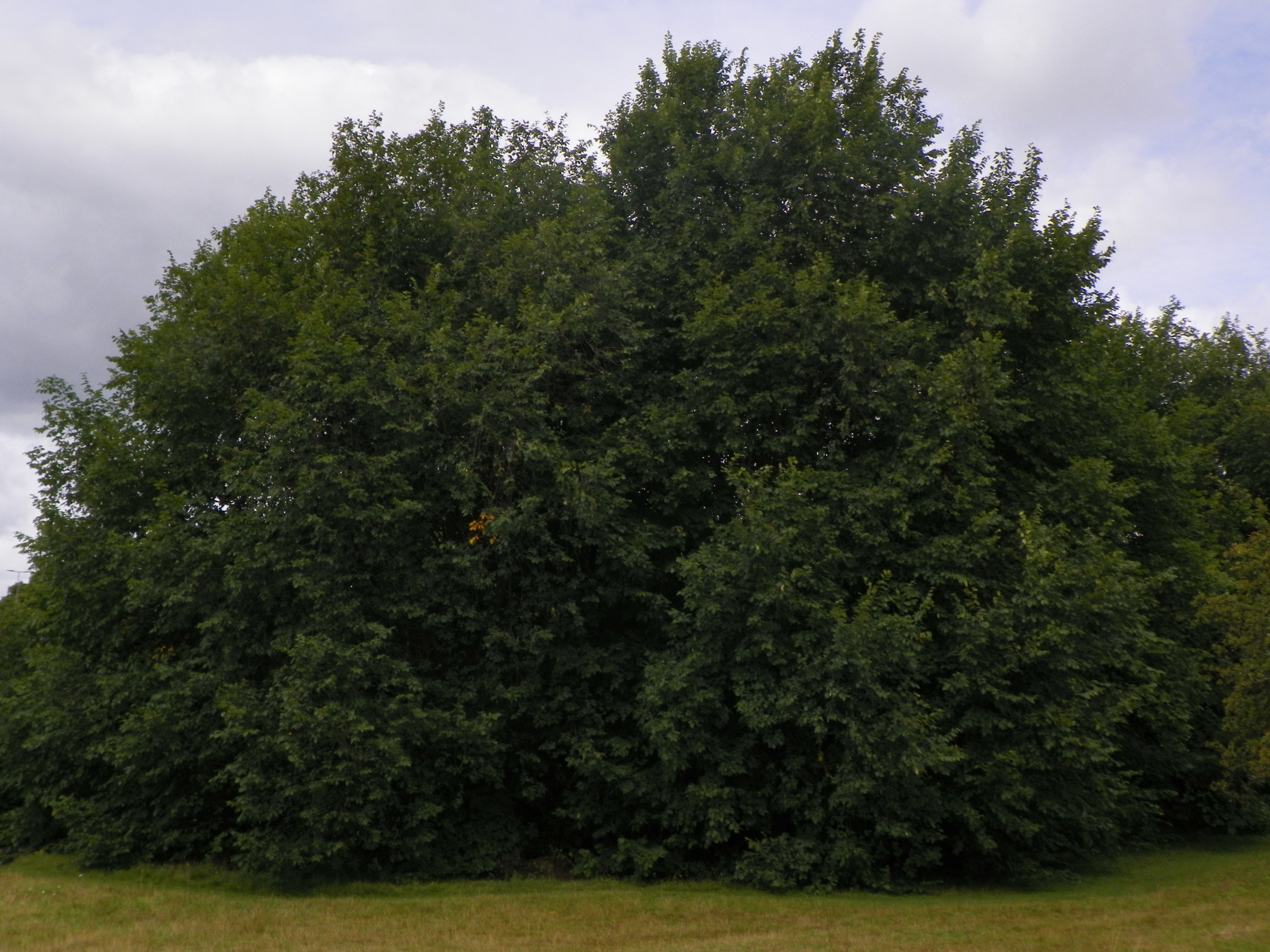
Unidentified broad-leaved elms, Six Hills Common, Stevenage, Hertfordshire

== Pests and diseases ==
Though susceptible to Dutch Elm Disease, field elms (see Green's conjecture above) and their hybrids produce suckers and usually survive in this form in their area of origin.

== Cultivation ==
The Woodland Trust records a small number of mature U. minor and Ulmus × hollandica surviving in Hertfordshire.

== Synonymy ==
- Ulmus campestris hertfordensis latifolia: Boulger, in Gardener's Chronicle II. 12: 298 1879.
