= Ulmus 'Hertfordensis Angustifolia' =

Elm cultivar

- Genus: Ulmus
- Cultivar: 'Hertfordensis Angustifolia'
- Origin: England

The elm cultivar Ulmus 'Hertfordensis Angustifolia' was listed by Loudon in Arboretum et Fruticetum Britannicum (1838) as "the narrow-leaved Hertfordshire Elm", and later mentioned, as Ulmus campestris hertfordensis angustifolia, by Boulger in the Gardener's Chronicle (II. 12: 1879), but without description. It was considered "probably U. carpinifolia" (:U. minor) by Green.

== Description ==
Loudon's "narrow-leaved" epithet distinguished the tree from his broad-leaved Hertfordshire elm, U. 'Hertfordensis Latifolia'.

== Pests and diseases ==
Though susceptible to Dutch Elm Disease, field elms (see Green's conjecture above) produce abundant suckers and usually survive in this form in their area of origin.

== Cultivation ==
The Woodland Trust records a small number of mature U. minor surviving in Hertfordshire.

== Synonymy ==
- Ulmus campestris hertfordensis angustifolia: Boulger, in Gardener's Chronicle II. 12: 298, 1879
