= Thomas Havers =

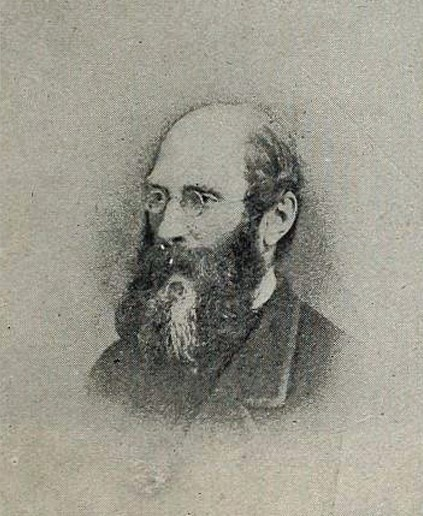
- Born: Thomas Havers; 1810; Thelveton, UK
- Died: 1870 (aged 59–60); Montevideo
- Education: Stonyhurst College
- Occupation: Architect
- Practice: Falkland Islands Company
- Buildings: Mercado Central de Montevideo,

Thomas Havers (1810–1870) was a British businessman and architect, active in the Falkland Islands and Uruguay in the middle of the 19th century. He is noted for designing the Mercado Central de Montevideo (Montevideo Central Market). He was the father of writer and novelist Dorothy Boulger and painter and illustrator Alice Havers.

== Early life ==
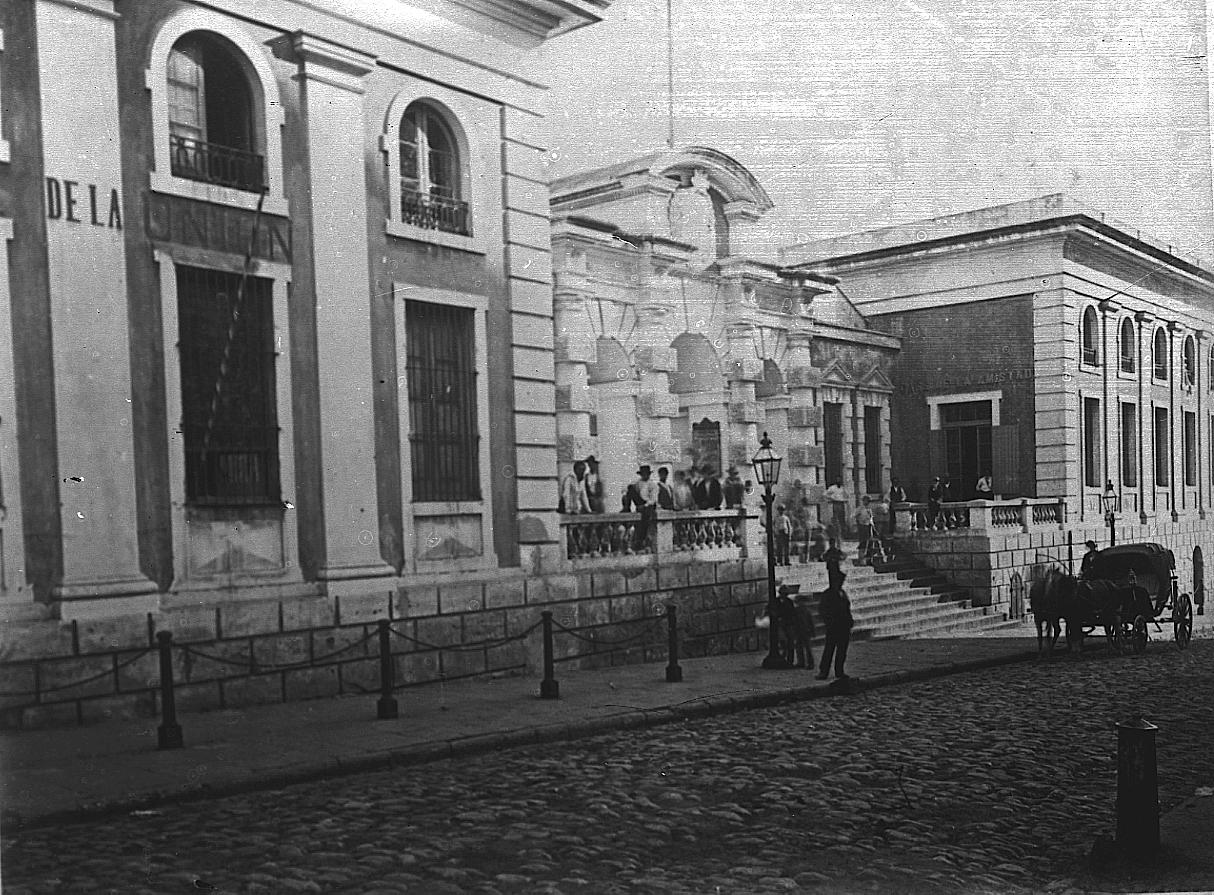
Mercado Central de Montevideo, 1904

Thomas Havers was born in Thelton Hall, Norfolk in 1810, and raised a Catholic. He was educated at the Jesuit school Stonyhurst College, Lancashire. He married Ellen Ruding in 1844. He worked for the London firm Ricketts, Boutcher & Co, rising to the position of 'confidential clerk' to William Boutcher, one of the first directors of the Falkland Islands Company. By 1851, Havers was acting secretary of the FIC and three years later was appointed colonial manager.

== Emigration to the Falkland Islands ==
Havers travelled to the Falkland Islands in 1854 with his wife, four children and two servants. He spent some time in Montevideo on the journey down, in the house of Samuel Fisher Lafone. Ellen his wife died within four months of arriving on the Falklands. He later went on to marry his governess, Mary Clare Coppinger. In June 1854 Thomas was appointed a Justice of the Peace, and in August 1854 he was appointed deputy chairman of the Magistrates and Police Courts of the Falkland Islands. Havers was committed to his Catholic faith and organised prayer services, catechism classes, and made efforts to obtain the services of an English speaking resident priest. In 1858, his position in the Falkland Islands Company was terminated, citing "culpable disregard of the Board's instructions and from his having kept his accounts in such negligent confusion". This left him destitute, and with no means of returning to England.

== Uruguay ==
In February or March 1861 Havers and his family sailed to Montevideo, settling in the Union neighbourhood. There, he established connections with the British Consulate, founded The Montevideo Times, a short lived English language publication which appeared from 1864 to 1865, and later was named Director of Public Works by General Flores. In this role, he managed the design and construction of a building to house the office of Mail, Museum and Public Library Correos, Museo y Biblioteca Pública, located in Sarandí street, and opened in 1867. He later oversaw the construction of the Mercado Central de Montevideo (Montevideo Central Market). Borrowing from Mannerist traditions, the building occupied a two-acre site which opened 1 April 1869, at a cost of £80,000. It mainly sold agricultural and seafood products. Shortly after its inauguration, a storm resulted in significant water ingress to the structure, and the failure of its plumbing, gutters and sewer system. On arrival to assess the damage, Havers was met by an angry mob which pelted him with fruit and vegetables, until he was rescued by the local police.

== Personal life ==
Havers was married twice, to Ellen Ruding in 1844 and later Mary Clare Coppinger in 1855. He had 8 children, including the writer and novelist Dorothy Boulger and painter and illustrator Alice Havers. He died in March 1870 in Montevideo, and was buried in The British Cemetery in Montevideo. Upon Thomas' death, his children by Ellen, now young adults and four younger children by Mary, all returned to England in April and May of the same year.
