= Alice Havers =

English painter

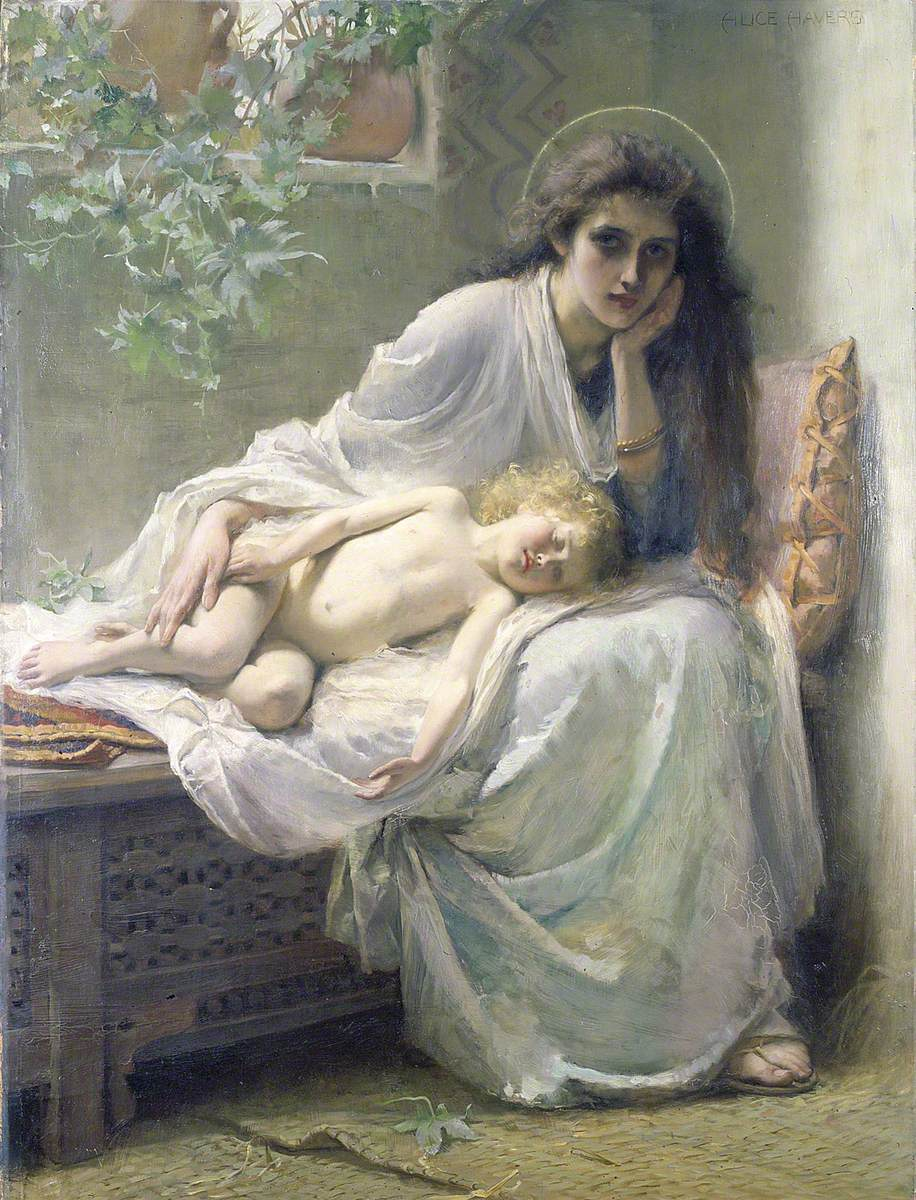
But Mary kept all these things and pondered them in her heart (1888)

Alice Mary Celestine Havers, (Note: Her name before marriage and professionally.) married name Alice Mary Morgan (1850 – 26 August 1890, London), was an English painter and illustrator.

== Life ==
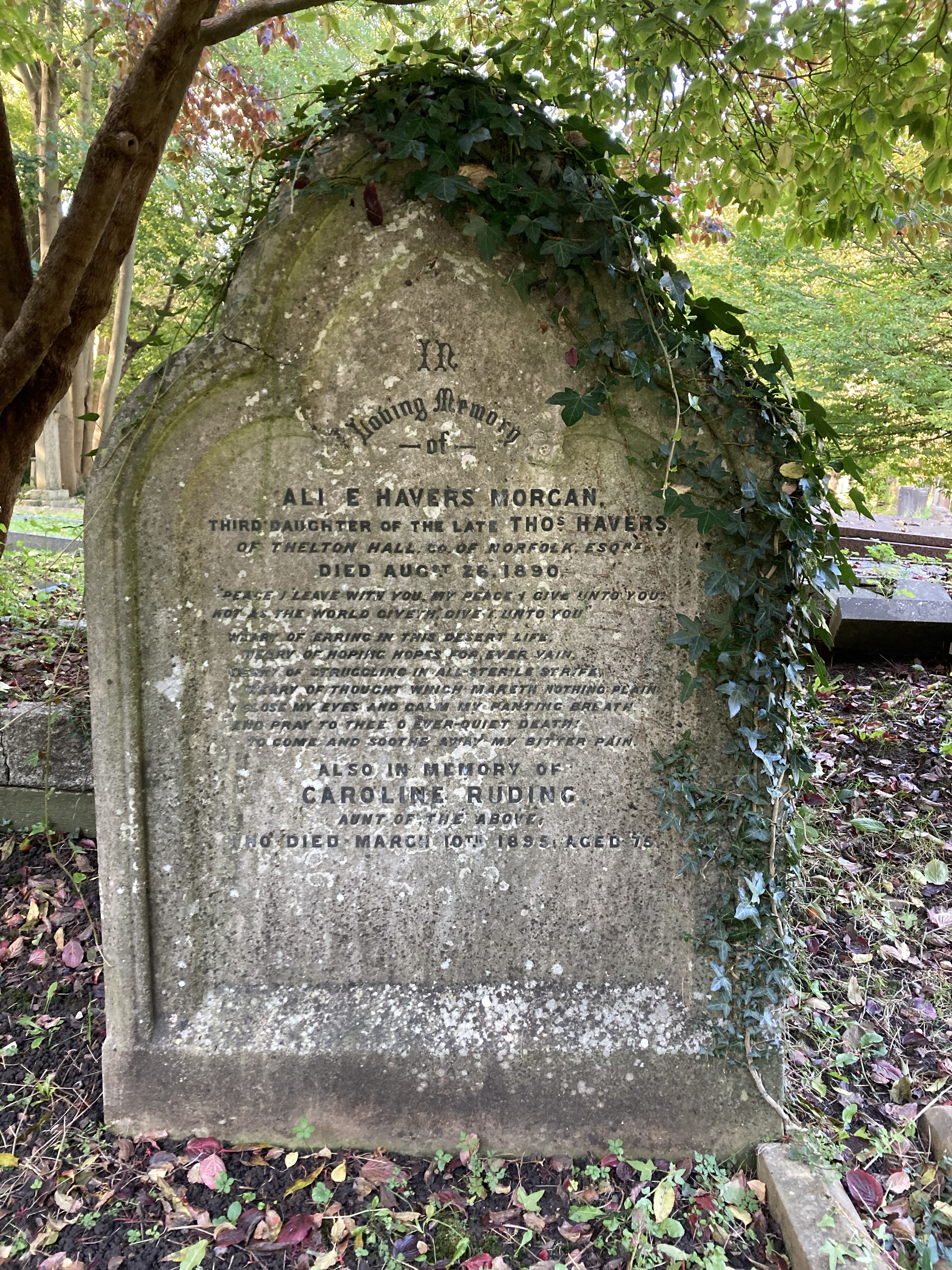
Grave of Alice Havers in Highgate Cemetery

Alice Mary Havers was the third daughter and youngest of four children born 19 May 1850 to Thomas Havers (1810–1870) of Thelton Hall, Thelveton, Norfolk, the family seat, and his first wife Ellen Ruding (1817–1854). One of her sisters became the writer Dorothy Boulger. Thomas occupied himself in the commercial world of company clerking and administration and in early 1854 accepted a post as a manager of the Falkland Islands Company in the Falkland Islands. He took his wife and children with him along with a governess, Mary Coppinger and a nurse.

Alice, her two sisters and brother were in the Falkland Islands until 1860. Their mother Ellen, died there in October 1854 about eight months after their arrival and Thomas remarried a year later in October 1855 to the governess, Mary Coppinger. In 1860 Thomas was relieved of his position in the Falklands and found a new post with new employers in Montevideo, Uruguay, relocating his family there. Upon Thomas' death in Montevideo in March 1870, his children by Ellen, now young adults and four younger children by Mary, all returned to England in April and May of the same year.

Alice and entered the School of Art at South Kensington (now the Royal College of Art), where she gained a free studentship in the first year.

In 1888 Havers moved to Paris with her three children by her husband, the fellow artist Frederick Morgan (1847–1927), drawn by the French school of painting. Having married Morgan in 1872, she was to petition for divorce in 1889, made final in July 1890. Her career was cut short by her sudden death at the age of 40 at her residence in Marlborough Road, St. John's Wood, London, on 26 August 1890. She was buried on the eastern side of Highgate Cemetery.

== Works ==
Havers first exhibited at the Society of British Artists in Suffolk Street, and in 1873 for the first time at the Royal Academy. She also exhibited watercolours at the Dudley Gallery, London. One of her early pictures, Ought and carry one, was purchased by Queen Victoria, and was engraved; and she attained success and popularity. She also worked in art illustration, in particular for some of the stories written by her sister Dorothy Henrietta Boulger who used the pseudonym "Theo Gift". She was commissioned for special programmes for Savoy Operas.

In 1889 Havers exhibited at the Paris Salon two pictures, one of which (already exhibited at the Royal Academy in 1888), And Mary kept all these sayings in her heart, attracted attention and was honourably commended.

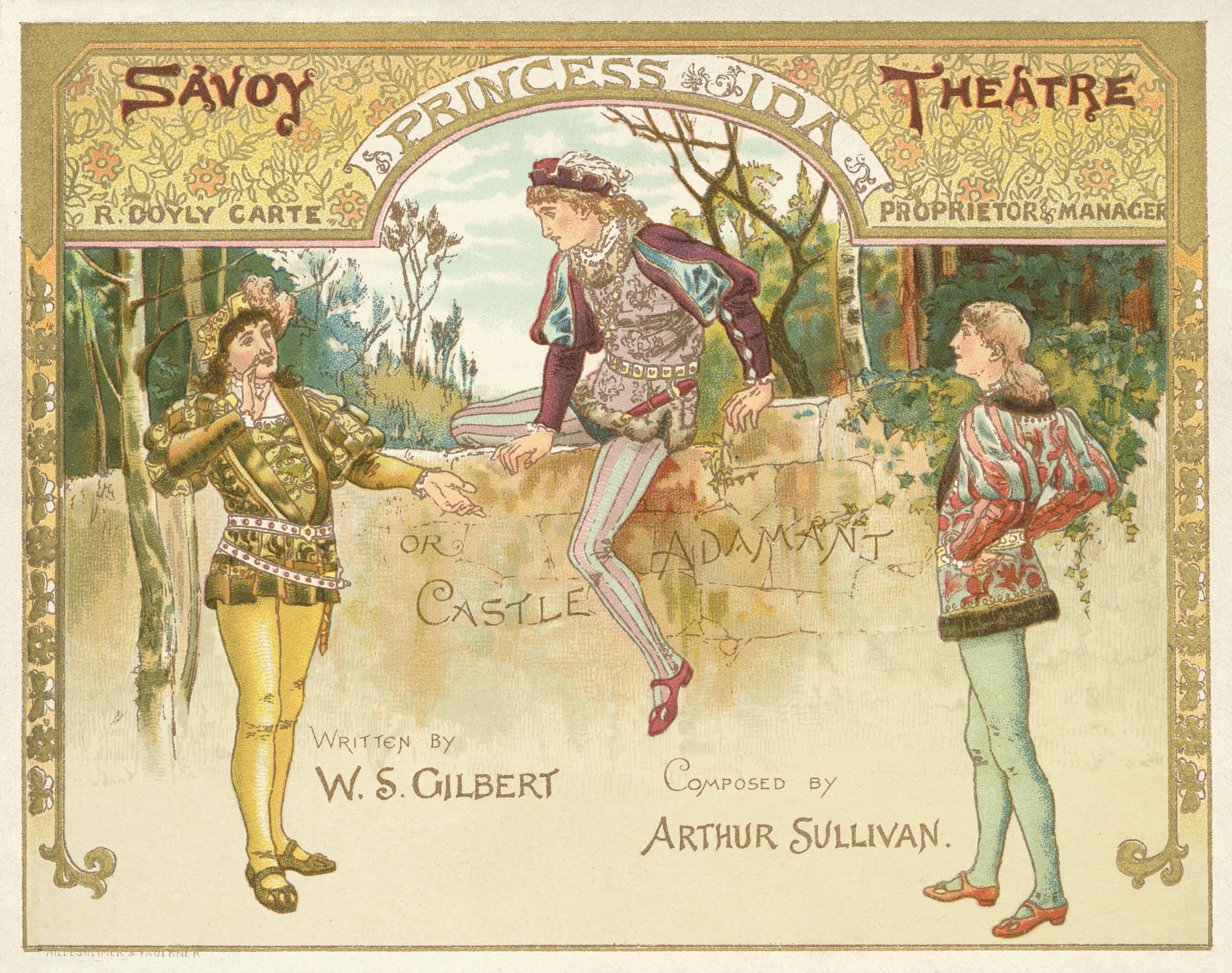
Programme for Gilbert and Sullivan's Princess Ida illustrated by Havers

== Family ==
In April 1872 Havers married Frederick Morgan the artist, but she continued to be known professionally under her maiden name. She left two sons and one daughter.
