= John Morgan (artist) =

English painter (1822–1885)

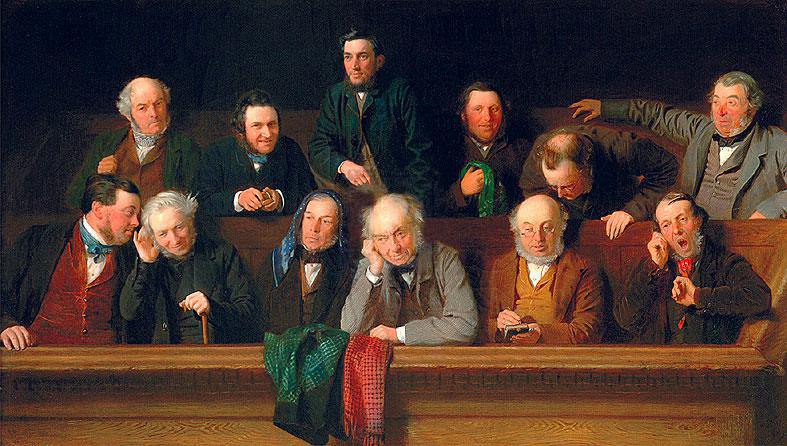
The Jury (1861) by John Morgan

John Morgan (1822–1885) was a British genre artist.

== Life ==
Born in Pentonville, north London, Morgan studied at the School of Design, London and also trained in Paris under Thomas Couture (1815–1879). Whilst living in Aylesbury in 1861, he found fame with his paintings The Jury and The Country Auction.

== Career ==
A member of the Society of British Artists (SBA), his work was influenced by Thomas Webster and William Powell Frith. His son Frederick Morgan was an equally popular artist, most noted for His Turn Next, famously used by the Pears Soap advertising campaign. He died in Hastings.
