= Arthur Elsley =

English painter

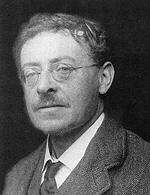
- Born: 20 November 1860; London
- Died: 19 February 1952 (aged 91); Tunbridge Wells

Arthur John Elsley (1860–1952) was an English painter of the late Victorian and Edwardian periods, famous for his idyllic genre scenes of playful children and their pets. He achieved great popularity during his life and much of his work appeared in calendars, magazines and books.

== Life ==
Elsley was born in London, one of six children of John Elsley, coachman and amateur artist, and Emily Freer. Elsley's father had exhibited at the British Institution Exhibition in 1845 but later in life contracted tuberculosis which forced him into early retirement.

When only eleven years old, Arthur was turning out proficient animal studies made during frequent visits to the London Zoo in Regent's Park. At age fourteen, he enrolled in the South Kensington School of Art (later the Royal College of Art). At about this time his eyesight became permanently damaged by a bout of measles.

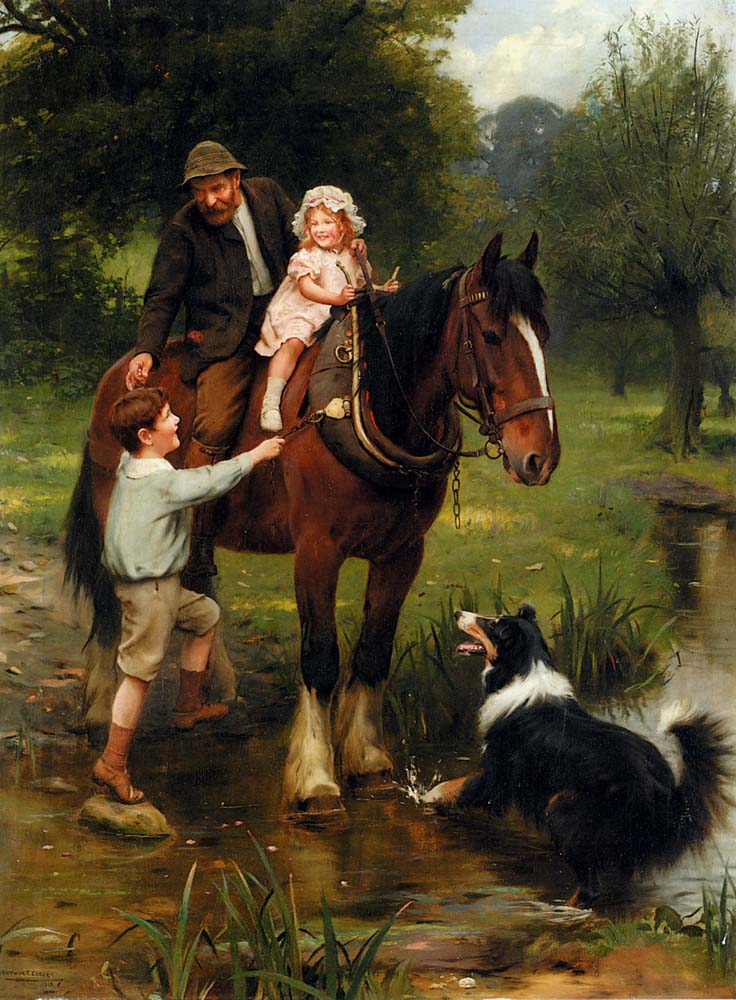
A Helping Hand

Elsley took up the post of probationer at the Royal Academy Schools in 1876. here he was influenced by Frederick Pickersgill (Keeper of the Royal Academy), Edward Armitage (Professor of Painting), John Marshal (Professor of Anatomy), and Henry Bowler (Professor of Perspective).

A large number of his paintings were inspired by sketches made on frequent cycling trips around the countryside. In 1878 he exhibited his first picture, entitled "A Portrait of an Old Pony" at the Royal Academy. He remained with the Academy Schools until 1882 and then began accepting commissions to do portraits of children and dogs, with an emphasis on horses. Many of his portrait commissions came from the Benett-Stanford family of politicians living at Preston Manor in Brighton—some works are still exhibited there. His first known published work was a line engraving entitled "April Floods In Eastern Counties" printed in "Young England" magazine in 1885.

Elsley was friendly with the English painters Solomon Joseph Solomon and George Grenville Manton (1855-1932), sharing a studio with the latter in 1876. Through Manton Elsley met Frederick Morgan, a popular painter of children. In 1889 Elsley moved into Morgan’s studio, an arrangement that led to a good working relationship - Morgan having difficulties with painting animals, an area in which Elsley excelled.

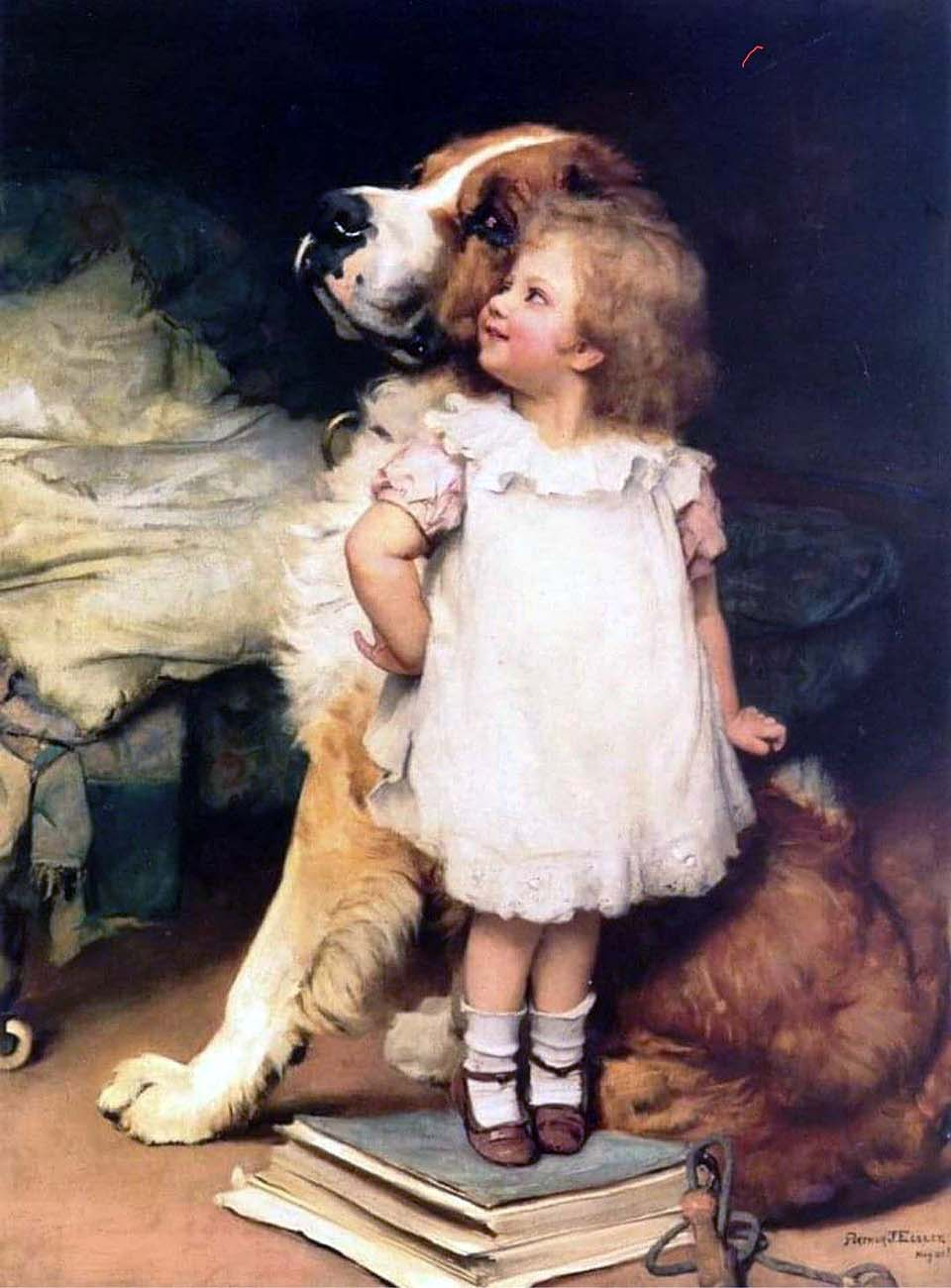
I'se Biggest

Elsley was awarded a silver medal in the Crystal Palace exhibition of 1891 for his painting "The Bailiff’s Daughter of Islington". In 1892 his painting "I'se Biggest" was published, and later had to be re-engraved to satisfy public demand. The painting was of a young girl comparing her height with that of a large St. Bernard dog. The Illustrated London News printed one of Elsley’s paintings, Grandfather’s Pet as their Christmas choice for 1893.

On 11 November 1893 Elsley married Emily "Emm" Fusedale, his second cousin who had modeled for him for ten years. They had one child, Marjorie, born in 1903, and who posed for many of his subsequent paintings. After his marriage Elsley set up his own studio, but continued his painting relationship with Frederick Morgan. After the death of Charles Burton Barber (1845–1894), Elsley became his natural successor as the foremost painter of children and their pets.

Relations between Elsley and Frederick Morgan were permanently soured when Morgan accused Elsley of using his ideas. After this Elsley became bolder in his compositions, often depicting scenes with multiple figures, all from individual sitters visiting his studio. Hardly ever leaving his studio, the outdoors components of his paintings were from sketches he had made earlier and magazine images. It was thought that these indoor painting methods aggravated his already faulty vision.

The First World War severely reduced Elsley's output of paintings - he produced only 4 paintings from 1915 to 1917, one of which, a portrait of his daughter Marjorie, was exhibited at the Royal Academy. He contributed to the war effort by working on bomb-sights in a munitions factory, straining his already poor eyesight. By the early 1930s he was able only to carry out woodworking and gardening.

Arthur John Elsley died at home in Tunbridge Wells on 19 February 1952.

== Work ==
At the height of his career from 1878 to 1927, Elsley exhibited 52 works at the Royal Academy. However, many more were shown at exhibition halls throughout the country: The Royal Society of British Artists, Royal Institute of Oil Painters, French Gallery, Dudley Gallery and Crystal Palace in London; The Walker Art Gallery, Liverpool; The Institute of Fine Art, Glasgow; Manchester City Art Gallery; The Royal Society of Artists, Birmingham; Nottingham Castle Museum; Victoria Art Gallery, Bath; The International Exhibition in Cork Ireland (1902–03).

His prints were used commercially by many firms such as calendars by Thomas D. Murphy Co., Sunlight Soap, Brook's Sewing Cottons, Peek Freans biscuits & cakes; and Bibby’s Quarterly (an illustrated journal of country and home life). His paintings were also used in advertising materials distributed by A&F Pears, for instance as prints in the Pear's Annual (published each year at Christmas).

Currently Elsley's work can be seen at the Russell-Cotes Art Gallery & Museum in Bournemouth, in the collections of "Hartlepool Museums and Heritage Service", at Lady Lever Art Gallery in Port Sunlight, Liverpool, Royal Liverpool Children’s Hospital in Liverpool and the "Royal Pavilion Art Gallery and Museum", Preston Manor, 194 Preston Road, Brighton.

== Notable works ==
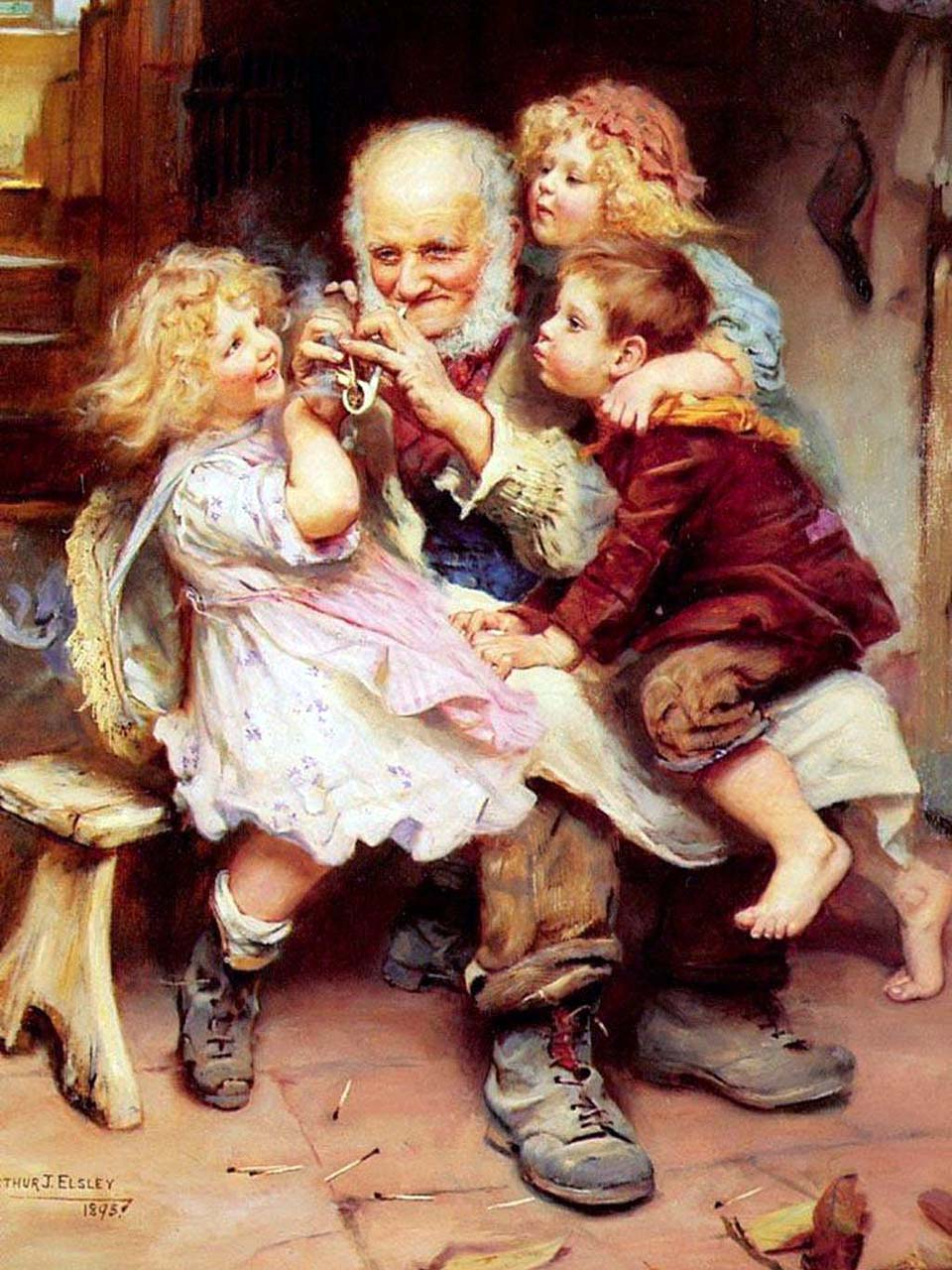
Grandfather's Pet

- 'The Bailiff's Daughter of Islington', 1891 - won a silver medal in the Crystal Palace exhibition.
- 'I'se Biggest', 1892 - reproduced as a popular print, selling so widely that it needed to be re-engraved
- 'Grandfather's Pet', 1892 - chosen by The Illustrated London News as their Christmas print for 1893
- 'The Invaders' - distributed as a print for Pear's Annual in 1915
