= Charles Burton Barber =

British painter (1845–1894)

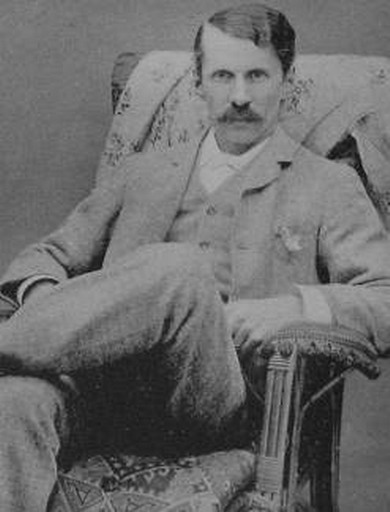
- Charles Burton Barber, 1880
- Born: 1845; Great Yarmouth, Norfolk, England
- Died: 1894 (aged 48–49); London, England
- Education: Royal Academy
- Known for: Portraits of children and animals
- Notable work: Queen Victoria with John Brown; Off To School; Suspense
- Style: Realism
- Elected: Royal Institute of Oil Painters, 1883

Charles Burton Barber (1845–1894) was a British painter who attained great success with his paintings of children and their pets.

Barber was born in Great Yarmouth in Norfolk, and studied from the age of 18 at the Royal Academy, London - receiving a silver medal for drawing in 1864, and first exhibiting there in 1866.

During his lifetime Barber was regarded as one of Britain's finest animal painters and received commissions from Queen Victoria to do paintings of her with grandchildren and dogs, and also the Prince of Wales (later Edward VII) and his pets. A number of his portraits are in the Royal Collection. He exhibited at the Royal Academy from 1866 to 1893. In 1883 he was elected a member of the Royal Institute of Oil Painters.

Barber became a very popular sporting and animal painter, specialising particularly in sentimental portraits of dogs, often with children. His work ranged from photographically realistic to quick sketches. Although some have regarded his work as overly sentimental, his work remains popular, largely because of his competent painting.

Barber received his final commission in 1894 to paint Queen Victoria, with her grandchildren, in her pony-carriage. He died in London soon afterwards. His place as foremost painter of children and pets was taken by Arthur Elsley.

Many of Barber's paintings were made into prints, usually in the medium of photogravure. He exhibited at the Royal Institute of Oil Painters, Walker Art Gallery and Manchester Art Gallery. Much of his art is at the Lady Lever Art Gallery in Port Sunlight.

== Gallery ==
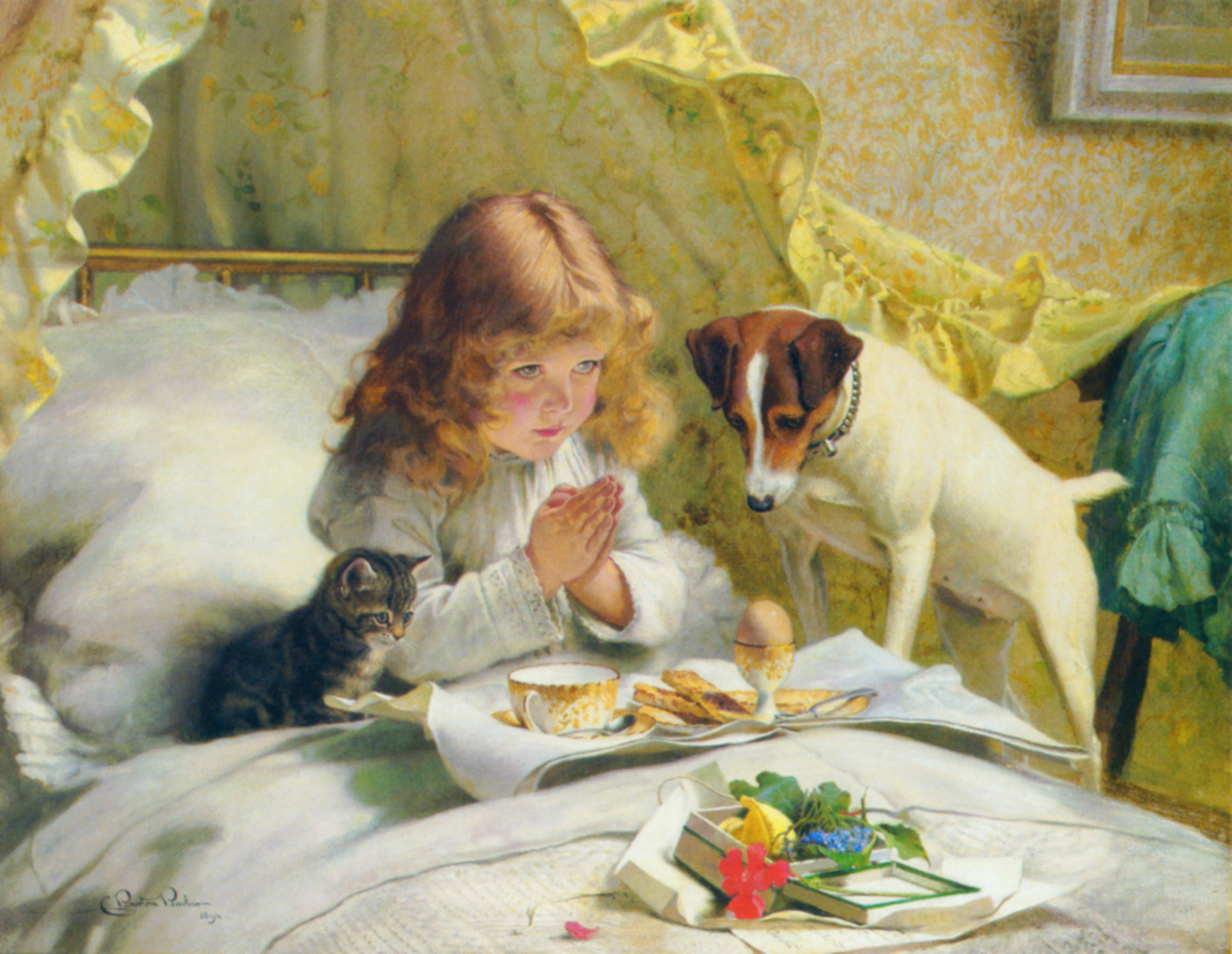
Suspense, 1894

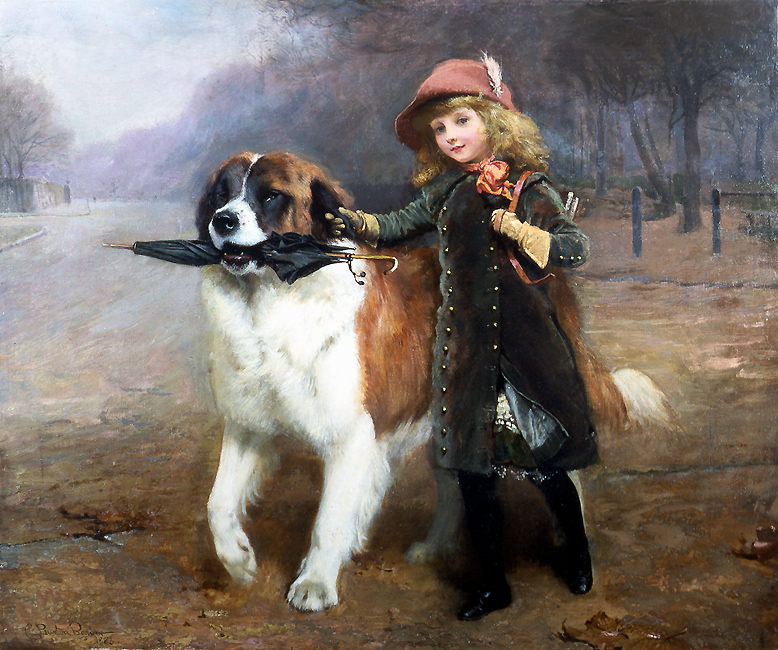
Off to School, 1883

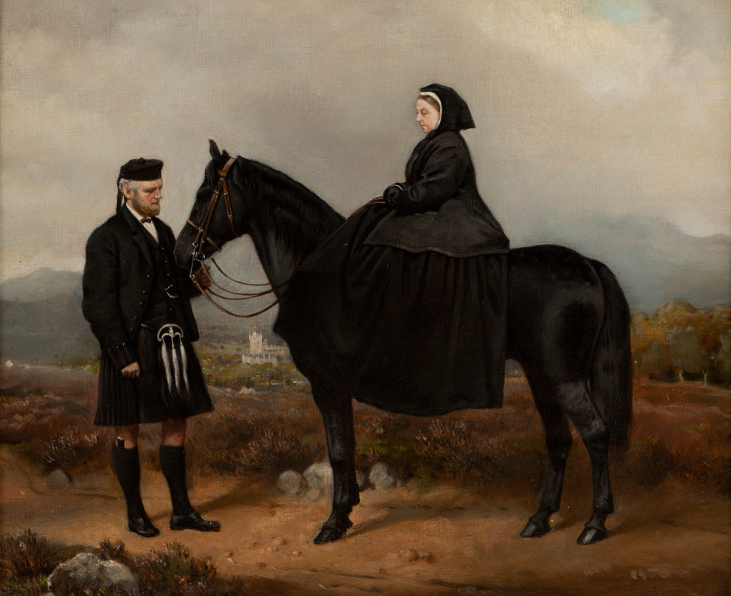
Queen Victoria with John Brown, 1894

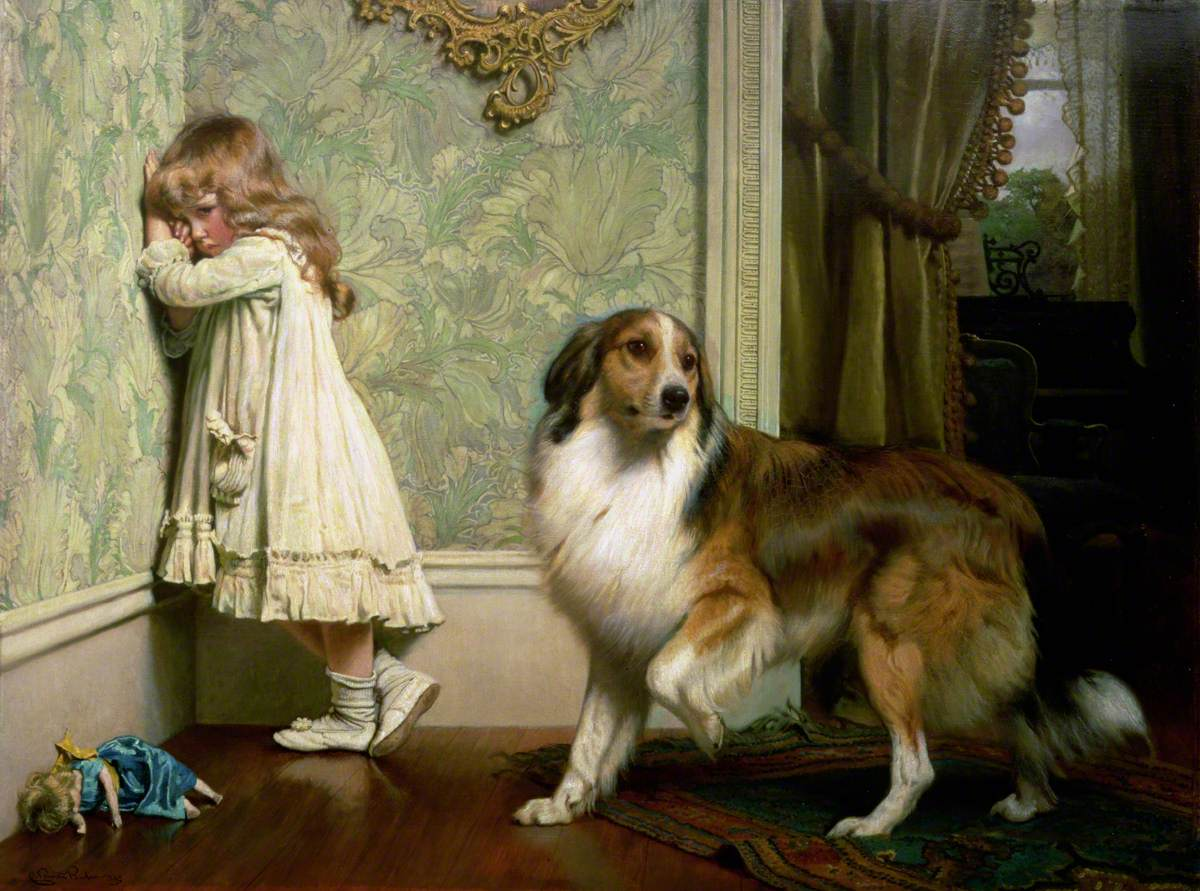
A Special Pleader, 1893
