= Frederick Morgan (painter) =

English painter

Frederick Morgan ROI
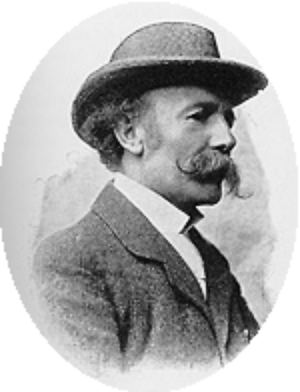
- Born: 1847; London, England
- Died: 3 April 1927 (aged 79–80)
- Known for: paintings of portraits, animals, domestic and country scenes
- Spouse(s): (1) Alice Mary Havers (until her death); two further spouses
- Children: 3; 2 further children from second marriage

Frederick Morgan ROI (1847 – 3 April 1927) was an English painter of portraits, animals, domestic and country scenes. He became known for his idyllic genre scenes of childhood.

== Biography ==
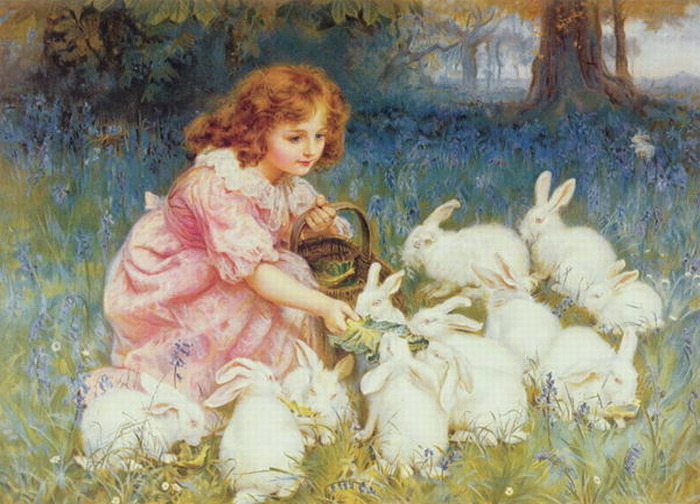
Feeding the Rabbits, also known as Alice in Wonderland

Morgan was born in London to John Morgan and his wife, Henrietta Hester Clare. His father was a successful genre artist sometimes known as 'Jury Morgan' (after one of his paintings The Gentlemen of the Jury). At the age of 14, he was taken out of school by his father who then tutored him in art. At the age of 16, while still studying with his father, his first picture, The Rehearsal, was exhibited at the Royal Academy, and, after a hiatus of several years, his paintings were shown there regularly. For a while he worked as a portrait artist for an Aylesbury photographer; this training proved to be crucial as it "taught him how to observe closely and to give the greatest attention to detail."

Eventually he turned to other subjects for his art, in particular idyllic genre scenes of country life and childhood. For many years, starting in 1874, Thomas Agnew & Sons' purchased all the work he produced. Over this period he painted some of his most popular works such as The Doll’s Tea Party (1874), Emigrants' Departure (1875) and School Belles (1877). Most of his painting was done in the village of Shere close to Guildford, a well-known retreat for artists. He also painted in Normandy, including Midday Rest (1879) and An Apple Gathering (1880).

Although an excellent portrait artist, Morgan had problems in depicting pets and barnyard animals - he enlisted the aid of either Arthur John Elsley or Allen Sealey (1850–1927) when such problems needed resolving.

He is known mostly for his romantic and sentimental paintings of children in the same style as his contemporary Arthur John Elsley. His paintings achieved great popularity in his lifetime and were widely published. He exhibited with the Royal Academy and was a member of the Royal Institute of Oil Painters (ROI).

In 1872, he married another painter, Alice Mary Havers (1850–1890); they had three children. Their eldest son, Valentine, known as Val Havers (1873-1912), also became an artist and from 1898 exhibited almost annually at the Royal Academy until her premature death aged thirty-nine. Frederick Morgan married twice more, producing two children from the second marriage.

Morgan's paintings are exhibited at many art galleries and museums including the Walker Art Gallery in Liverpool and the Russell-Cotes Museum in Bournemouth. His Turn Next was used to advertise Pears' Soap and is in the Lady Lever Art Gallery, Port Sunlight.

== Gallery ==
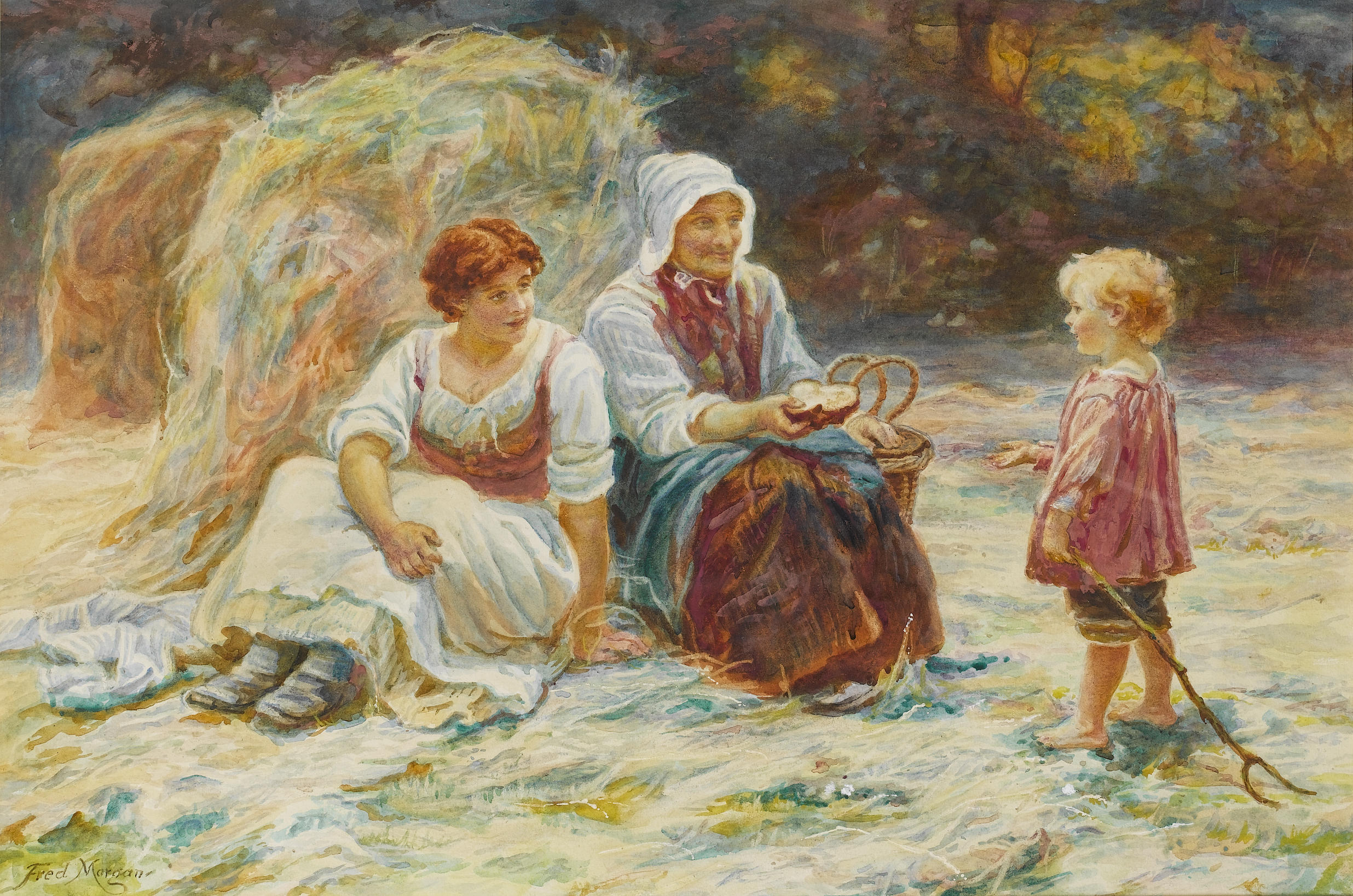
Midday Rest

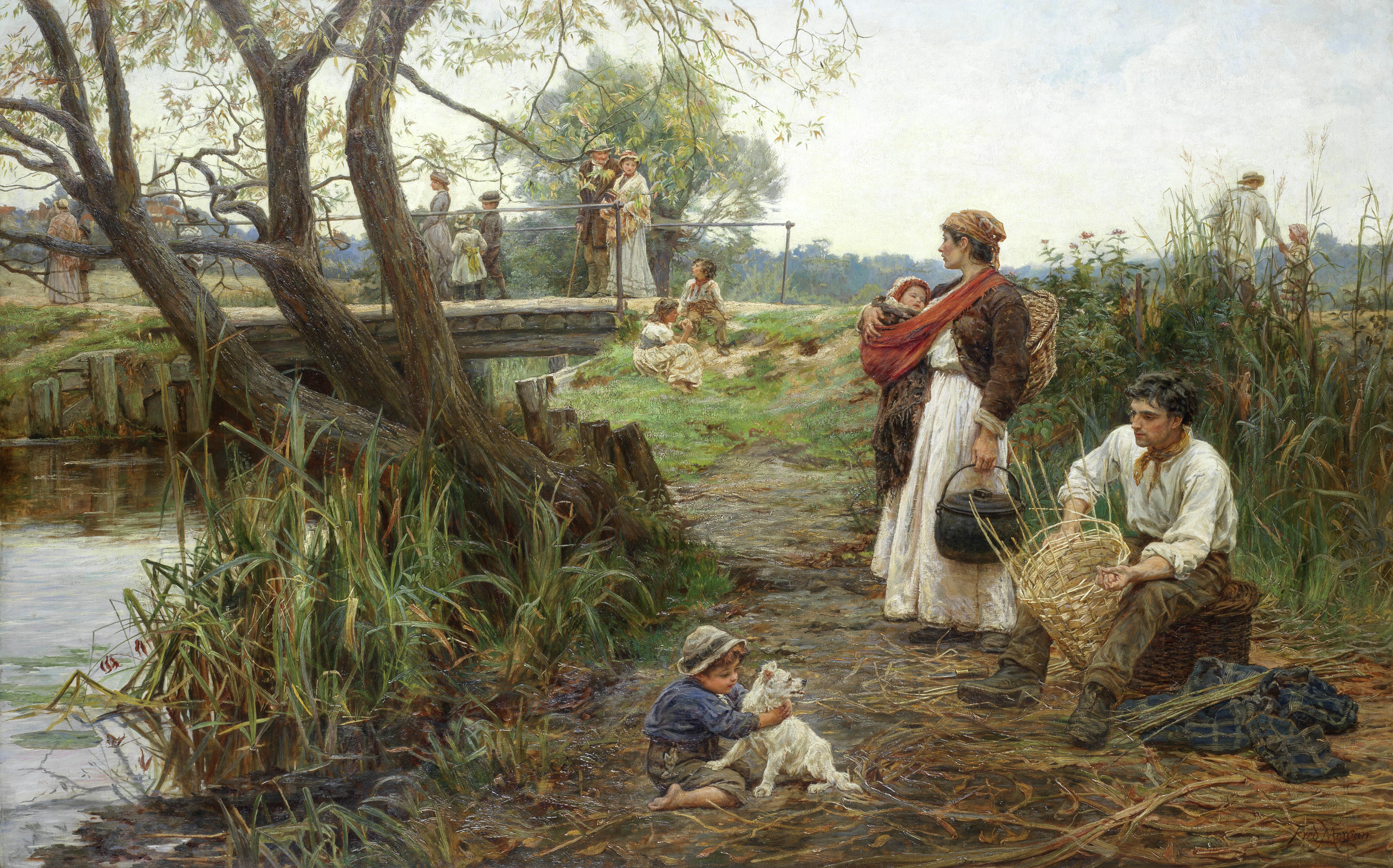
Not of the Fold

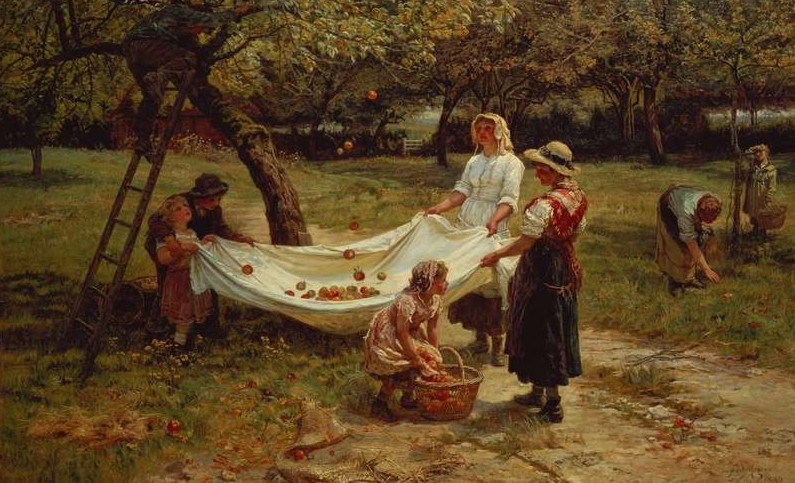
The Apple Gatherers

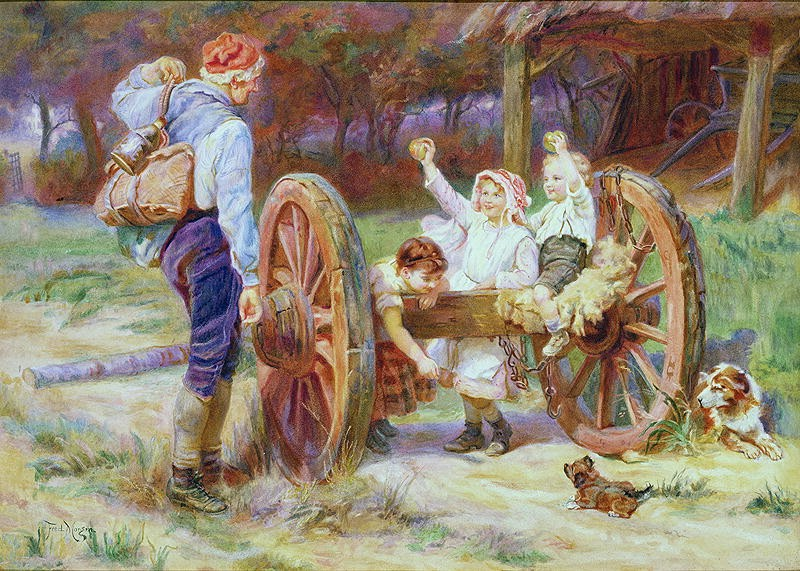
Happy as the Days are Long

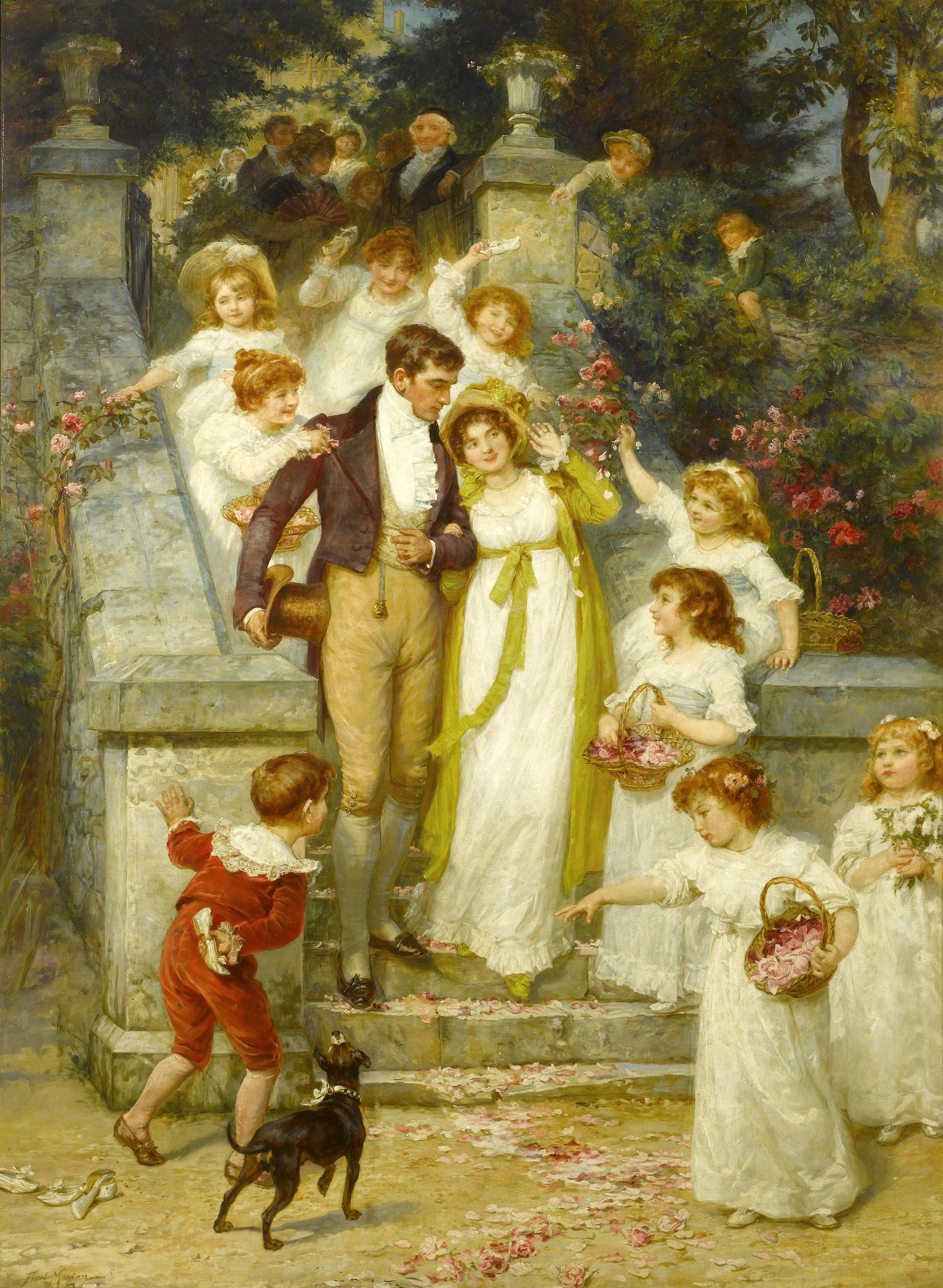
Off for the Honeymoon

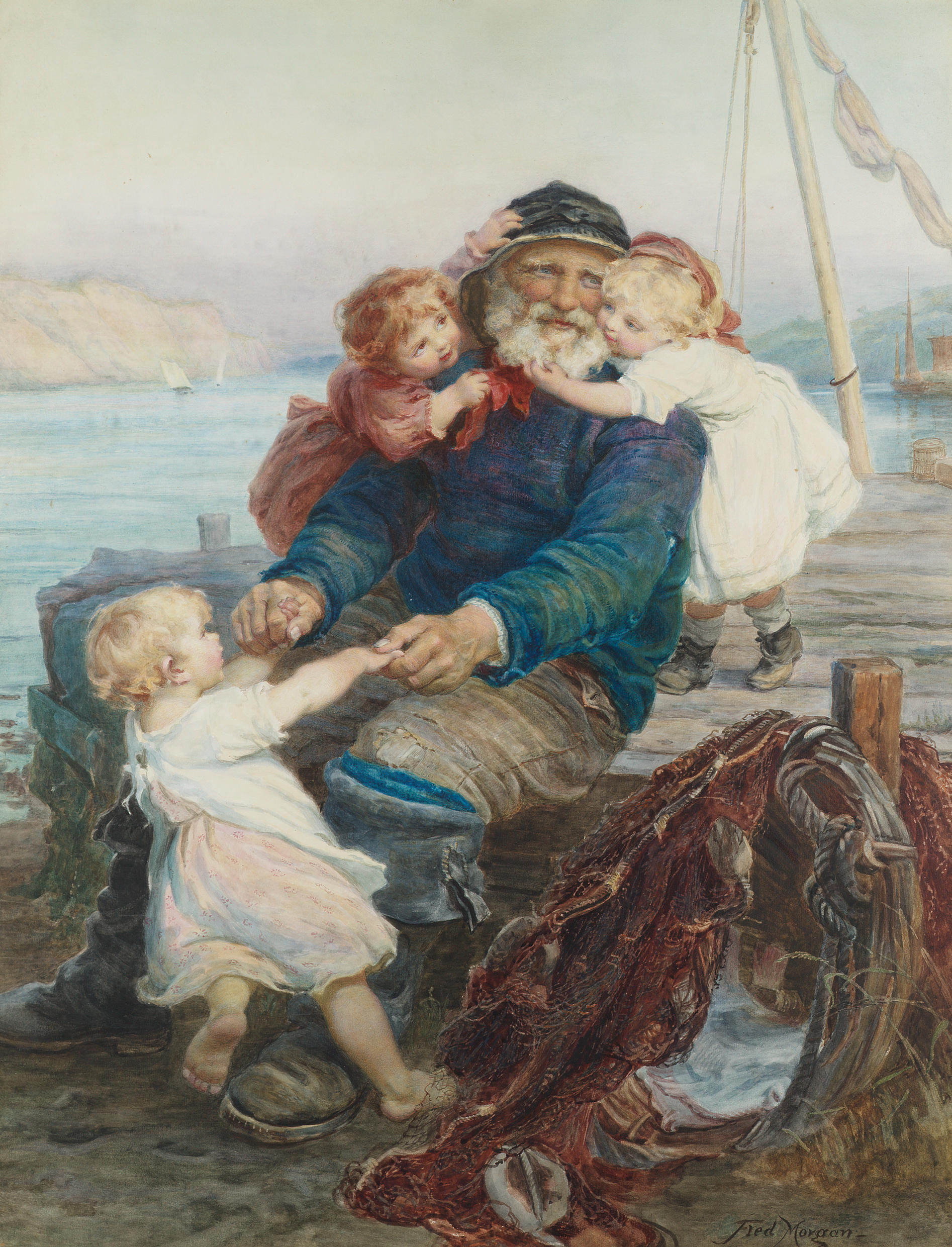
Which do you love best

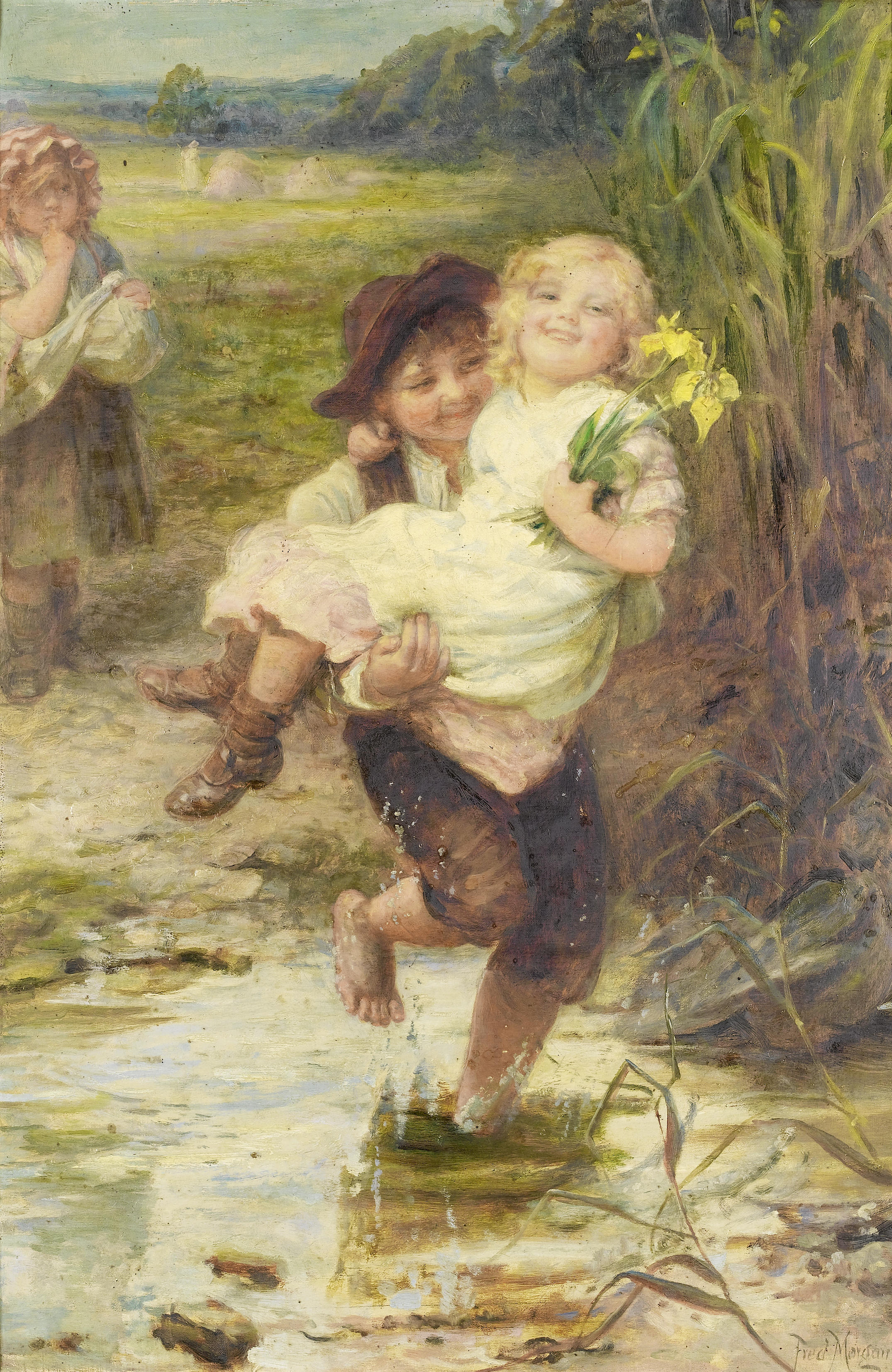
The young gallant

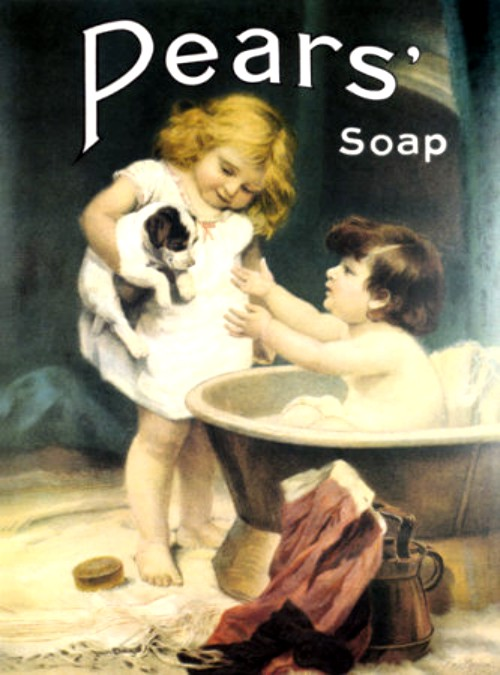
His turn next

== Bibliography ==
- Oldcastle, John. "The Art of Mr. Fred Morgan" (The Windsor Magazine, June 1905, pg. 18)
