= George Simonds Boulger =

English botanist (1853–1922)

George Simonds Boulger FLS FGS FRHS (1853–1922) was an English botanist. Boulger wrote articles as the Kew Gardens Correspondent of The Times, and other works on botany and natural history.

== Life ==
George Boulger was born at Bletchingly, Surrey, the son of Edward Boulger MD. He was a cousin of the sculptor, George Blackall Simonds. He was educated at Wellington College and Epsom College and the Middle Temple. At the age of 23 he became Professor of Natural History at the Royal Agricultural College, Cirencester, and after holding the chair for 30 years he was appointed Honorary Professor.

He had also been Lecturer on Botany and Geology at the City of London College, since 1884, and at the Imperial Institute since 1917. Professor Boulger was an active member of public associations for natural history and botany, the Selborne Society, the Essex Field Club, the South-Eastern Union of Scientific Societies.

He died in Richmond, Surrey on 4 May 1922.

== Works ==
Boulger's works were published in many editions, these were: The Uses of Plants (1889), Familiar Trees, Biographical Index of British and Irish Botanists (with James Britten), The Country Month by Month: (with Jean Allan Owen), Elementary Geology, Flowers of the Field, Flowers of the Wood, Botany, Plant Geography, British Flowering Plants (with Mrs. Henry Perrin), and Wood (1902).

The Uses of Plants talks about commercial uses of plants in fields such as food production and medicine,

Wood discusses about the characteristics and many uses of wood, describing and illustrating various classification and durability of many different types of timber。

== Family ==
Boulger married Dorothy Havers in 1879, the daughter of Thomas Havers, of Thelton Hall, Norfolk. She wrote over fifteen novels and several novellas between 1874 and 1903 under the pen name "Theo. Gift," including some stories for girls.
