= Thelveton =

Village in Norfolk, England

Coordinates: 52.387508°N 1.178921°E

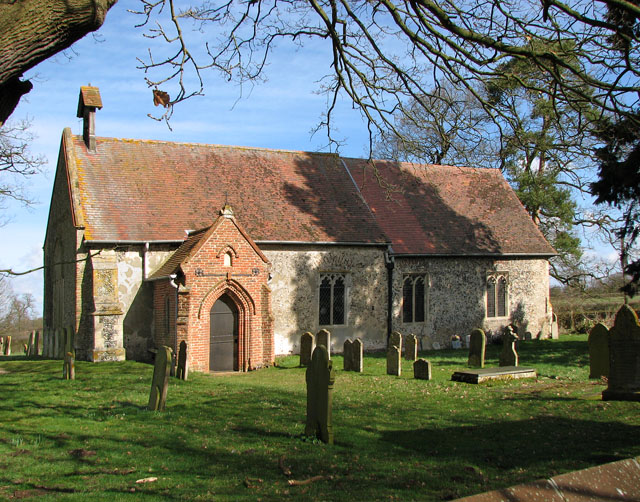
- St Andrew's Church

- Location within Norfolk
- OS grid reference: TM164813
- Civil parish: Scole
- District: South Norfolk
- Shire county: Norfolk
- Region: East
- Country: England
- Sovereign state: United Kingdom
- Post town: DISS
- Postcode district: IP21
- Dialling code: 01379
- Police: Norfolk
- Fire: Norfolk
- Ambulance: East of England

Thelveton (historically Thelton, earlier Telvetun) is a village and former civil parish, now in the parish of Scole, in the South Norfolk district, in the county of Norfolk, England. In 1931 the parish had a population of 161.

== History ==
The village of Thelveton was recorded in the Domesday Book as Telvetun. In 1603, there were 40 communicants, and in 1737 there were about 100 inhabitants and the area was valued for tax purposes at £376. On 1 April 1935 the parish was abolished and merged with Scole.

== Church ==
Thelveton has a church, which is dedicated to St. Andrew the Apostle. The church was constructed before 1466, and probably in the early 14th century; in 1736 it is described as being "a small building, consisting of a nave, chancel, and south porch, all tiled, and a square steeple". It was substantially refurbished in the Victorian period, giving the appearance of an entirely more modern construction, bar the 15th-century font it retains.
