= Ulmus 'Clusius' =

Elm cultivar

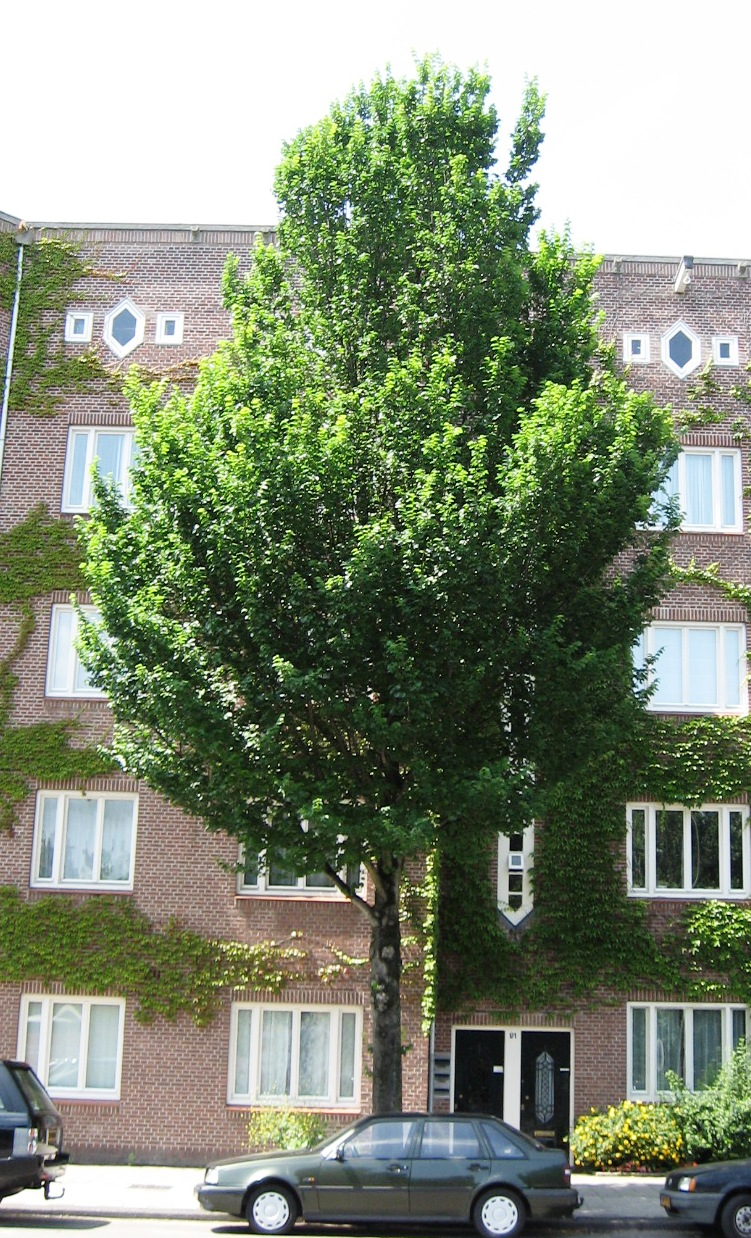
- Ulmus 'Clusius', Netherlands.
- Genus: Ulmus
- Hybrid parentage: ('Exoniensis' × U. wallichiana) × 'Bea Schwarz' selfed
- Cultivar: 'Clusius'
- Origin: Wageningen, The Netherlands

Ulmus 'Clusius' is a Dutch hybrid elm cultivar raised at the Dorschkamp Research Institute for Forestry & Landscape Planning, Wageningen, as clone 568 and released to commerce in 1983. 'Clusius' was derived from a crossing of the same Dutch clones that produced the fastigiate 'Lobel' released in 1973: '202' ('Exoniensis' × U. wallichiana) and '336' ('Bea Schwarz' selfed).

== Description ==
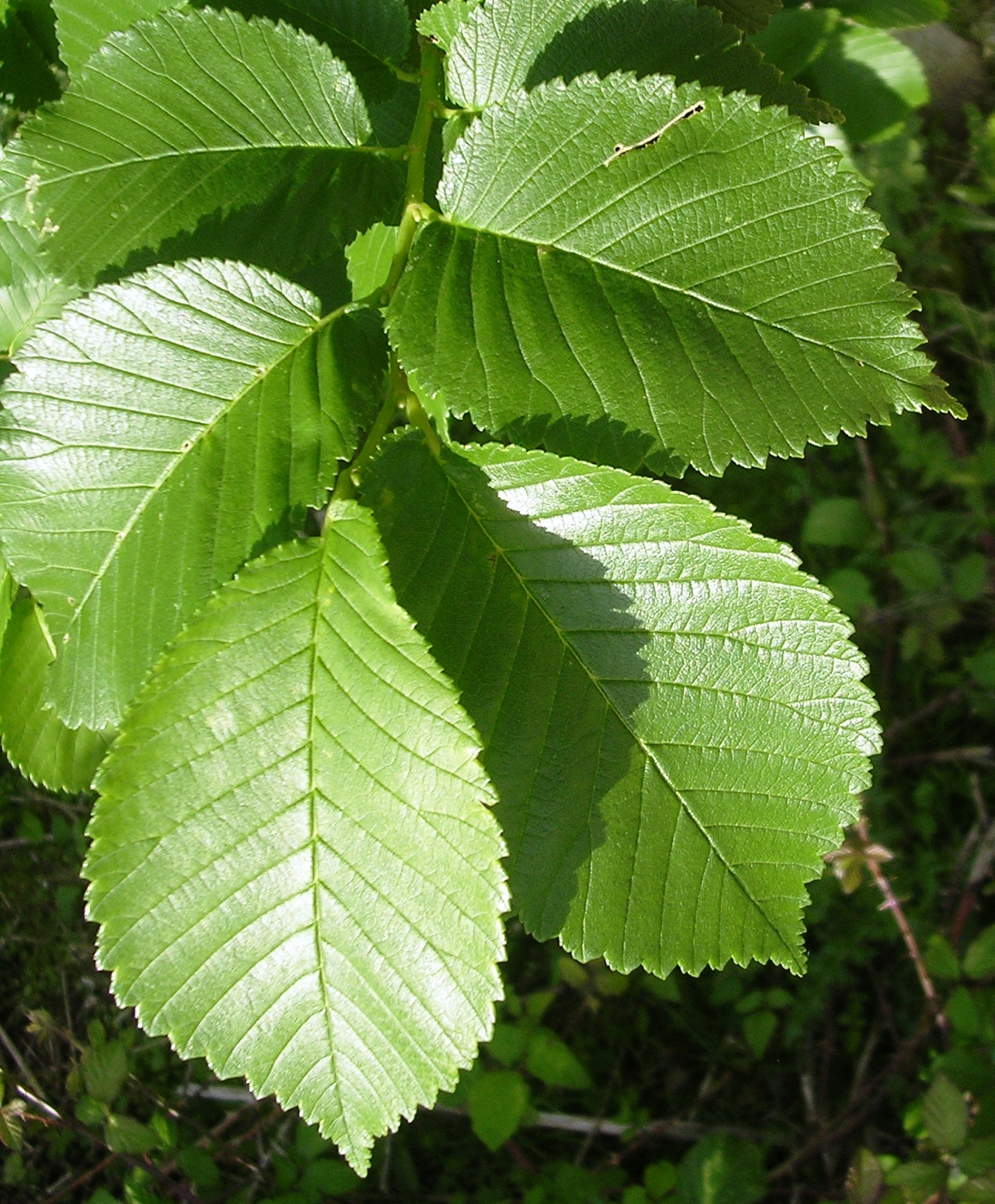
'Clusius' leaves, early June

The tree has a broader crown than its sibling's, whilst the generally obovate leaves, less than 11 cm long by 7 cm wide, are less acuminate at the apex and a lighter green. The seed is near the notch (apex) of the samara. Like 'Lobel', the tree flushes markedly later than most other elms, and is rarely in full leaf before mid-May.

== Pests and diseases ==
Whilst the resistance of 'Clusius' to Dutch elm disease proved marginally greater than that of its Dutch predecessors, rated 4 out of 5, it has been eclipsed by later developments such as Lutèce. Consequently, sales in the Netherlands declined from 7495 in 1989 to 600 in 2004.

== Cultivation ==
While 'Clusius' remains for sale in Europe, it is not recommended to be planted where the disease remains prevalent. In the Netherlands it has been planted in Kortenhoef since 2006 as part of Wijdemeren City Council's elm collection. In the UK, 'Clusius' is present in the National Elm Collection, Brighton and Hove, and in Edinburgh (two in Abbeyhill, opposite Holyrood Palace, and one in The Meadows). Six specimens were planted in front of the library, Keele University, Staffordshire, c.2010. 'Clusius' featured in New Zealand government trials during the 1990s at the Hortresearch station, Palmerston North, but is not known to have been introduced to North America.

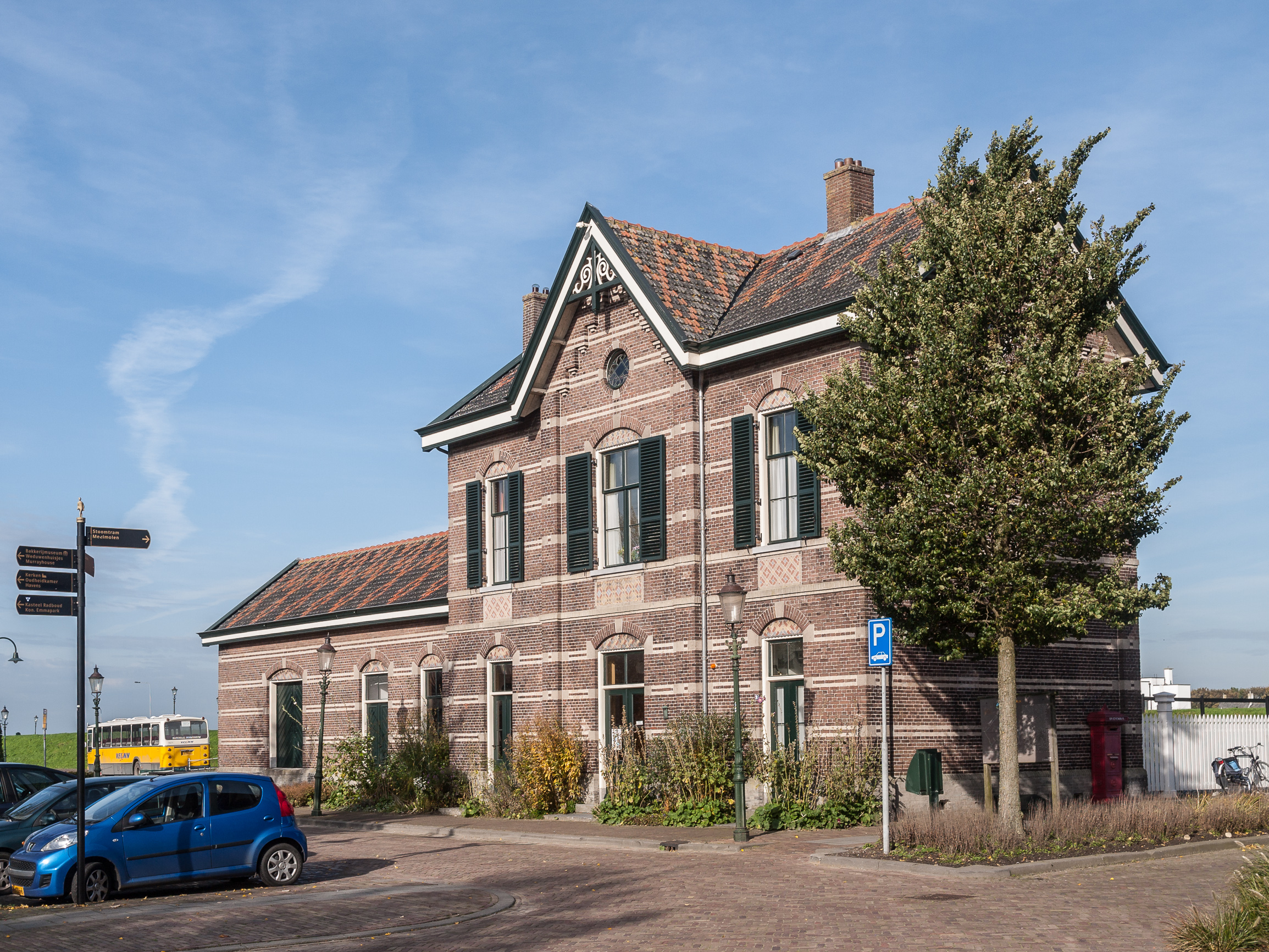
'Clusius', Medemblik train station (2013)

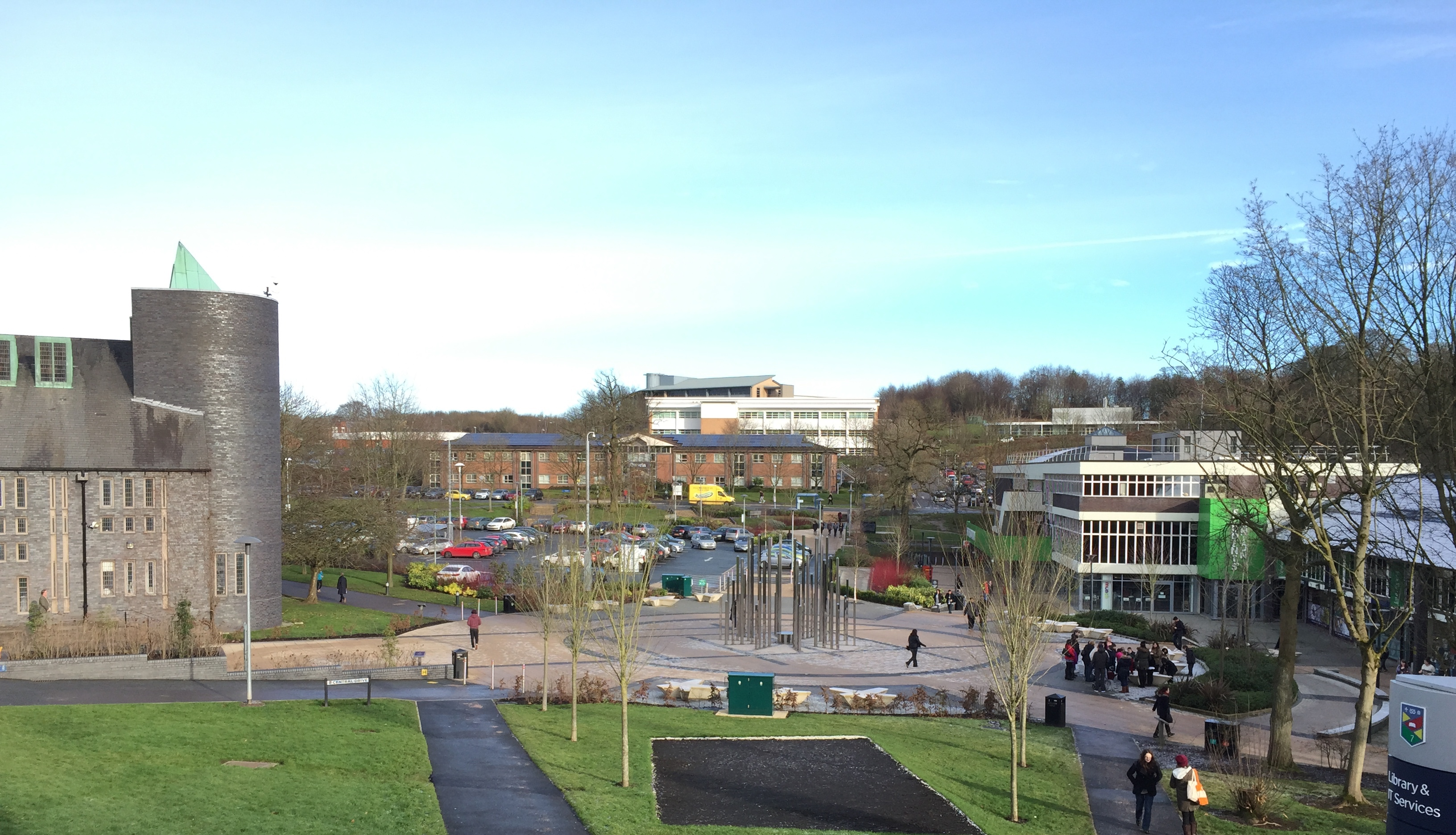
Six 'Clusius' in Union Square, Keele University (2015)

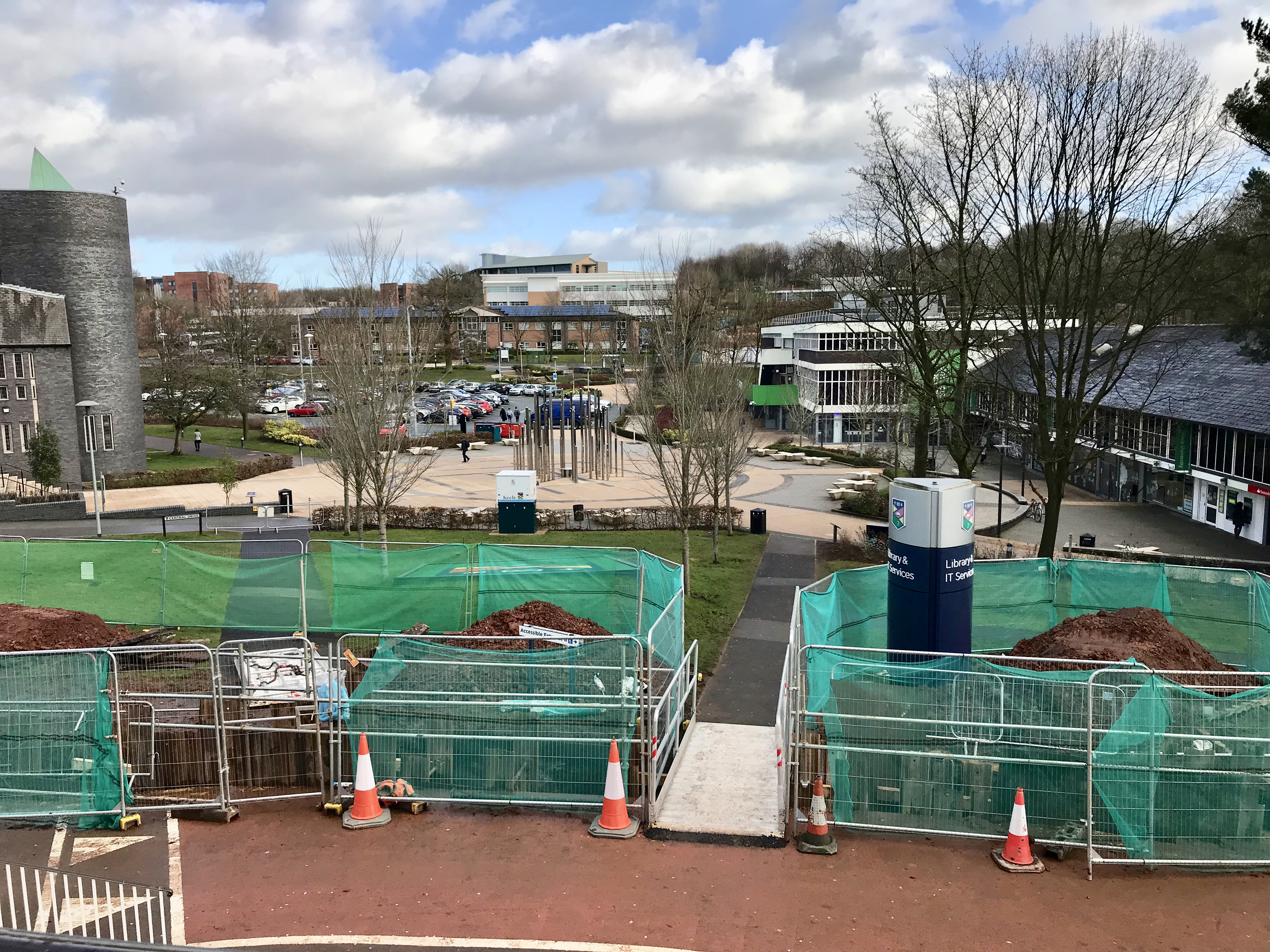
Same, 2018

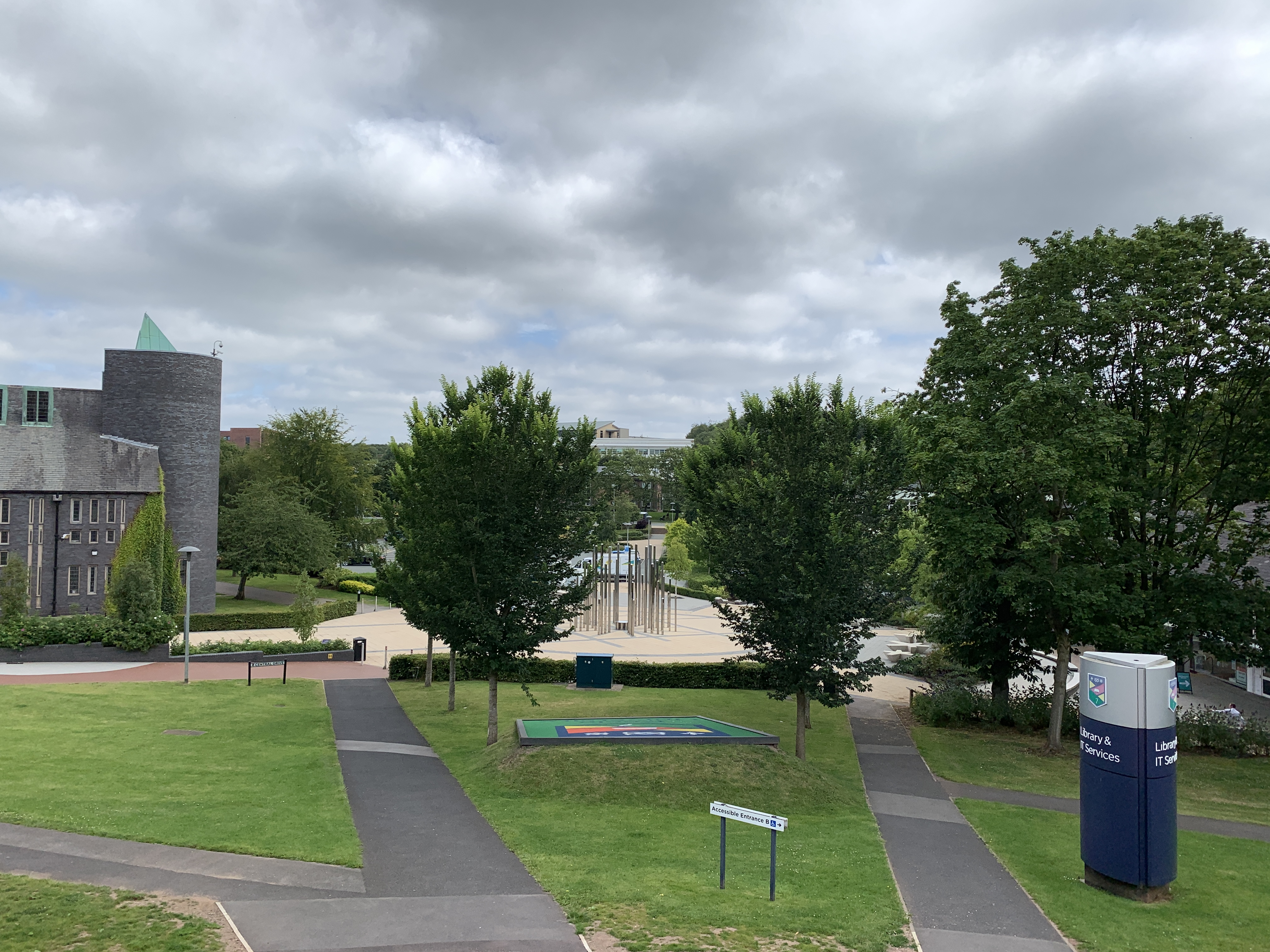
Same, July 2019

== Etymology ==
The cultivar is named for Carolus Clusius, a Dutch naturalist of the Renaissance.

== Accessions ==
Europe

- Arboretum de La Petite Loiterie , Monthodon, France. No details available
- Grange Farm Arboretum, Sutton St James, Spalding, Lincs., UK. Acc. no. 817.
- Sir Harold Hillier Gardens, Ampfield, Romsey, Hampshire, UK. Acc. no: 2019.0441

== Nurseries ==
- Noordplant , Glimmen, Netherlands.
- Barcham Trees PLC, Ely, Cambridgeshire.
