= Clusius =

Clusius may refer to:

- Carolus Clusius (1526–1609), Flemish doctor and botanist
- Klaus Clusius (1903–1963), German physical chemist
- Ulmus 'Clusius', a hybrid elm cultivar

== See also ==
- Gentiana clusii, commonly known as flower of the sweet-lady or Clusius' gentian
- Clusia, the type genus of the flowering plant family Clusiaceae
