= Ulmus 'Lobel' =

Elm cultivar

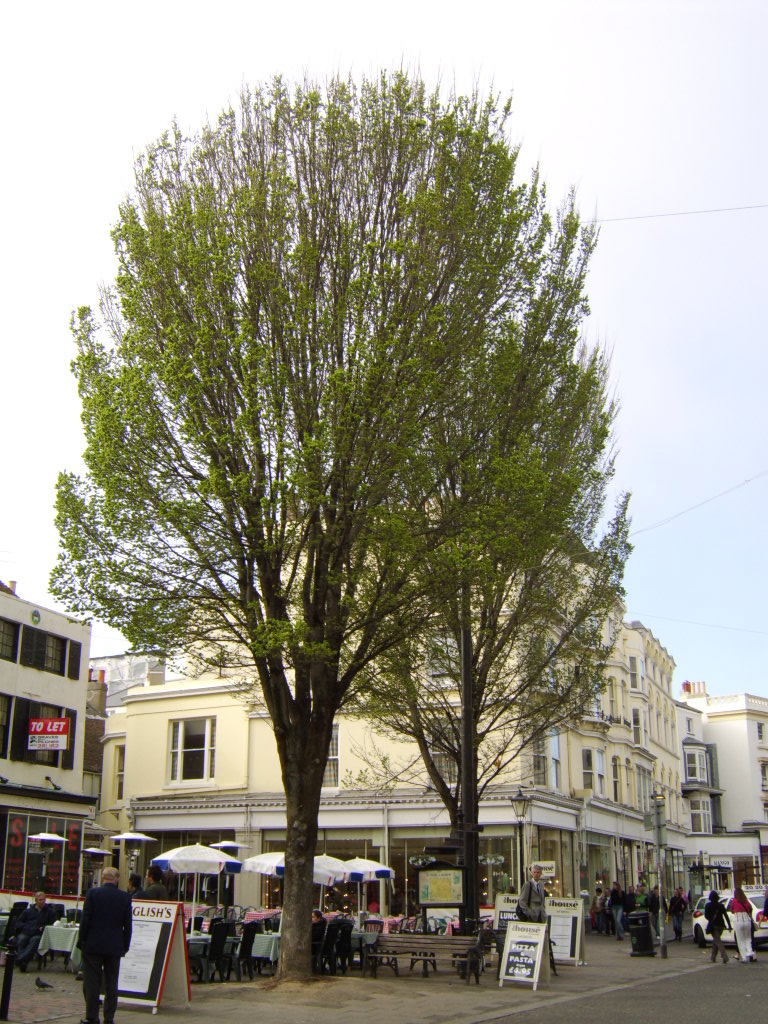
- 'Lobel' elms, East Street, Brighton, UK.
- Genus: Ulmus
- Hybrid parentage: '202' ('Exoniensis' × U. wallichiana) × '336' ('Bea Schwarz' selfed)
- Cultivar: 'Lobel'
- Origin: Wageningen, Netherlands

Ulmus 'Lobel' is a Dutch hybrid cultivar raised at the Dorschkamp Research Institute for Forestry & Landscape Planning, Wageningen, from a crossing of clone '202' ('Exoniensis' × U. wallichiana) with '336' ('Bea Schwarz', selfed). 'Lobel' was cloned in 1962 and released for sale in 1973.

== Description ==
'Lobel' is a fastigiate, small-crowned, tree not unlike the pyramidal Hornbeam Carpinus betulus 'Fastigiata'. The typically acuminate leaves are < 11 cm long × < 7 cm broad, and notably late to flush, rarely before mid-May.

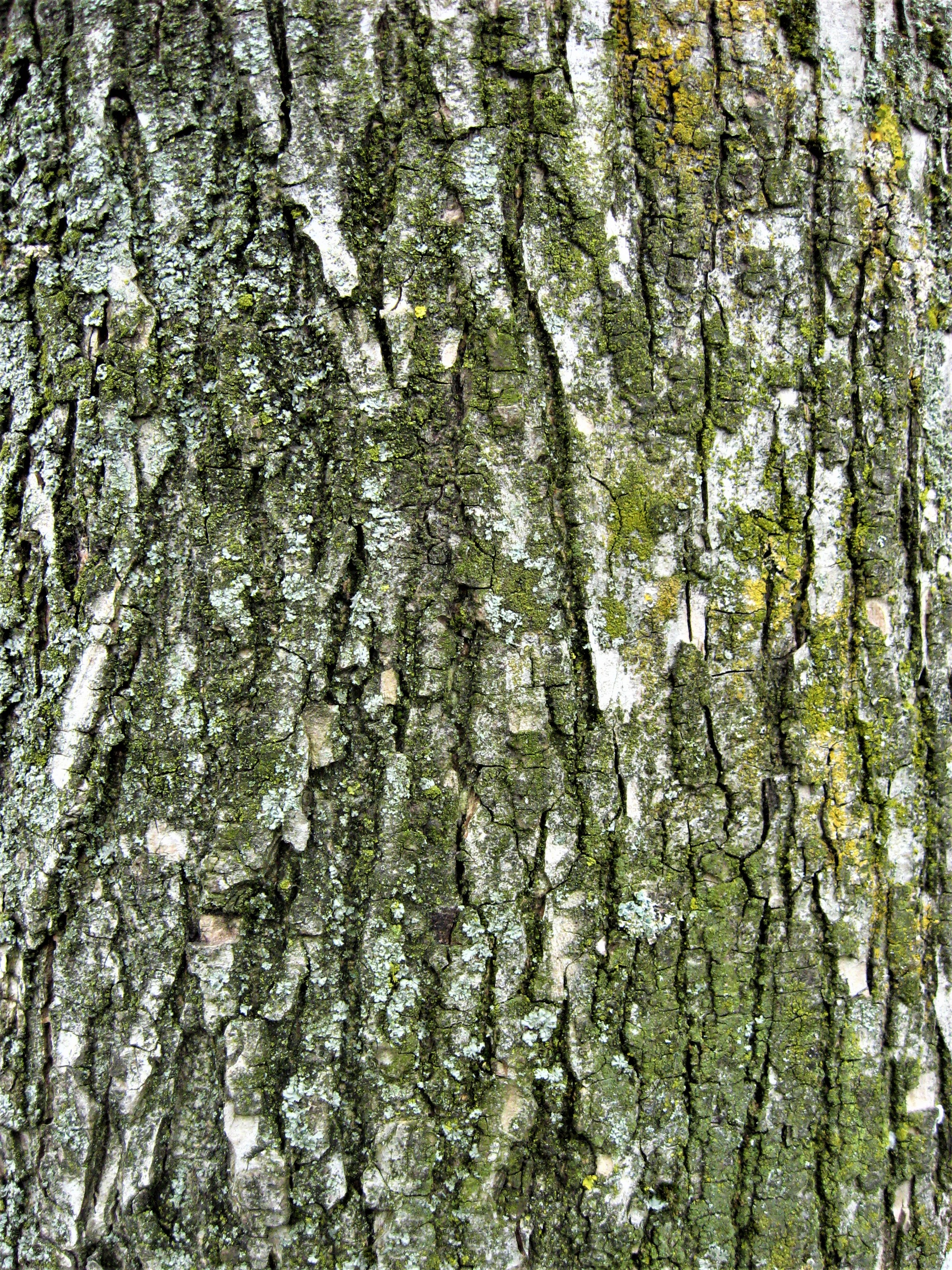
Bark of 35-year-old 'Lobel'

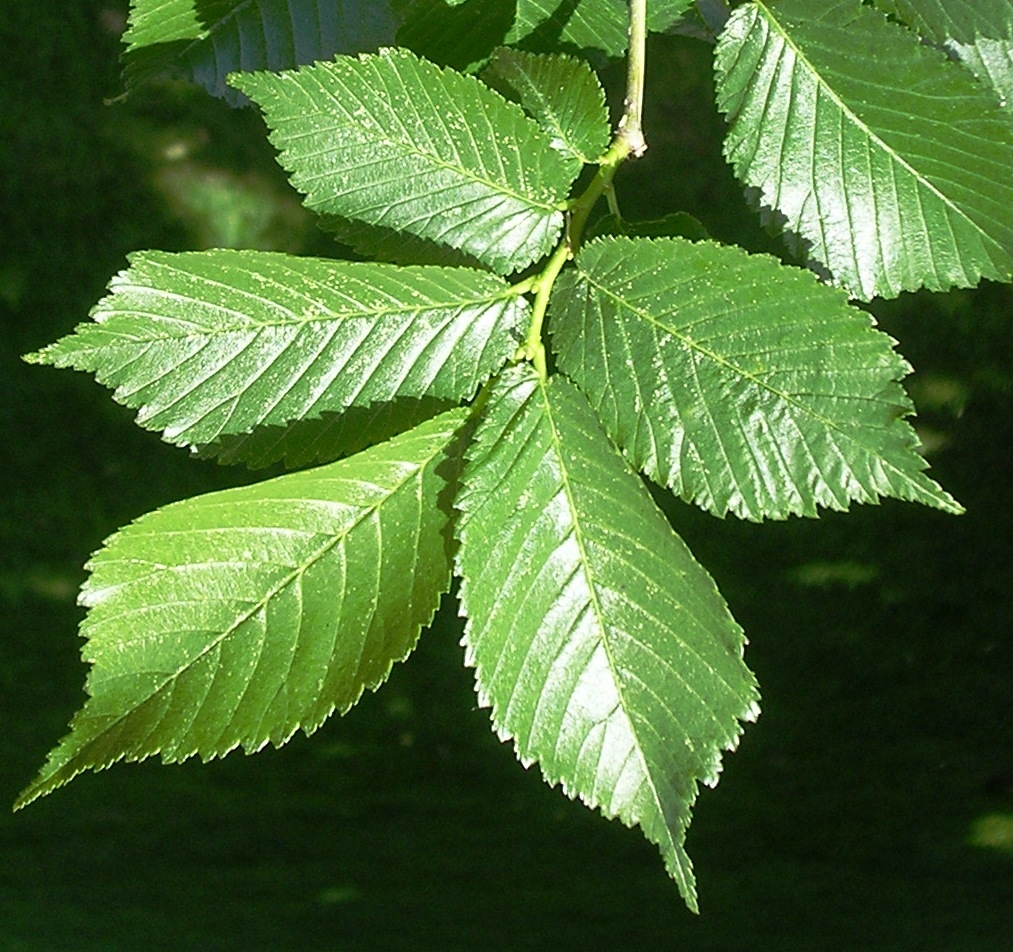
'Lobel' leaves

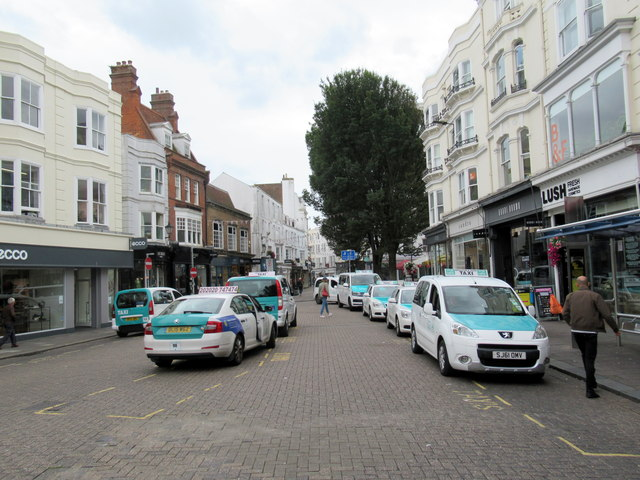
'Lobel' late summer colouring (September)

== Pests and diseases ==
'Lobel' was rated 4 out of 5 ("good") in the Netherlands for its resistance to Dutch elm disease. However, in trials conducted by the Istituto per la Protezione delle Piante, Italy, 'Lobel' suffered 50% defoliation and 35.5% dieback when inoculated with unnaturally high concentrations of the fungal pathogen, compared with 2.8% and 1.2% resp. for 'Sapporo Autumn Gold'.

Owing to the U. wallichiana in its ancestry, young specimens of 'Lobel' proved particularly susceptible to elm yellows (phloem necrosis) in trials in Italy.

== Cultivation ==
'Lobel' is particularly resistant to sea winds, and was accordingly planted in large numbers in the coastal provinces in The Netherlands and by Portsmouth City Council in the late 1980s, notably to replace the Huntingdon Elms lost in the Great Storm of 1987 along the Ladies' Mile on Southsea Common. There are also large plantings at Ealing and Primrose Hill, London, Brighton & Hove, and Havant. 'Lobel' was included in trials in Canberra, Australia, started in 1988 but has not thrived in that environment. The tree was introduced to North America in 1991 when Heybroek donated material to the North Central Regional PI Station, Iowa State University, but the tree is not known to have been commercially released there. It has also been planted in Christchurch, New Zealand, 95 specimens appearing in the Council elm list.

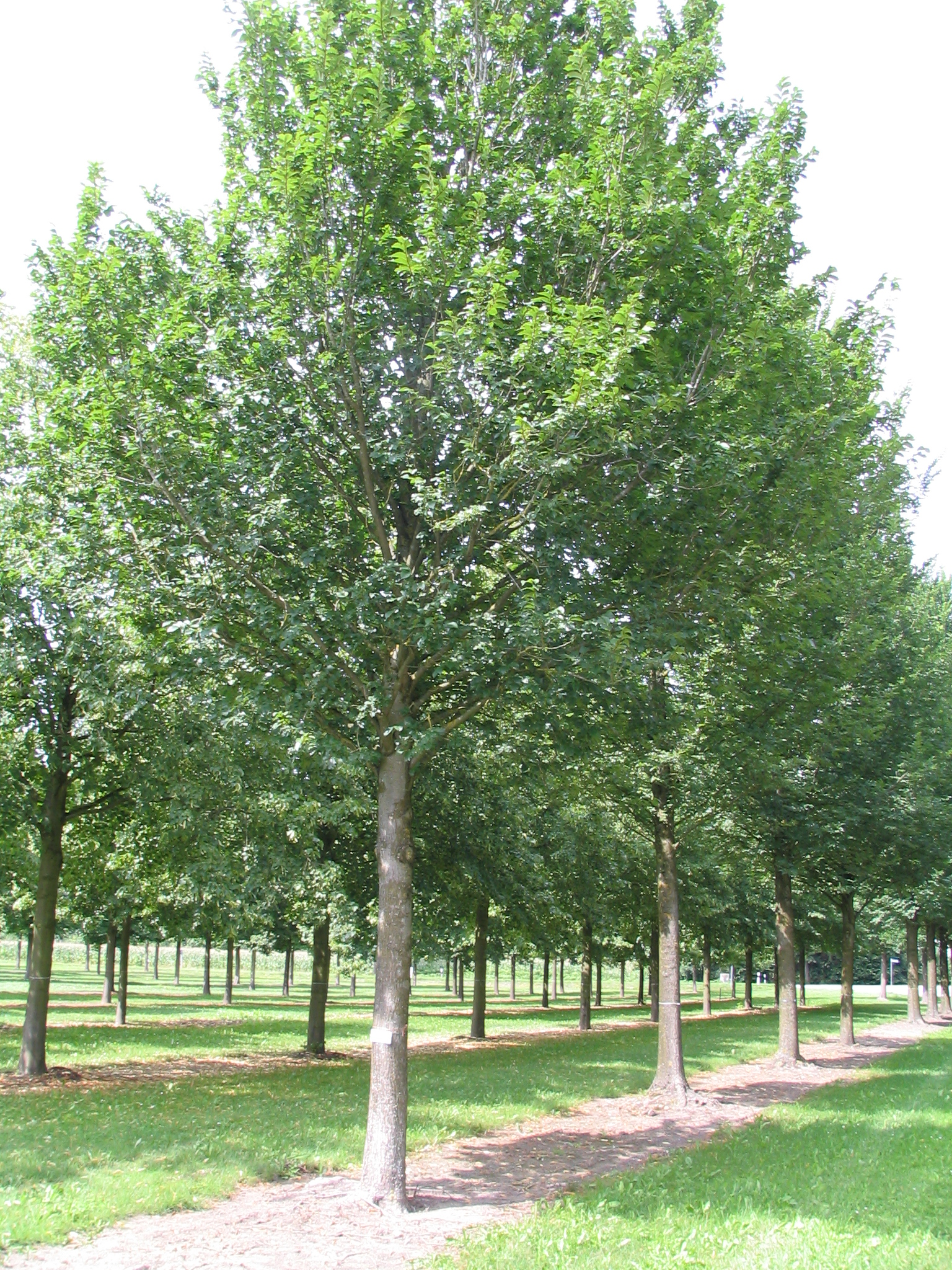
'Lobel', Bruns nurseries, Bad Zwischenahn

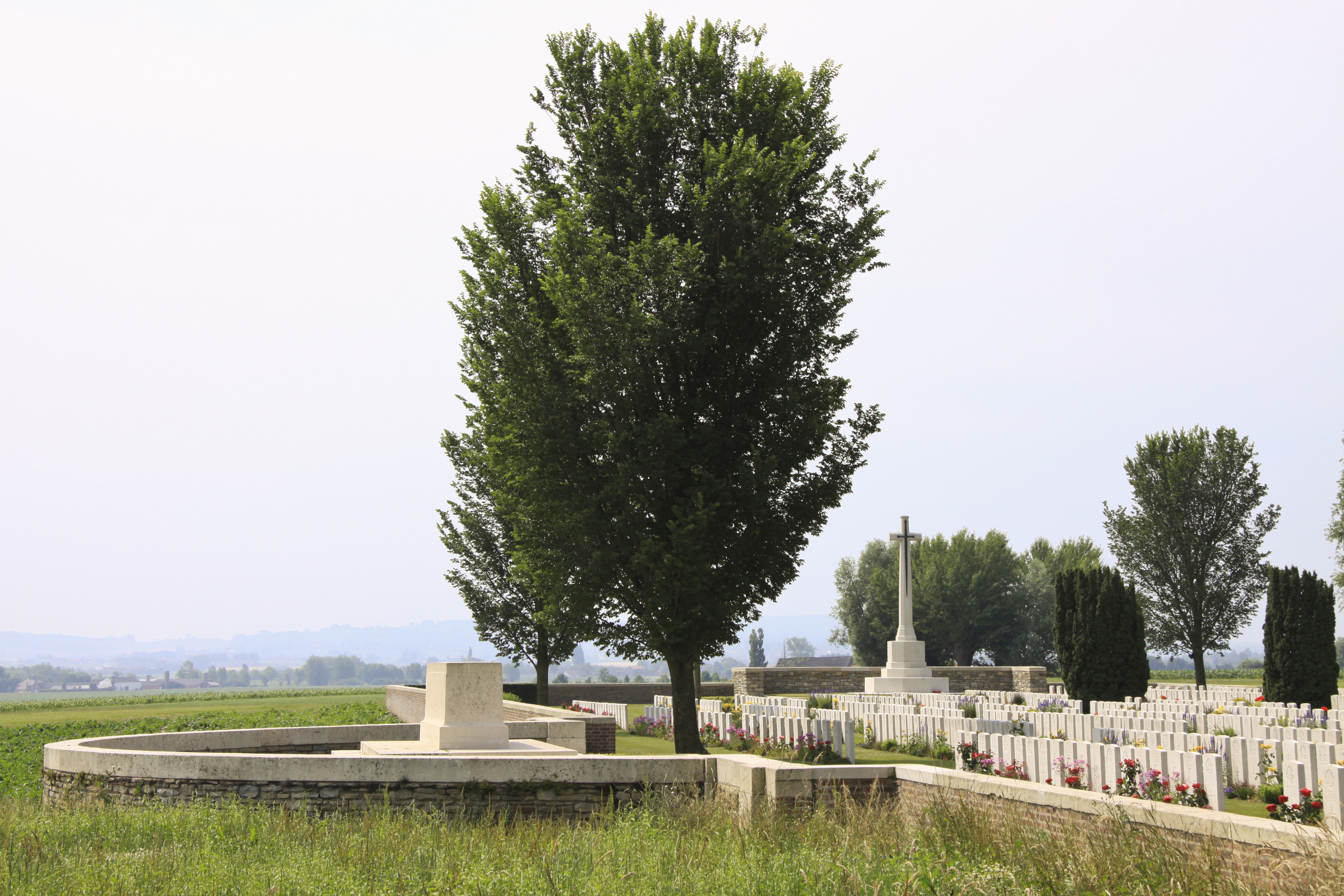
'Lobel', Nine Elms British Cemetery, Poperinge (2009)

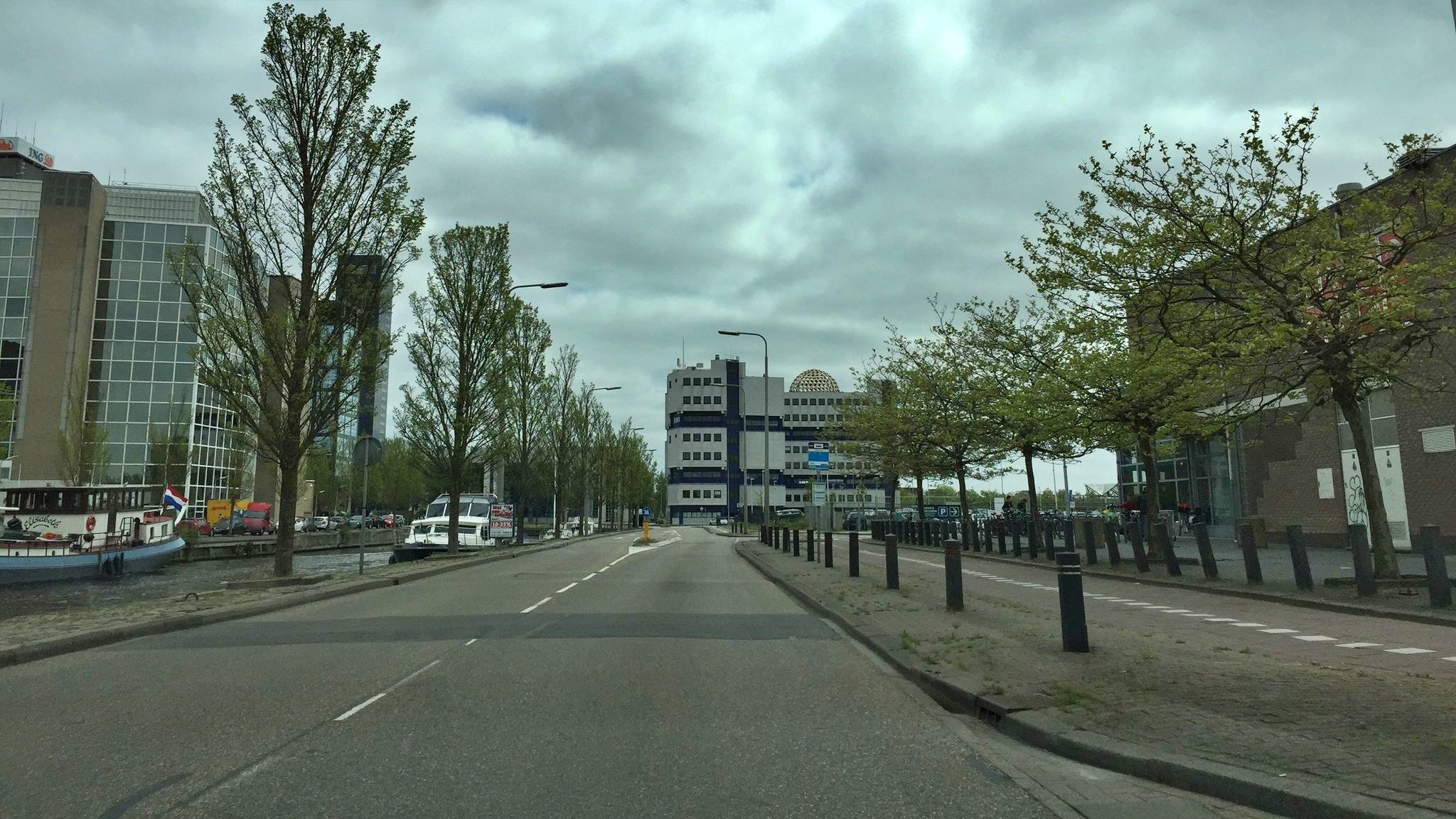
'Lobel', Snekertrekweg, Leeuwarden (2015)

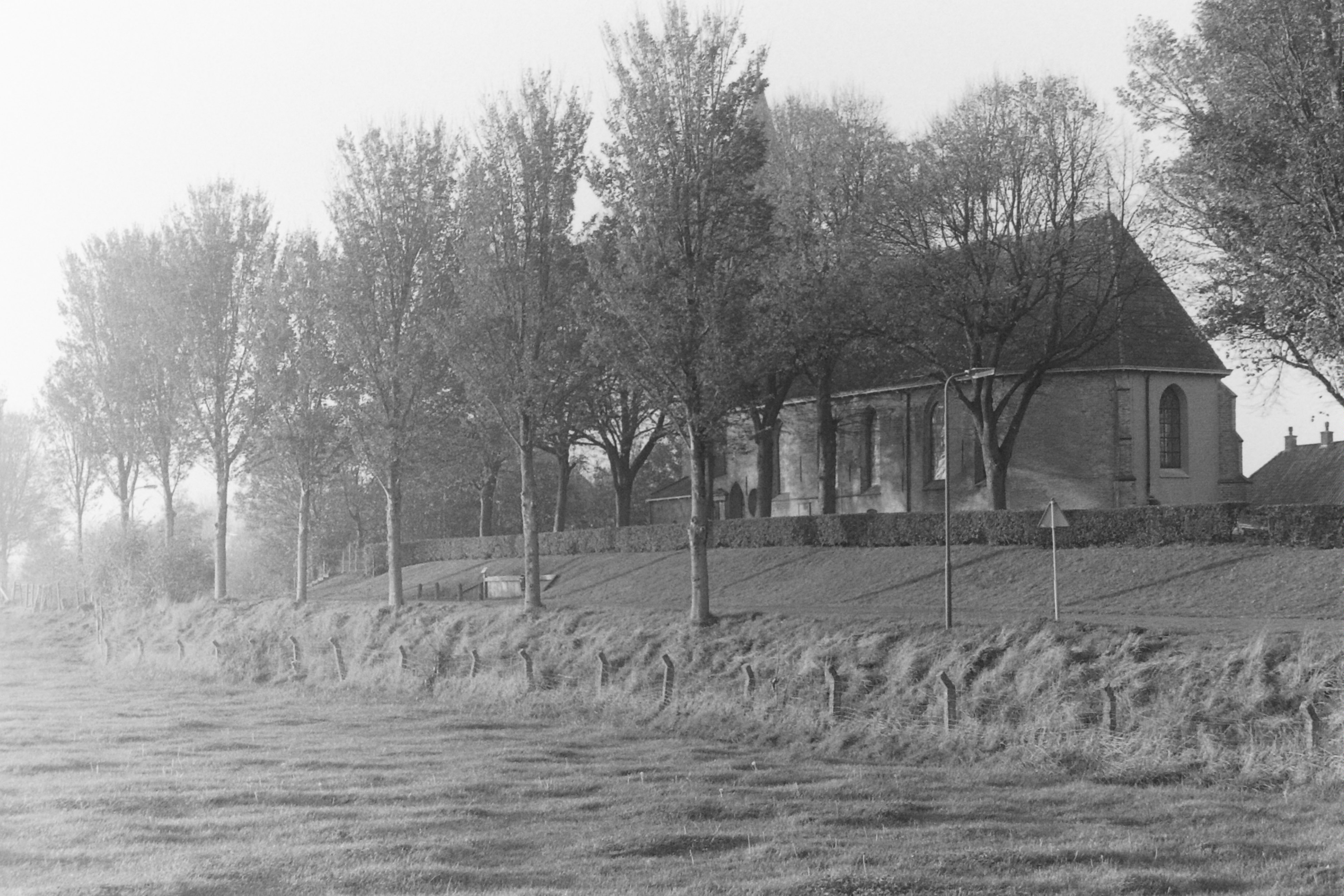
'Lobel' by Gertrudiskerk, Jonkerschap, Achlum, Friesland (2022)

Following the development and release of cultivars such as 'Columella' more resistant to Dutch elm disease, planting is no longer recommended wherever the disease is prevalent. Moreover, 'Lobel' was originally propagated by grafting onto U. glabra rootstocks, which has proven an unsatisfactory combination in the Netherlands leading to graft failures in maturity. Graft failure is the commonest cause of elm death in Amsterdam. Sales of 'Lobel' in the Netherlands declined from over 12,000 in 1989 to 1,100 in 2004. The tree is sometimes still cultivated in small numbers in the Netherlands, Wijdemeren City Council, for example, including it in Loosdrecht ('t Jagerspaadje, planted 2010, and ‘s-Gravelandsevaartweg, 2016) and in Ankeveen (Trapgans, 2007), as part of its elm collection.

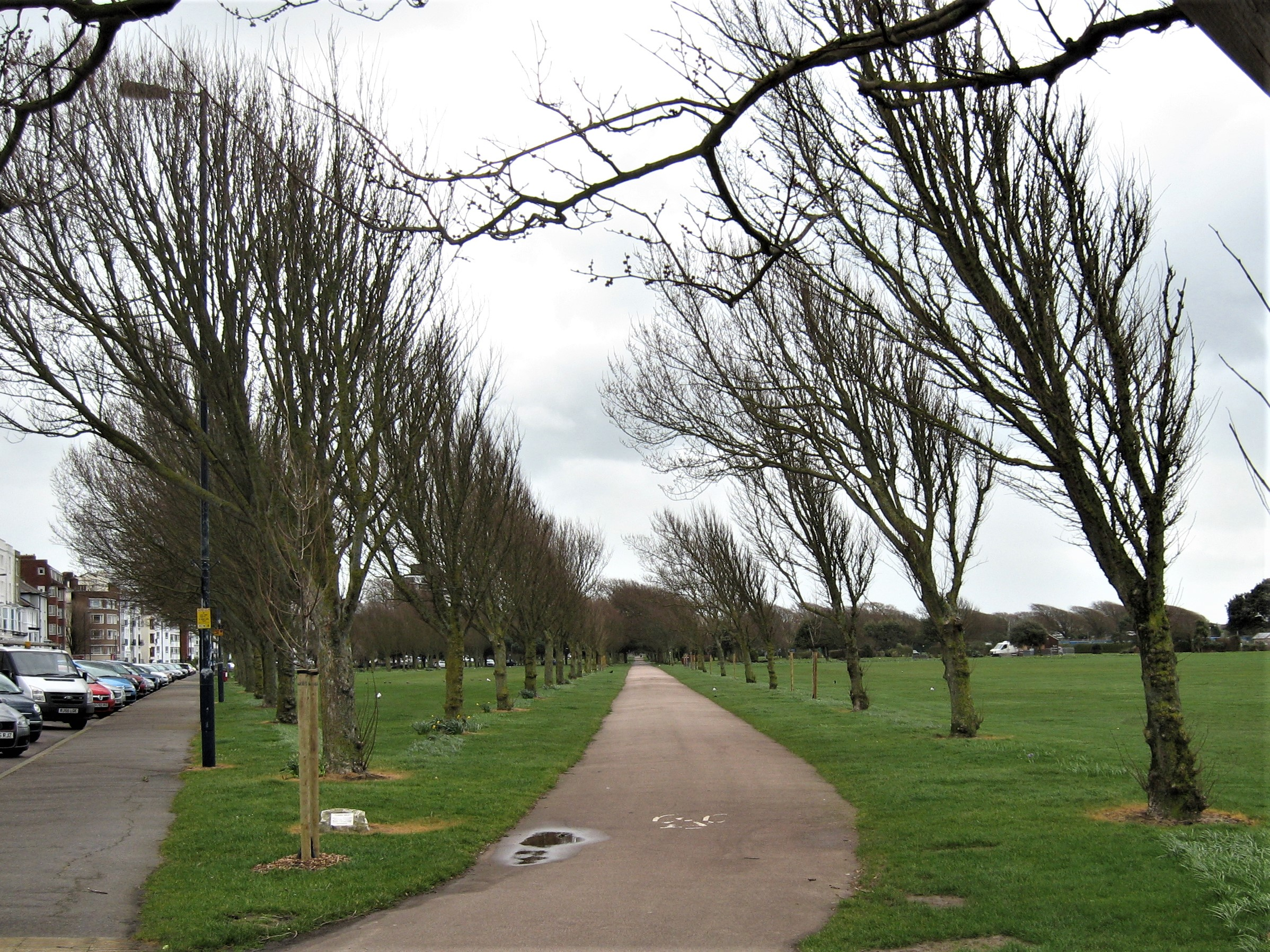
Wind-pruned avenue of 'Lobel', Southsea, UK

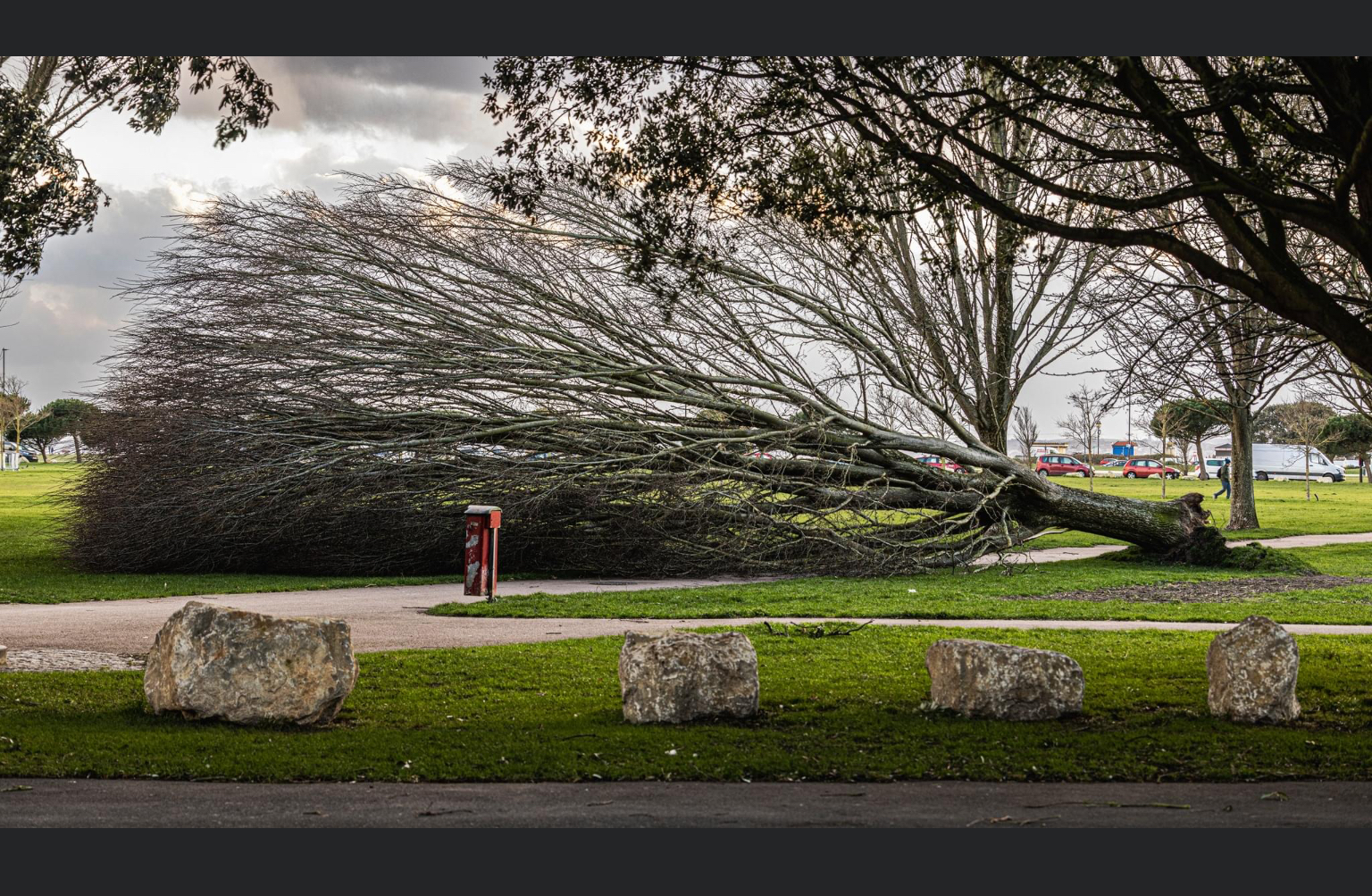
Graft failure on Southsea Common, UK

== Etymology ==
The tree is named for Matthias de L'obel, the Flemish botanist also commemorated by the genus Lobelia.

== Accessions ==
=== North America ===
- North Central Regional PI Station Arboretum, ARS, Iowa State University, Ames, US. Acc. no. Ames 24988

=== Europe ===
- Arboretum de La Petite Loiterie , Monthodon, France. No details available
- Brighton & Hove City Council, UK. NCCPG Elm Collection.
- Grange Farm Arboretum , Sutton St. James, Spalding, Lincs., UK. Acc. no. 821.
- Royal Botanic Gardens Kew, UK. Acc. no. 1980.729
