= Lobel =

Lobel is a surname. Notable people with the surname include:

- Anita Lobel, Polish-American illustrator of children's books
- Arnold Stark Lobel (1933–1987), American author of children's books
- Bob Lobel, American sportscaster in Boston, Massachusetts
- Dory Lobel, musician, songwriter and producer
- Edgar Lobel (1888–1982), papyrologist and editor of Greek lyric poetry
- Baron Loicq de Lobel, proposed the Bering Strait crossing
- Mary Lobel (1900–1993), English historian and wife of Edgar
- Matthias de Lobel (1538–1616), studied medicine in Leuven and Montpellier
- Mike Lobel (born 1984), Canadian actor
- Ofir Lobel, one third of The Prozak Trio
- Rob Lobel (born 1966), Canadian curler from Ontario

== Other ==
- Lobel's maple, Acer lobelii
- Ulmus 'Lobel', Dutch hybrid cultivar
- Lobel's of New York, a beef product company headquartered in Manhattan, New York City

== See also ==
- Löbel, a surname
- Lobeline
