= Lobing =

Lobing may refer to

- Acoustic lobing, radiation pattern exhibited by multi-driver loudspeakers
- Lobe (disambiguation), for the various uses of the term lobe
