= Ulmus 'Amsterdam' =

Elm cultivar

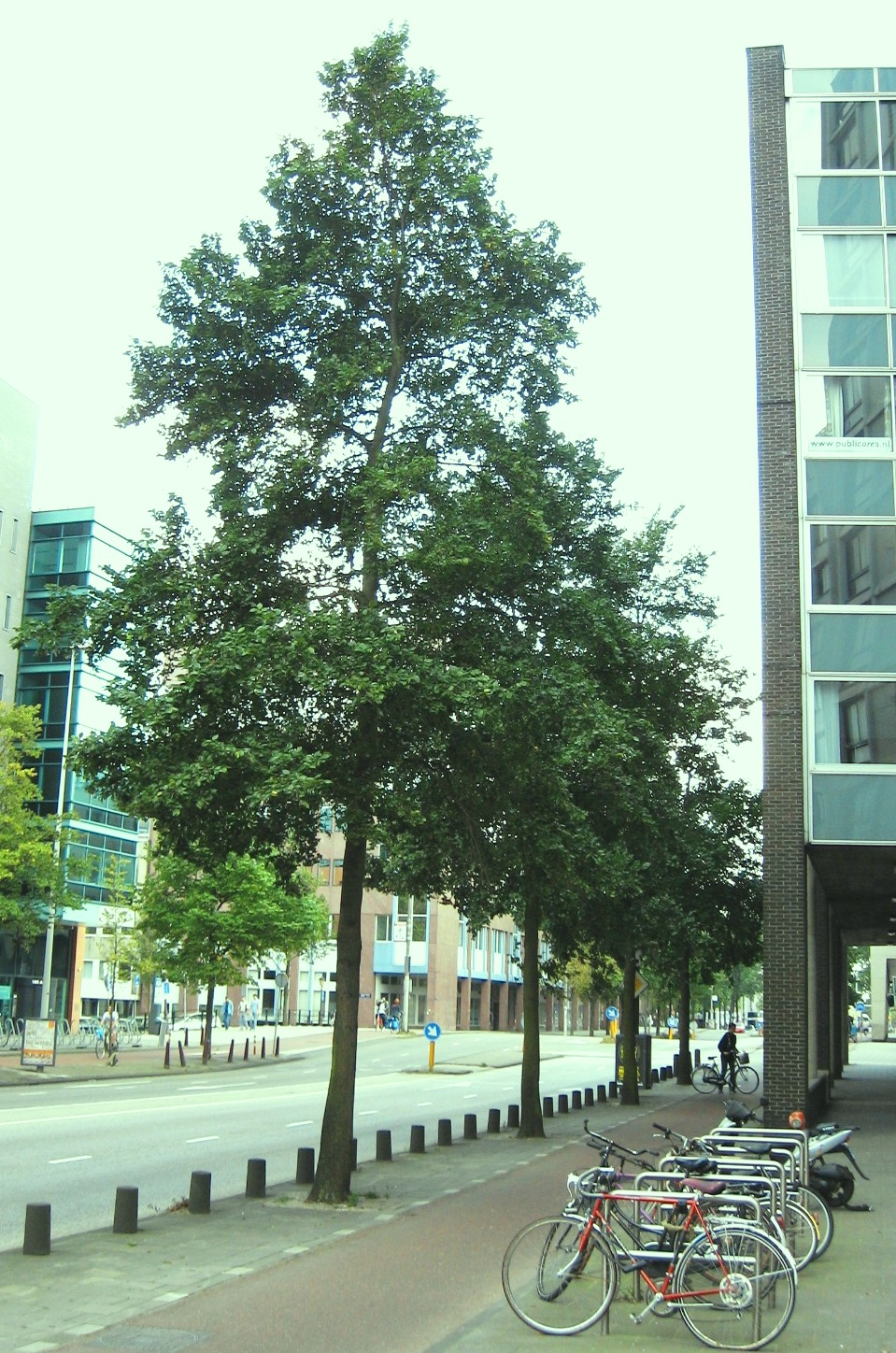
- Ulmus 'Amsterdam'
- Genus: Ulmus
- Hybrid parentage: 'Bea Schwarz' × U. minor
- Cultivar: 'Amsterdam'
- Origin: Baarn, The Netherlands

Ulmus 'Amsterdam' is a Dutch cultivar raised at the Huis Groeneveld in Baarn from a crossing by Hanneke Went in 1942 of the early cultivar Ulmus minor 'Bea Schwarz' with another French U. minor, and introduced by Albert Hoekstra, former director of Amsterdam's horticulture department. In the Netherlands it is classified as Ulmus minor 'Amsterdam'.

== Description ==
'Amsterdam' is very slender growing in its youth, with rather small, light green leaves. Eventually it becomes a medium-sized tree with a narrow ovate crown. The leaves turn a rich yellow in autumn and remain attached to the tree for a period much longer than is normal for the genus. The tree is also distinguished by its trunk, which widens conspicuously at the base.

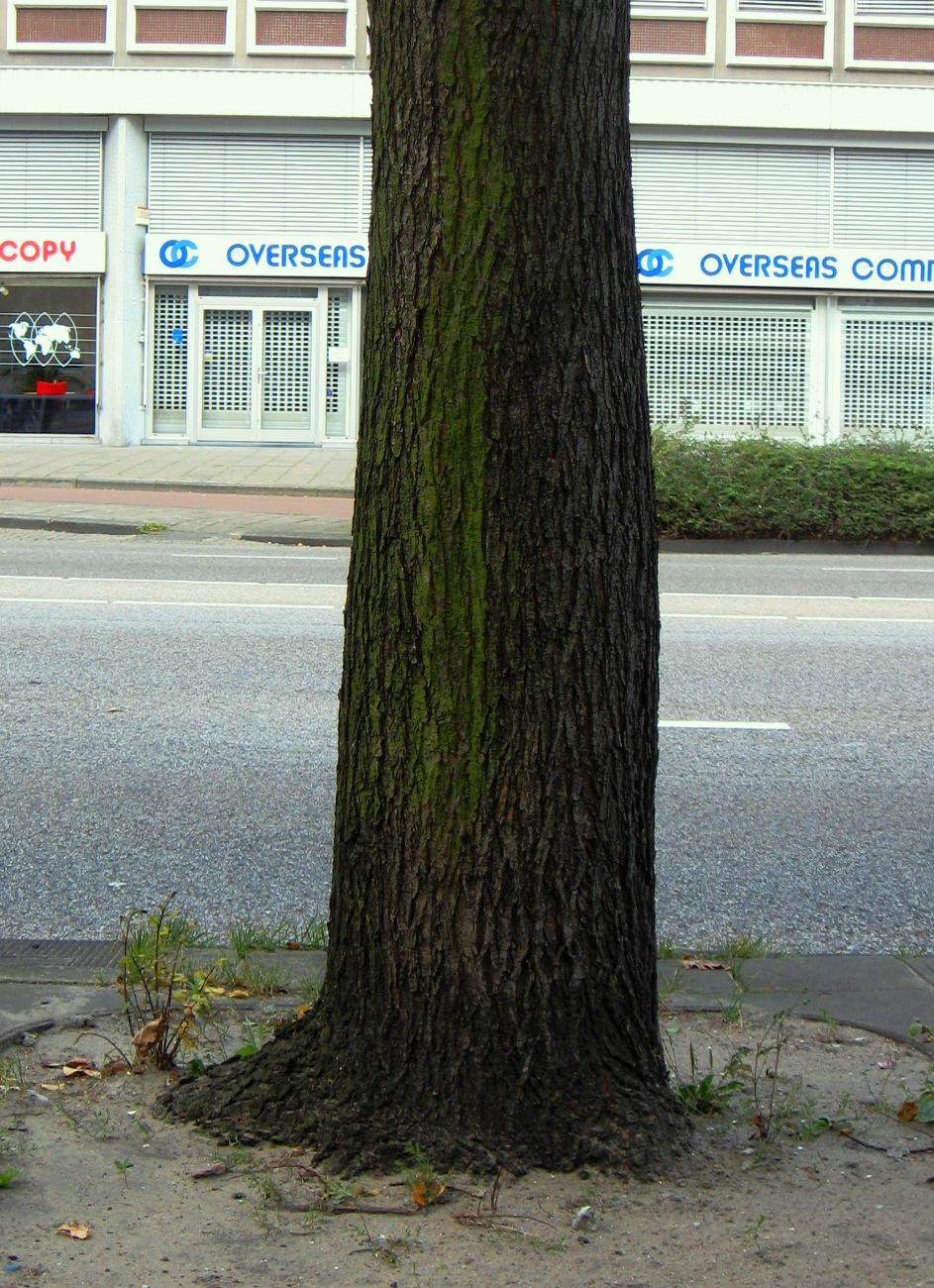
Trunk base

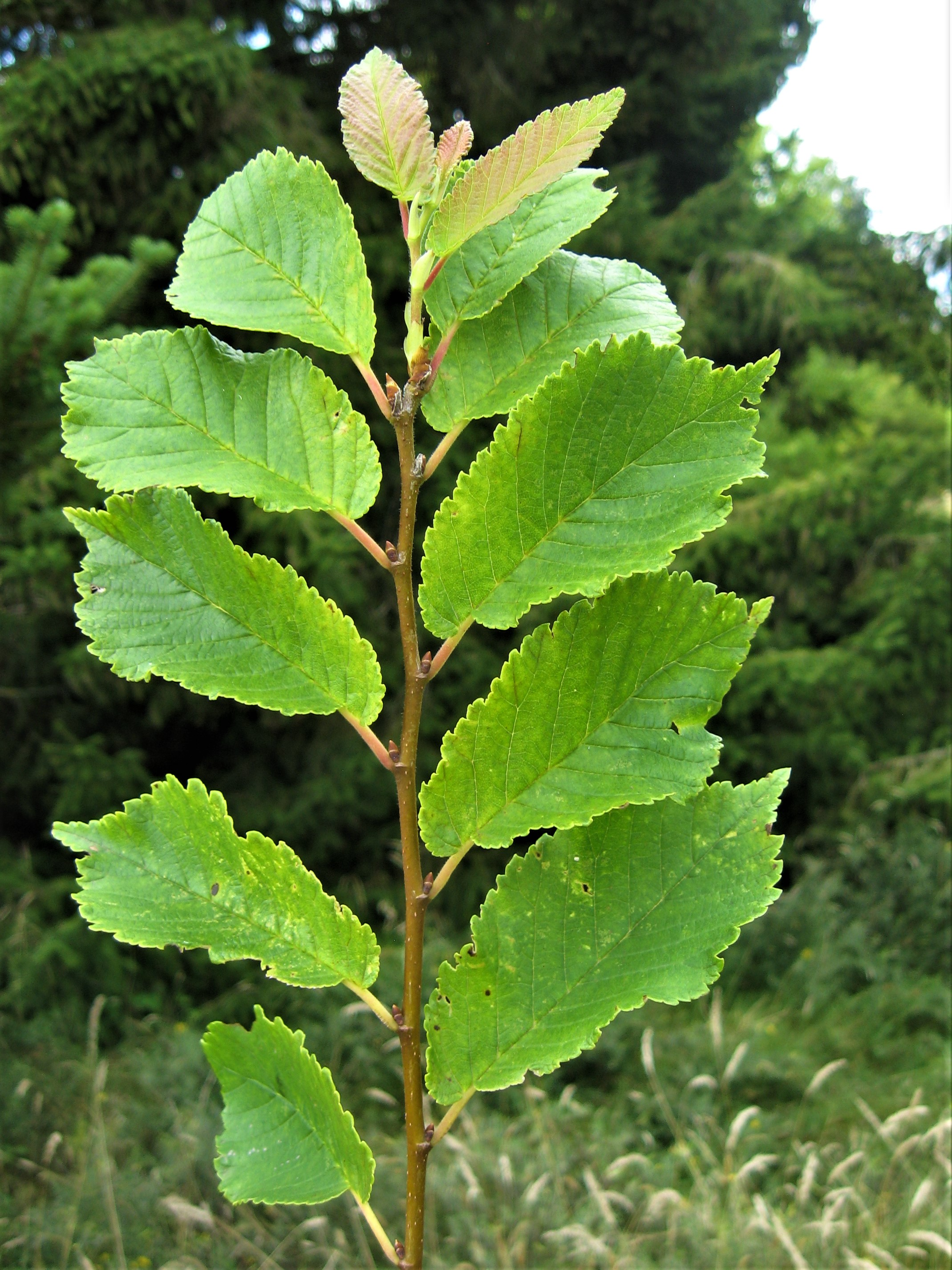
'Amsterdam' leaves

== Pests and diseases ==
The tree has a moderate resistance to Dutch elm disease, rated as 3/5.

== Cultivation ==
'Amsterdam' is perceived to be ideally suited to urban locations where trees of small size are preferred. The cultivar has had only a very limited impact on the Dutch townscape, largely restricted to the streets of Amsterdam, notably the Weesperstraat. Among rural plantings in the Netherlands are three trees by the roundabout at the south end of the Iepenallee 's-Gravelandsevaartweg, Loosdrecht, planted in 2019 as part of Wijdemeren City Council's elm collection, assembled since 2003 by tree manager Martin Tijdgat and his colleagues. The tree is little known beyond the Netherlands.

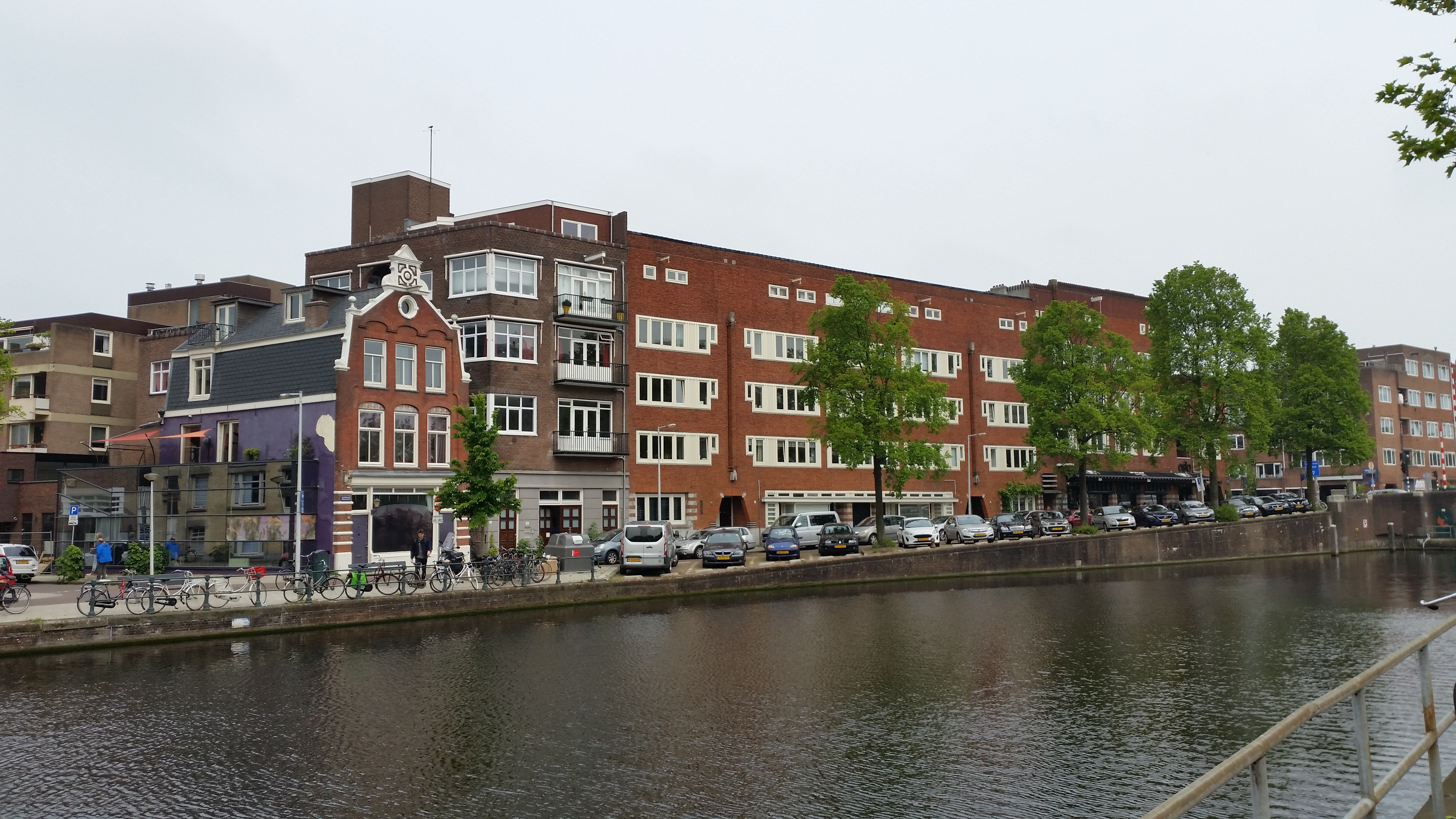
Line of 'Amsterdam' on the Sloterkade (2019)

== Etymology ==
Named for the city of Amsterdam.

== Accessions ==
=== Europe ===
- Grange Farm Arboretum, Sutton St. James, Spalding, Lincs., UK. Acc. no. 815.
- Sir Harold Hillier Gardens, UK. One specimen bordering Crookhill overflow parking area. Acc. no. 2017.0371

== Nurseries ==
=== Europe ===
- Noordplant , Glimmen, Netherlands.
