= Löbel =

Löbel, also spelled Loebel (German pronunciation: [ˈlœbl]) is a German surname.

Notable people with this surname include:

- Bettina Löbel (born 1962), German swimmer
- Bruni Löbel (1920-2006), German actress
- Hirshel Löbel, also known as Hirschel Levin (1721-1800), Polish rabbi
- Nikolas Löbel (born 1986), German politician

== See also ==
- Löbe
- Lobel (disambiguation)
