= Lobe =

Lobe may refer to:

== People with the name ==
- Lobe (surname)

== Science and healthcare ==
- Lobe (anatomy)
- Lobe, a large-scale structure of a radio galaxy
- Glacial lobe, a lobe-shaped glacier
- Lobation, a characteristic of the nucleus of certain biological cells
- Acoustic lobe, radiation pattern exhibited by multi-driver loudspeakers
- Delta lobe or deltaic lobe, the projection of a river delta mouth into standing water
- Roche lobe, the region of space around a star in a binary system within which orbiting material is gravitationally bound to that star
- Sidelobe, an identifiable segment of an antenna radiation pattern
  - Grating lobe, a sidelobe that is much higher than all other side lobes, approximately the same as the main beam — exists only in phased arrays
  - Main lobe, the lobe containing the maximum power

== Other uses ==
- Lobe, an oblong protrusion from a camshaft
- The Lobe, a character in Freakazoid!
- Lobes (album), a 2023 album by We Are Scientists

== See also ==
- Löbe, also spelled Loebe, a German surname
- Lõbe, village in Lääne County, Estonia
