= Löbe =

Löbe and Loebe (German pronunciation: [ˈlœbə]) are German surnames, and Loebe is also a given name.

Notable people with the surname include:

- Alexander Löbe (born 1972), German football player
- Bernd Loebe (born 1952), German journalist, opera manager and festival manager
- János Löbe (born 1995), German football player
- Loebe Julie (1920-2015), American engineer
- Paul Löbe (1875-1967), German politician
- Rebecca Loebe (born 1983), American musician, singer-songwriter, and record producer

== See also ==
- Lobe (disambiguation)
- Löbel
