= Ulmus 'Nanguen' =

Elm cultivar

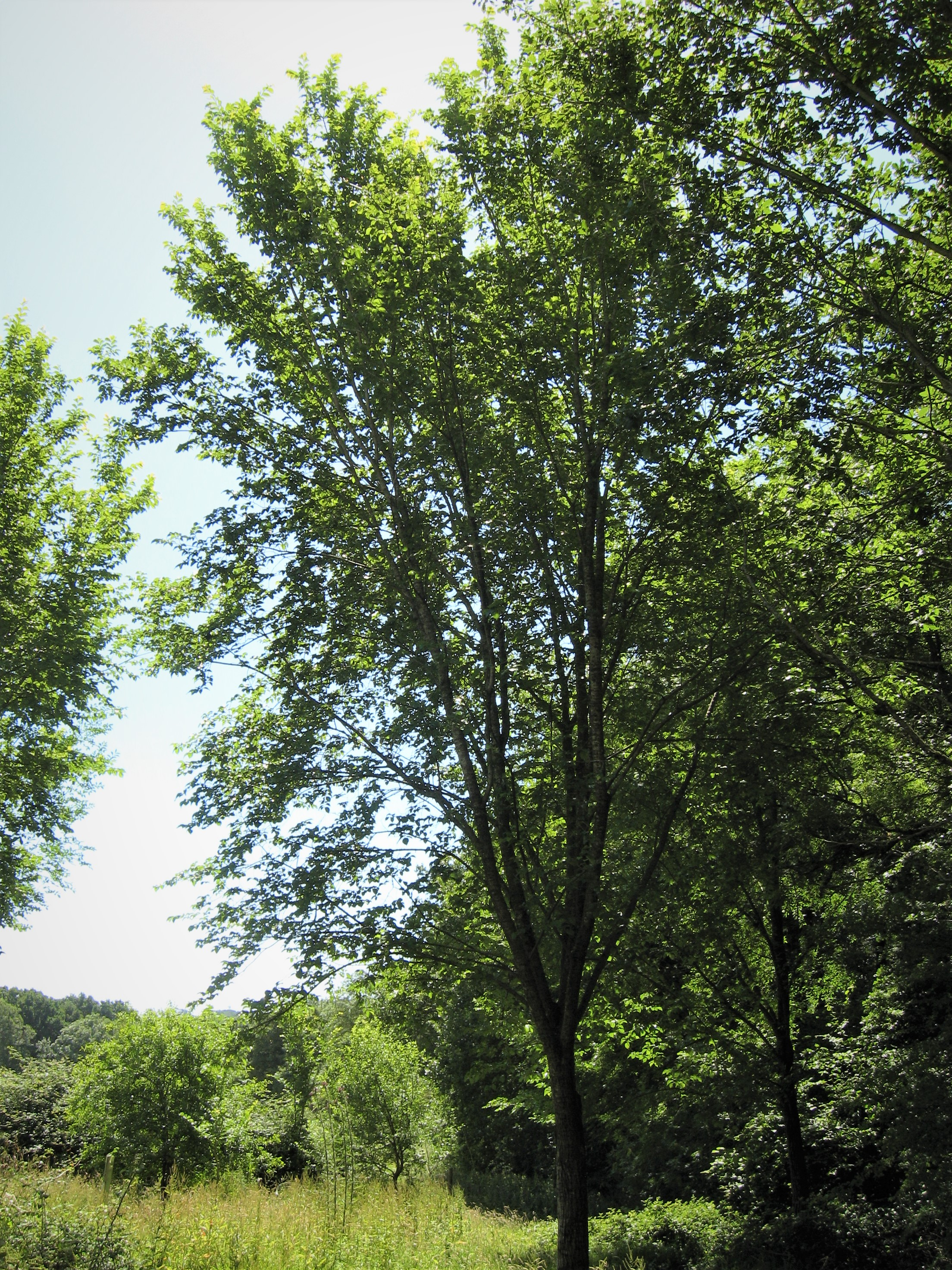
- Lutèce aged 20 years, Great Fontley, UK
- Genus: Ulmus
- Hybrid parentage: 'Plantyn' × ('Bea Schwarz' × 'Bea Schwarz' selfed)
- Cultivar: 'Nanguen' = Lutece
- Origin: Wageningen, The Netherlands

Ulmus 'Nanguen' (selling name Lutèce) is a complex fourth generation Dutch hybrid cultivar raised in 1970 at the Dorschkamp Research Institute for Forestry & Landscape Planning, Wageningen. Lutèce was derived from the cross 'Plantyn' × ('Bea Schwarz' selfed [clone '336']), an ancestry comprising four field elms (U. minor), a wych elm (U. glabra), the curious Exeter Elm ('Exoniensis'), and a frost-resistant selection of the Himalayan elm (U. wallichiana).

Originally identified as clone '812', Lutèce was not promoted by the Dutch owing to unfounded fears that it may prove susceptible to coral spot fungus (Nectria cinnabarina). Instead, patent for '812' was acquired by the French Institut National de la Recherche Agronomique (INRA), which subjected the tree to 20 years of field trials in the Bois de Vincennes, Paris, before release in 2002 as 'Nanguen' = Lutèce. Lutèce has been deemed the modern cultivar most closely resembling the native European elms.

Unlicenced propagation of Lutèce is prohibited under Certificat d'Obtention Végétale (COV) EU 17197 until its expiry on 31 December 2036.

== Description ==
The stem of Lutèce typically forks at a height of 1–2 m, where 3–5 steeply ascending branches develop in conjunction with more obtusely angled lower side branches to form an amorphous open crown. The ultimate size and shape of this cultivar remain unknown but, given its ancestry, it should make a large tree. The trees planted in the Bois de Vincennes attained an average height of 12.5 m with a trunk diameter of 22 cm at 20 years of age. Quick growing on moist, well-drained soils, increasing in height by an average of 80 cm per annum, the tree commences flowering in late March when aged seven years. The leaves are elliptic to orbicular < 11 cm long × 9 cm wide, the acuminate apex far less pronounced than in most other elms, with coarse, doubly serrate margins; the upper surface is rough. The leaves flush relatively late, rarely before mid-May in England. The samarae are obovate, slightly notched at the outer end, 14–22 mm long by 11–17 mm broad. The seed is not central but slightly nearer the notch, and ripens in late May.

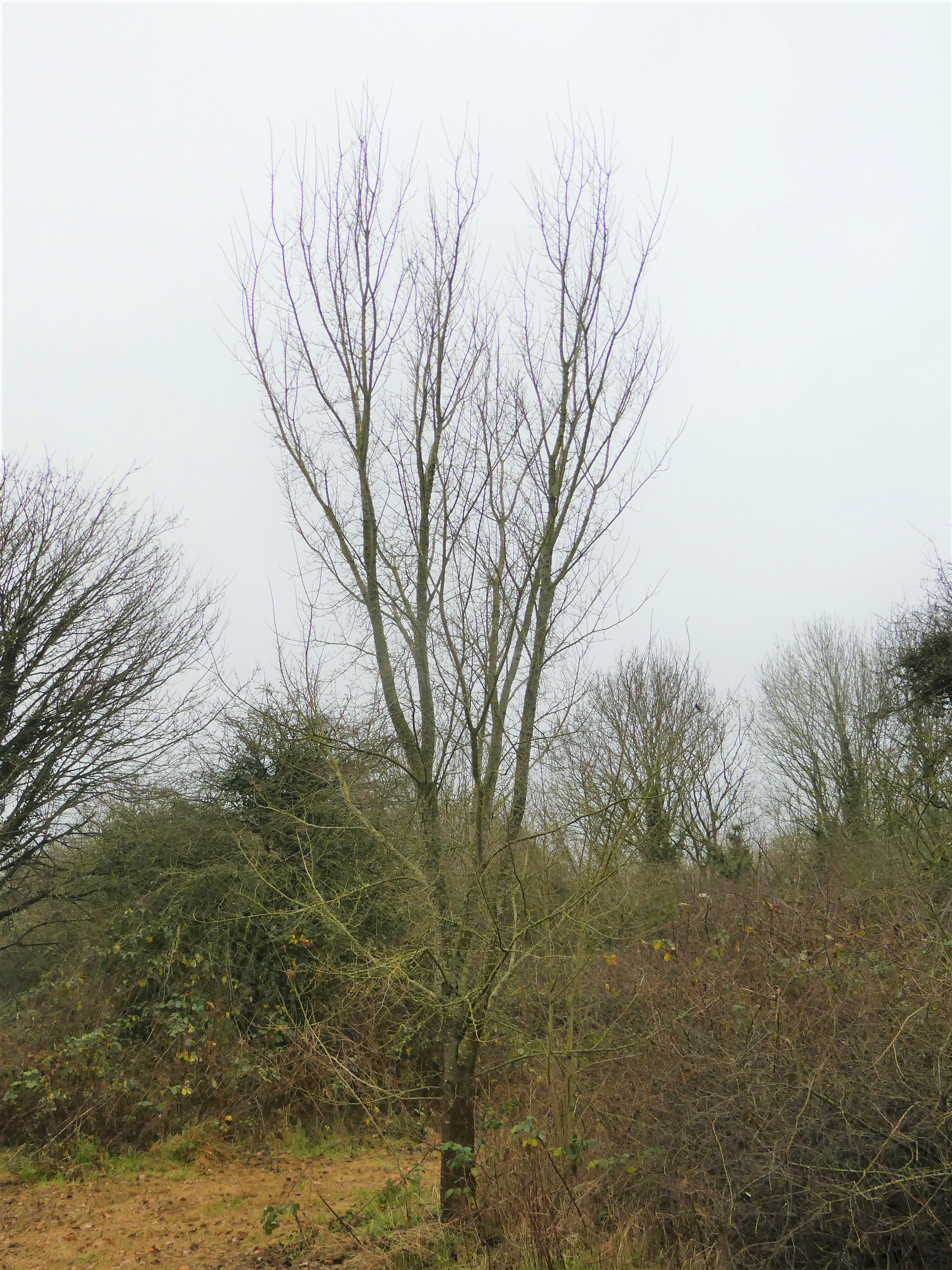
LUTECE in winter

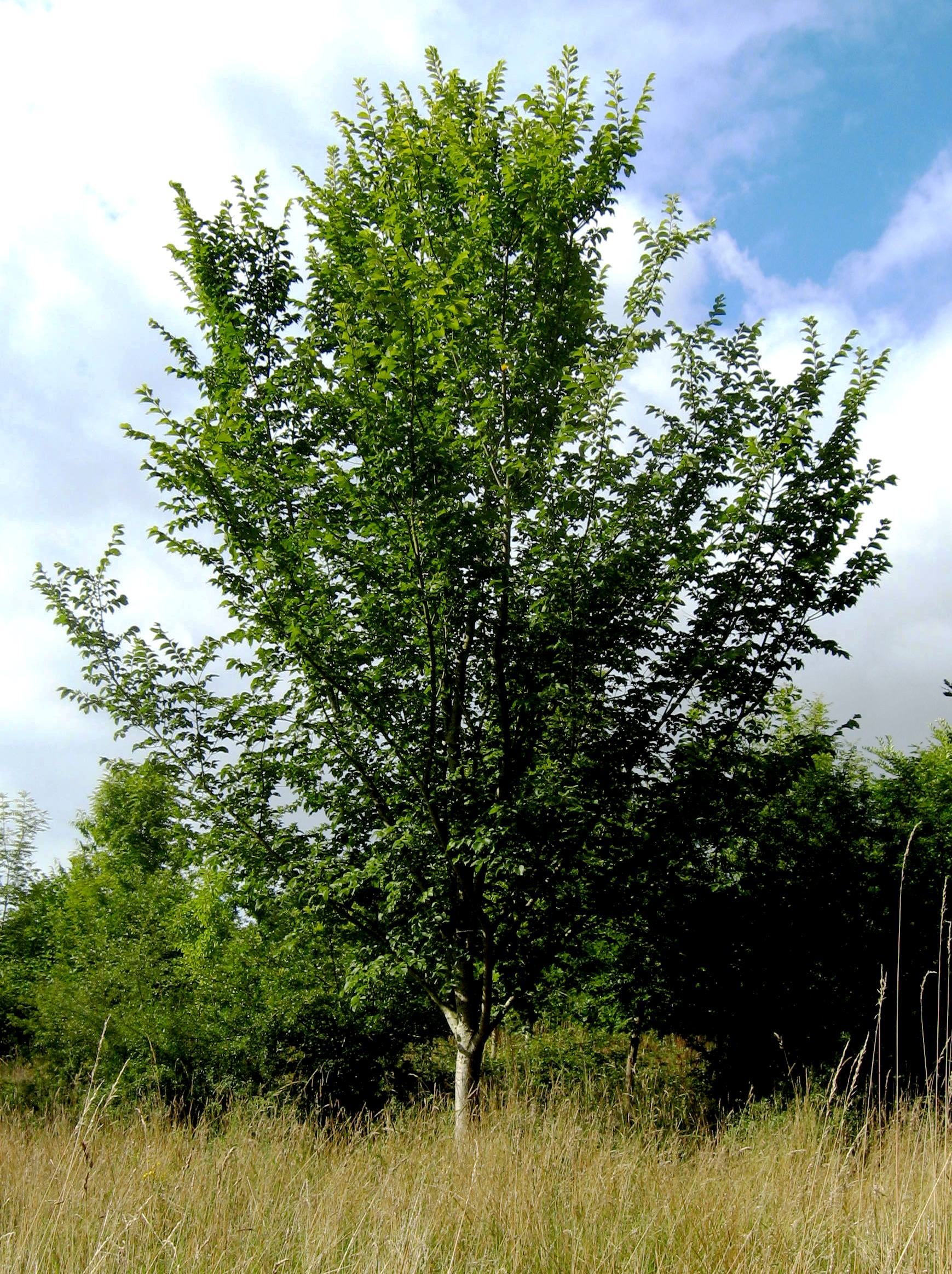
12 year-old Lutèce

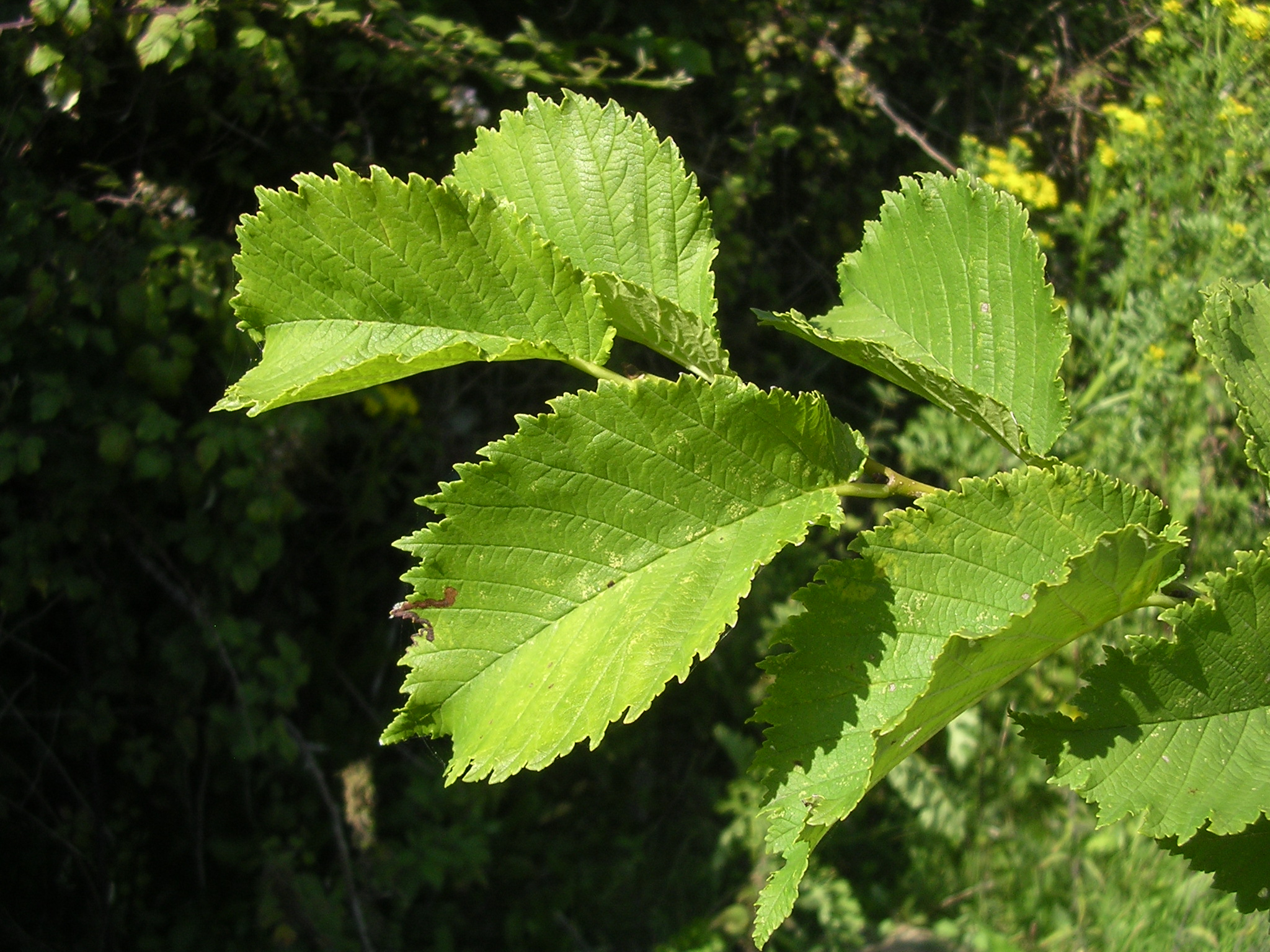
Lutèce leaves in July

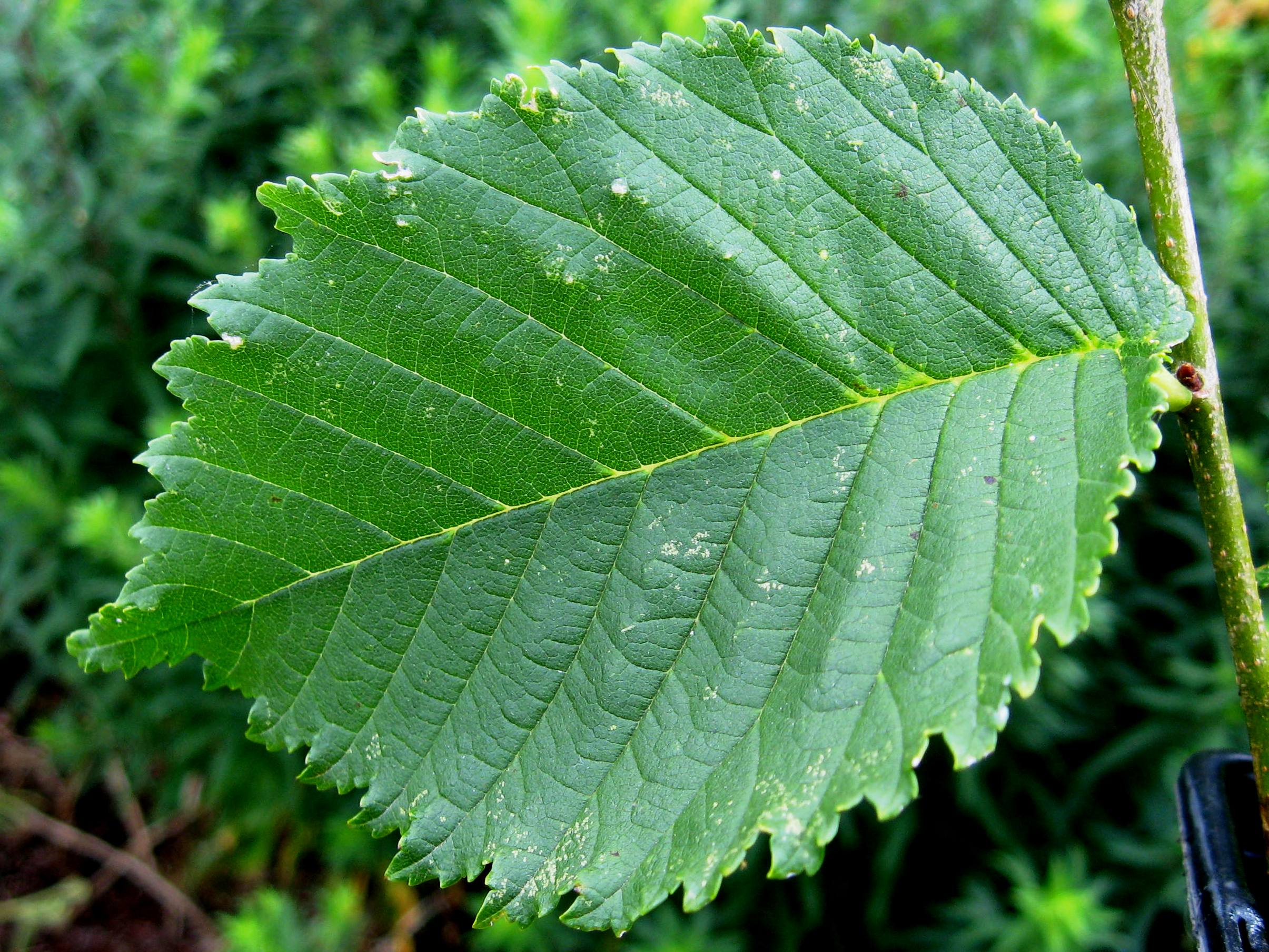
Lutèce leaf in August

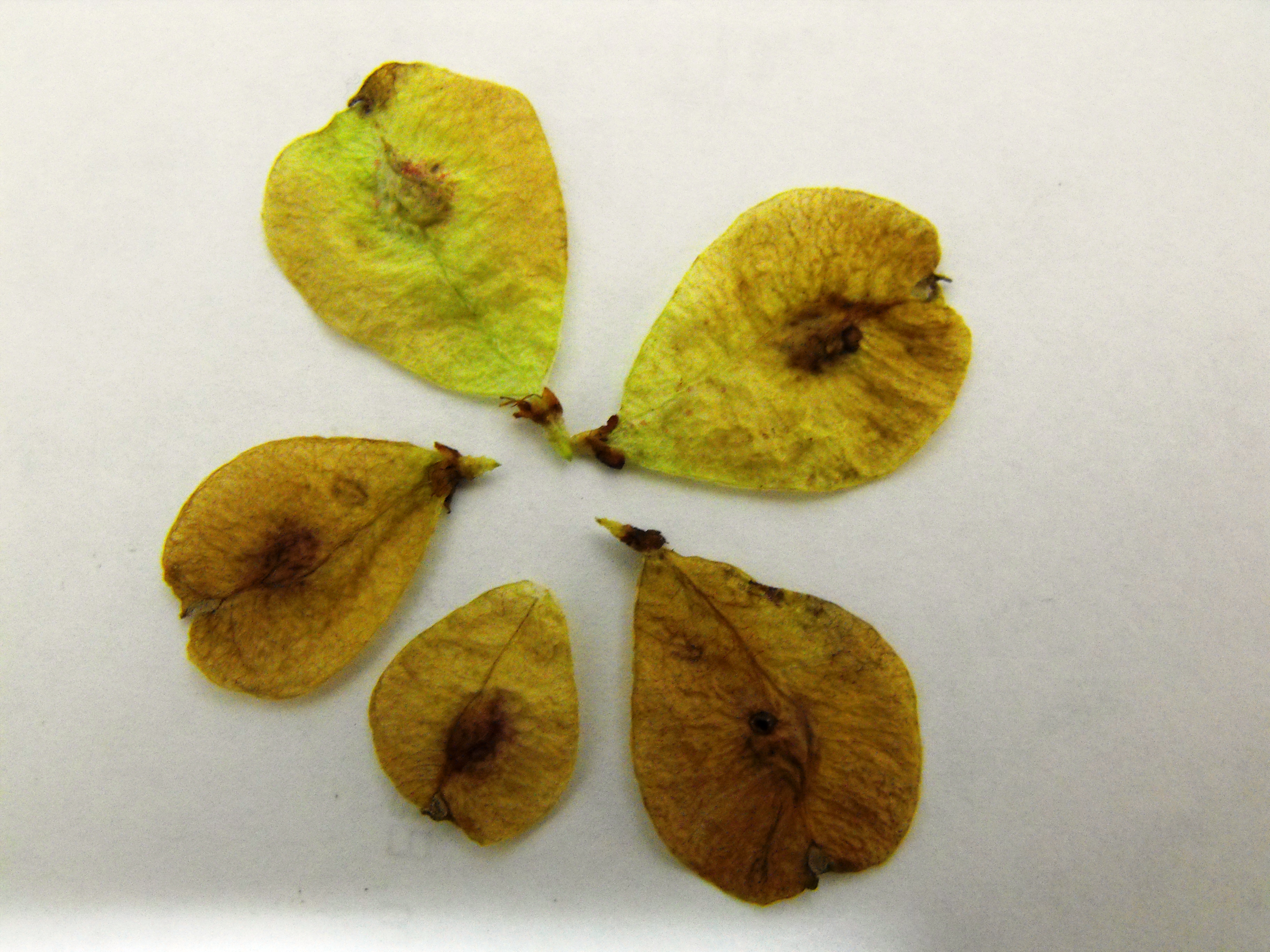
Lutèce samarae

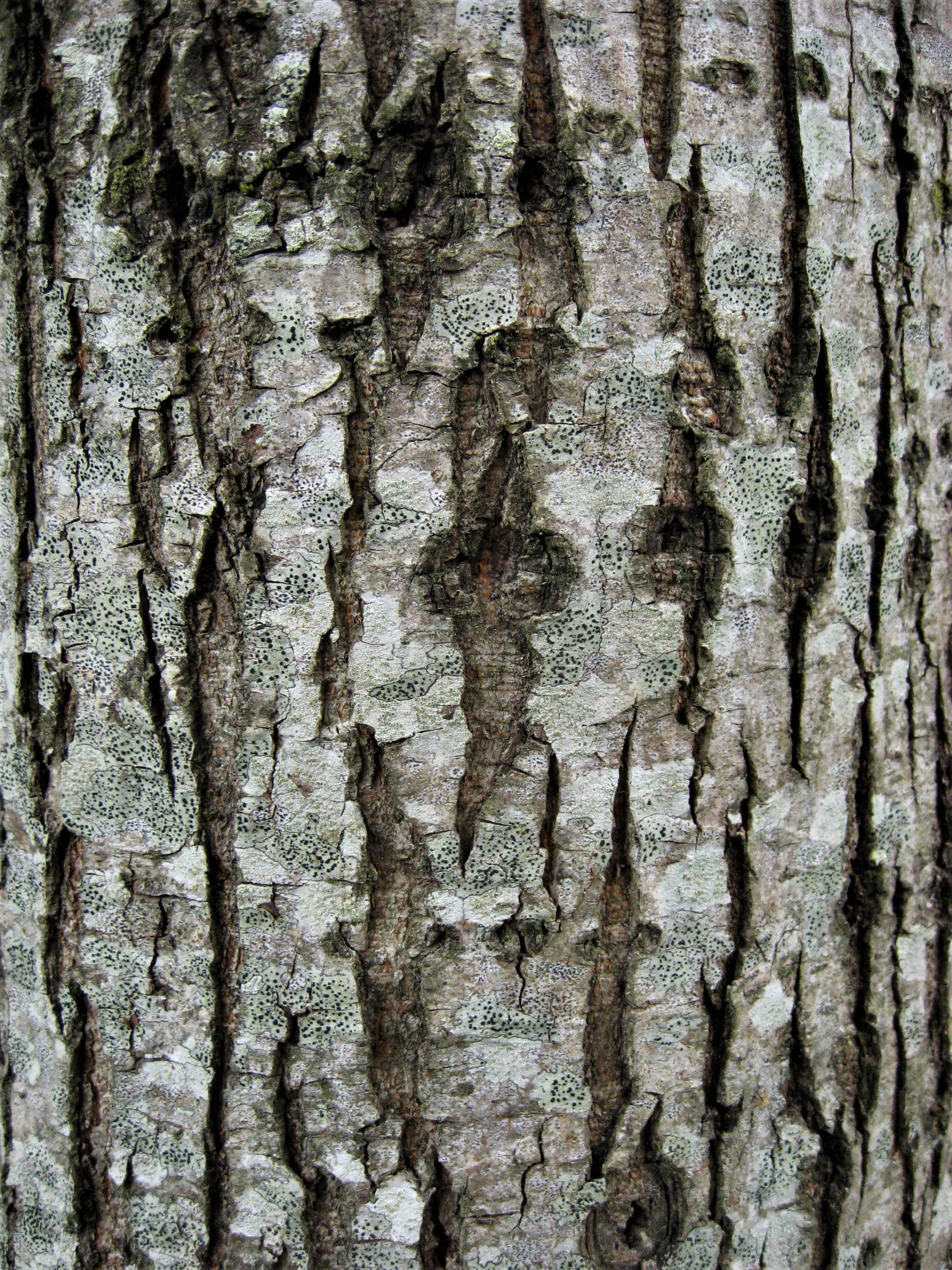
Bark of 22-year-old tree

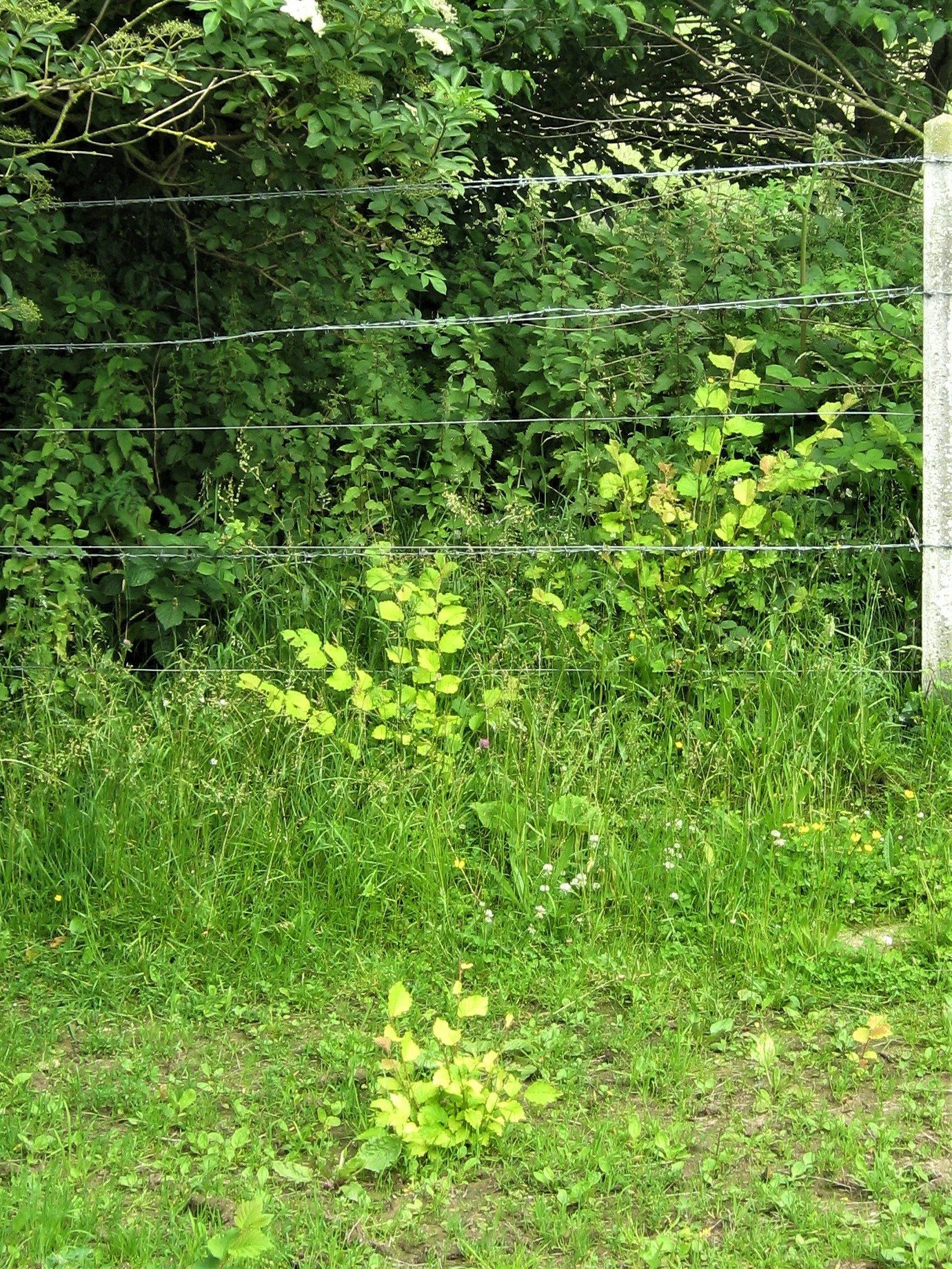
Lutèce root suckering, Ports Down, UK

== Pests and diseases ==
Lutèce exhibited a high resistance to Dutch elm disease when inoculated with unnaturally high doses of the causal fungus Ophiostoma novo-ulmi, and was rated 5 out of 5 in Dutch tests. Tests in France by INRA confirmed the tree as 'highly resistant'. Used as a control in IRSTEA's trials of French Ulmus minor clones, it was noted that not one specimen succumbed to natural infection by DED.

== Cultivation ==
The cultivar is now being widely planted in cities, notably Paris, and rural areas of France. Sales in France rose to almost 30,000 per annum in 2022.

Lutèce was introduced to the UK by the Hampshire & Isle of Wight Branch, Butterfly Conservation, in 2001, as part of its assessment of DED-resistant cultivars as potential hosts of the endangered White-letter Hairstreak. The plants were donated by SAPHO (Syndicate for the improvement of ornamental horticultural plants) ahead of its release to commerce. In trials in southern England, the tree has proven very hardy, tolerant of sea winds, summer droughts, and ground waterlogged during winter. Lutèce is cold hardy, and has survived winter temperatures as low as −30° C in Sweden. Two lines of ten Lutèce stand at Wrest Park, Bedfordshire. Among urban introductions in the UK are three specimens, planted in 2014, at the west end of Broad Walk, Christ Church Meadow, Oxford, and three in Princes Street Gardens, Edinburgh.

Specimens of the cultivar have been planted in the Netherlands, notably among the line of 140 elms on the ‘s-Gravelandsevaartweg, Loosdrecht (ten trees near the northern end, south of the 'Columella', planted 2014), part of Wijdemeren City Council's elm collection, assembled since 2003 by tree manager Martin Tijdgat and his colleagues.

Lutèce was introduced to North America in 2010, with the supply of two small specimens to the USDA, Washington, D.C., released from quarantine in 2013. Lutèce is not known to have been introduced to Australasia.

Increasing Lutèce by softwood cuttings is relatively straightforward, however these lose their viability as the donor trees mature. Several French nurseries resorted to grafting onto 'Sapporo Autumn Gold' rootstocks, but this practice ended in 2022.

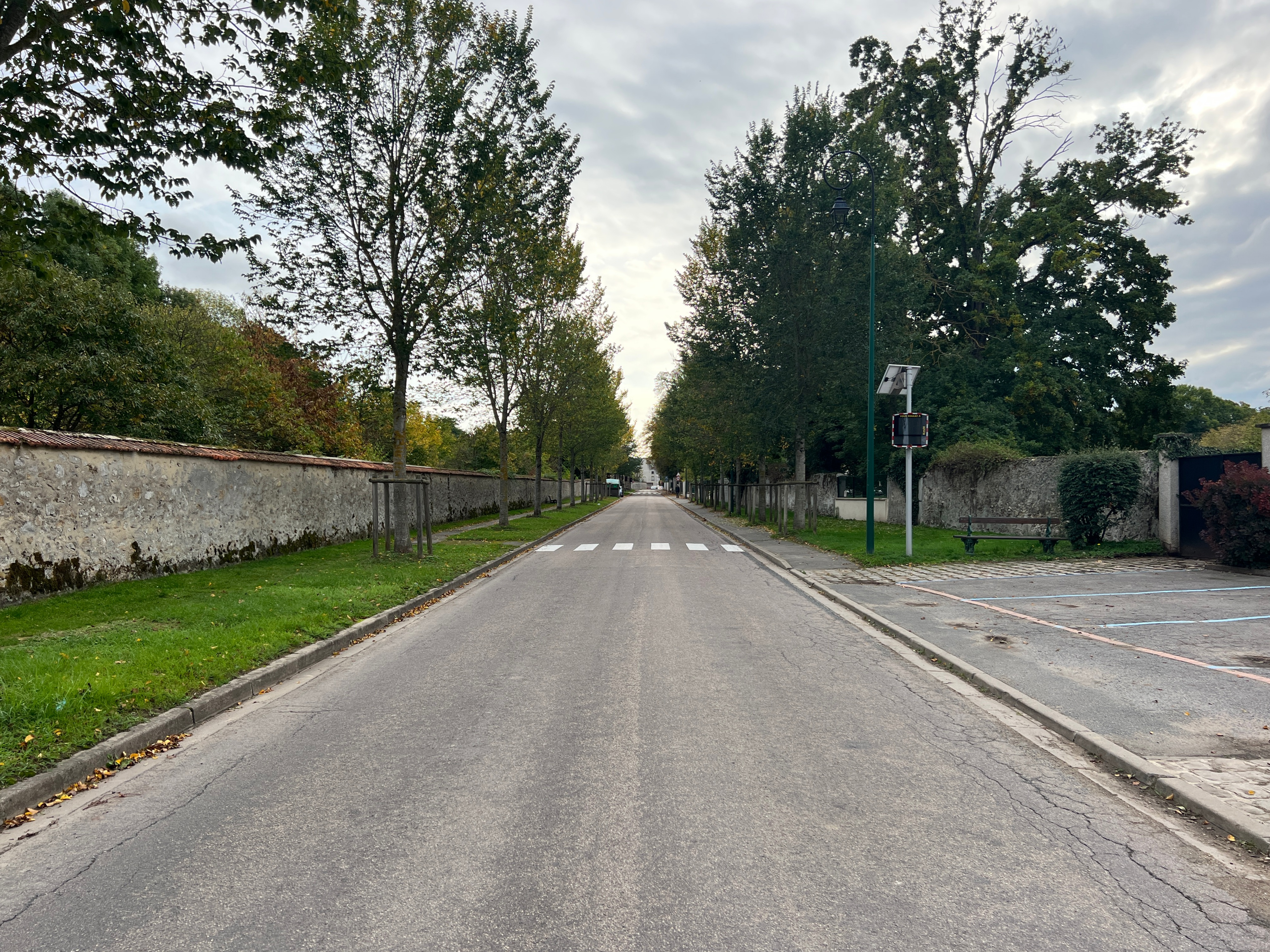
Twenty-two Lutèce, Rue Général Léry, Annet-sur-Marne (2022), planted 2012

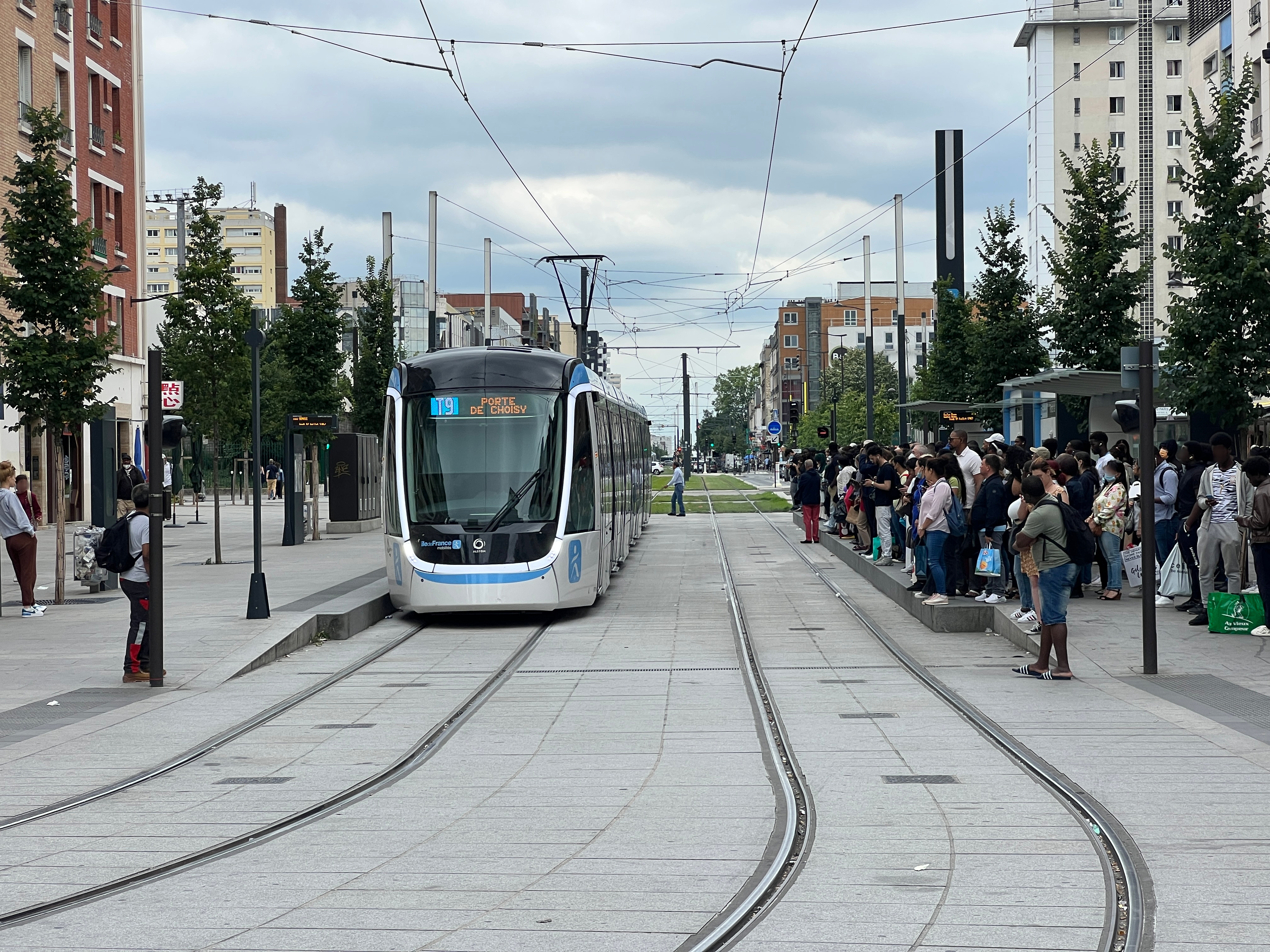
Lutèce, Tramway T9 stop, Porte de Choisy station, Paris (2022)

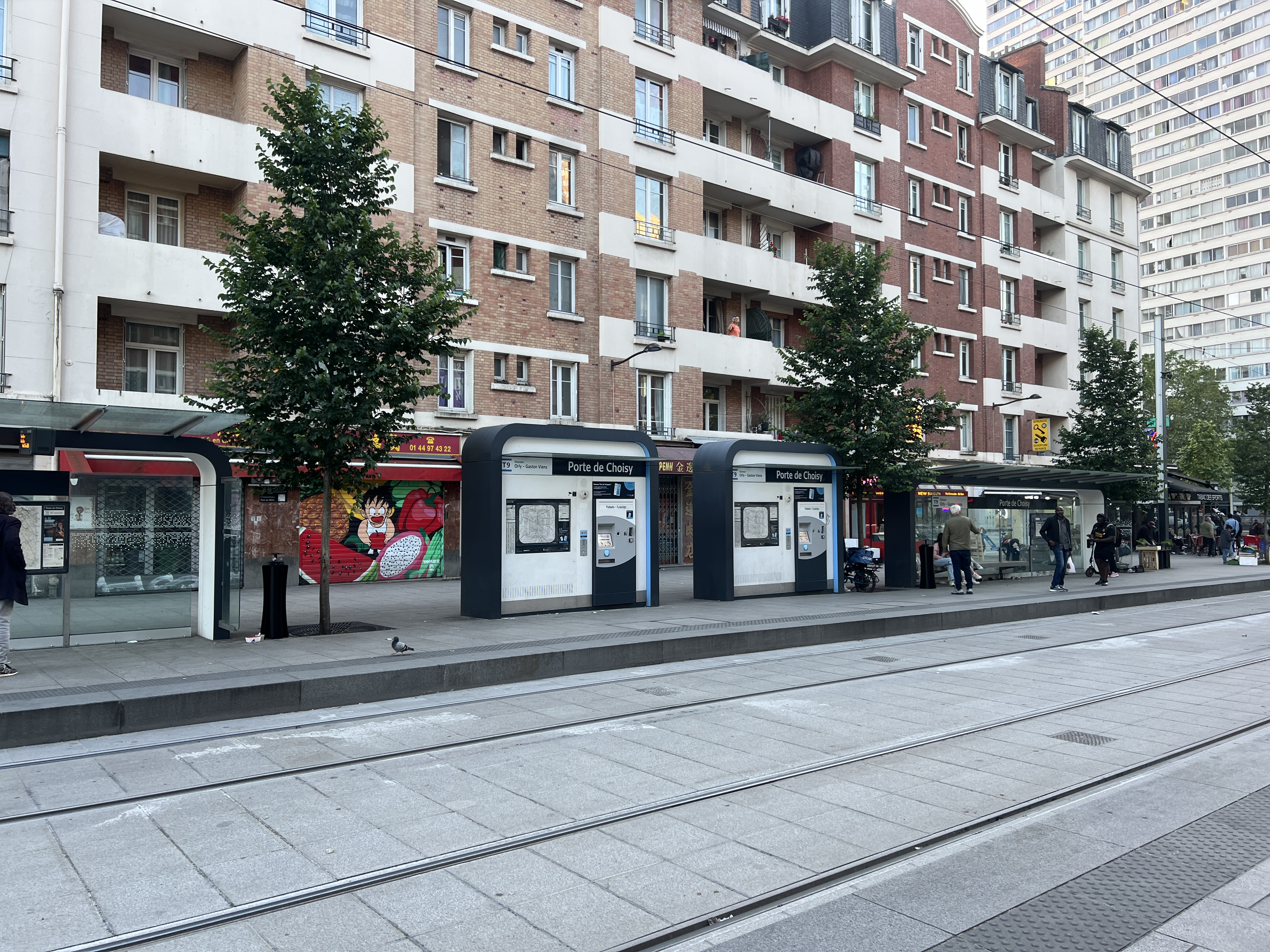
Lutèce, Tramway T9 stop, Porte de Choisy station (2024)

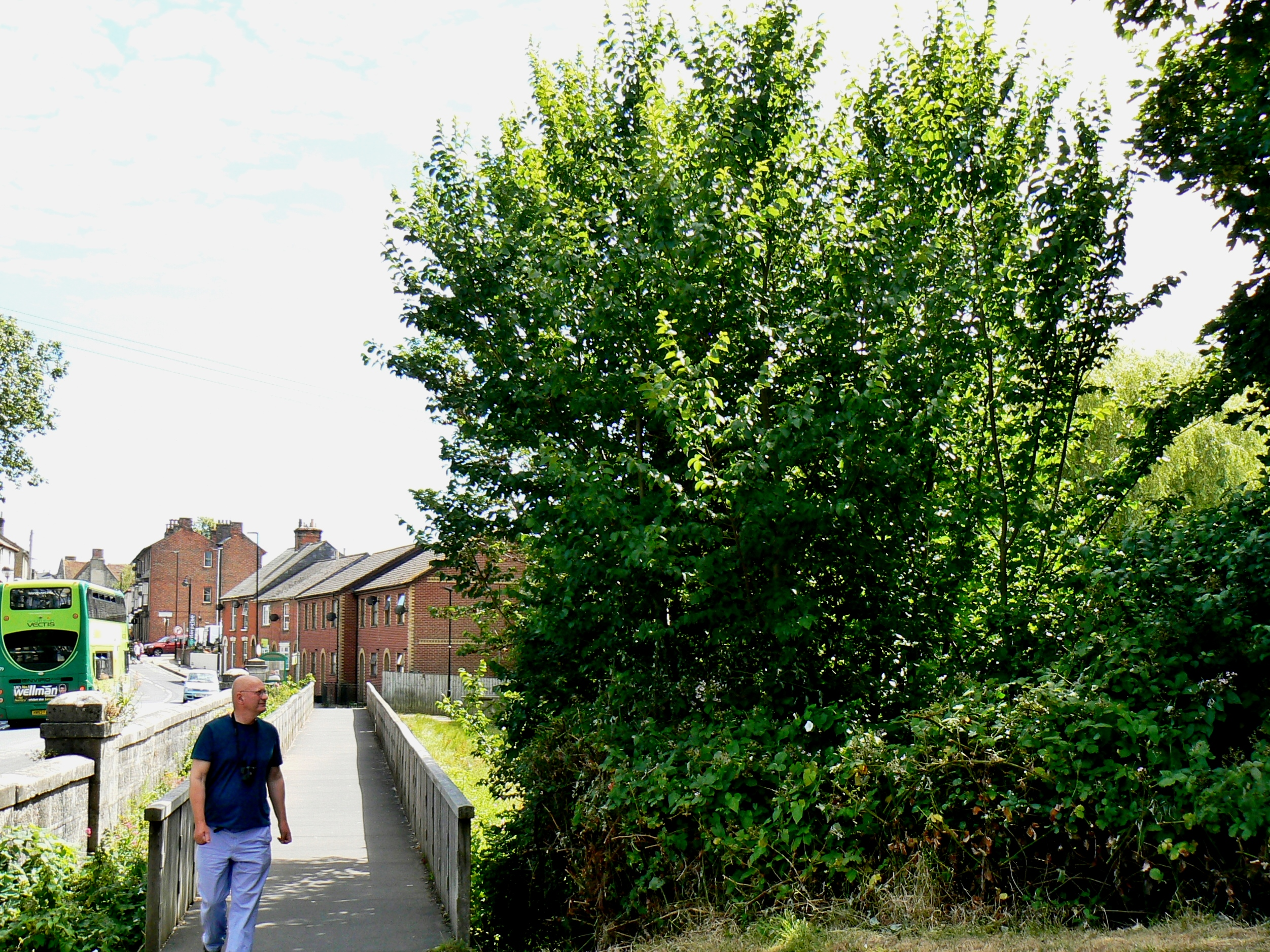
Lutèce, Isle of Wight, hosting White-letter Hairstreak

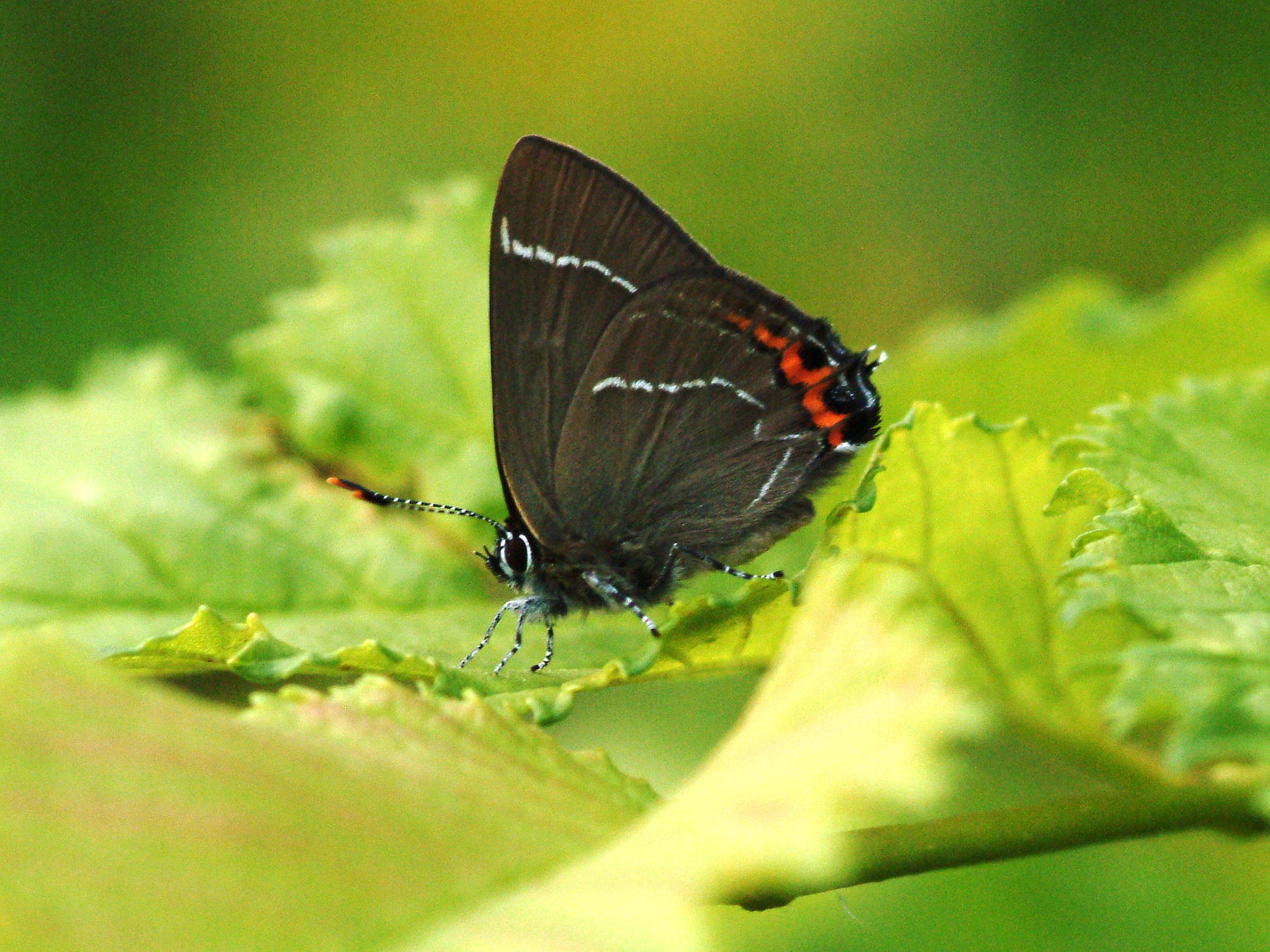
White-letter Hairstreak on Lutèce, Sweden

=== Natural hybridization ===
The flowering period of Lutèce coincides in part with that of field elm, and the seeds harvested have produced viable seedlings, though possibly selfed.

=== Conservation role ===
3,500 Lutèce were planted on the Isle of Wight by Natural Enterprise, and in smaller numbers in Hampshire by Butterfly Conservation and the Forestry Commission, in the hope the tree would host the white-letter hairstreak butterfly (Satyrium w-album), a monophagic species which remains in serious decline as a consequence of Dutch elm disease. This was confirmed in 2015 with the discovery of the butterfly breeding on specimens planted in 2003 at Towngate, Newport, Isle of Wight (see photo 5 in Gallery) and at Great Fontley in 2021 .

== Etymology ==
The registered cultivar name 'Nanguen' is a contraction of Nancy and Wagueningen, the locations of the French and Dutch research institutes. The selling name Lutèce is the French derivation of Lutetia, the ancient Roman name for the settlement which later became Paris. The name was adopted in recognition of the trials of the cultivar conducted by INRA in the Bois de Vincennes.

== Accessions ==
=== Europe ===
- Brighton & Hove City Council, UK. NCCPG Elm Collection. Stanmer Nursery.
- Grange Farm Arboretum, Sutton St James, Spalding, Lincolnshire, UK. Acc. no. not known.
- Great Fontley Farm, Fareham, UK. Butterfly Conservation Elm Trials plantation, Home Field and the Platt, five small whips donated by SAPHO in 2002.
- Longstock Park Leckford Estate, Hampshire | Farm Produce | The Waitrose Farm Arboretum, UK. One juvenile specimen planted 2010.
- Royal Botanic Garden Edinburgh, UK. Acc. no. 20042084
- Sir Harold Hillier Gardens, UK. Acc. no. 2004.0515

=== North America ===
- National Arboretum, Washington, D.C., US. Two small trees imported in 2010.

== Nurseries ==
Europe

- Batouwe Boomkwekerijen B.V. Batouwe boomkwekerijen BV, Dodewaard, Netherlands. Potted whips.
- Boomkwekerij Ebben, Cuijk, Netherlands.
- F P Matthews 'Trees for Life' Ulmus LUTECE ('Nanguen'), Tenbury Wells, Worcestershire, UK. Potted trees, not grafted, propagated under licence.
- Les Pépiniéres Minier (UK: gbsales@minier-nurseries.fr), Beaufort-en-Vallée, France. Bare-rooted whips, minimum export value: €500.
- Van Den Berk (UK) Ltd., Discover our wide range of trees and shrubs - Van den Berk Nurseries, London, UK

== Pictures ==
Photographs of the Isle of Wight's Island 2000 Trust planting Lutece elms can be seen at the Flickr website here at Special Elm Trees and New Elms being planted out..
