= Ulmus minor 'Bea Schwarz' =

Elm cultivar

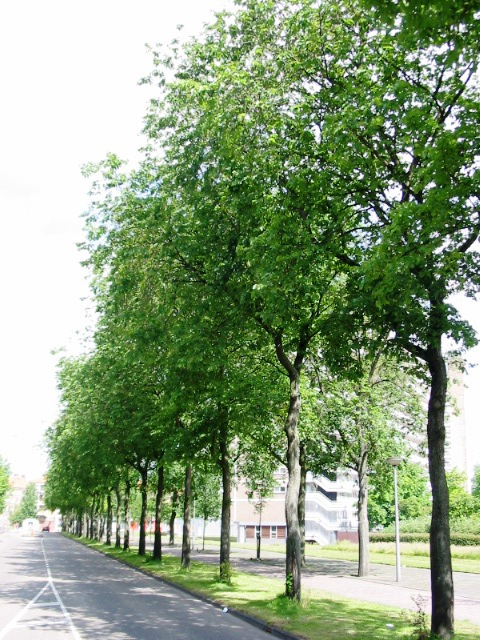
- 'Bea Schwarz', Amsterdam.
- Cultivar: 'Bea Schwarz'
- Origin: Netherlands

The elm cultivar Ulmus minor 'Bea Schwarz' was cloned (as No. 62) at Wageningen in the Netherlands, by the elm disease committee, from a selection of Ulmus minor found in France in 1939. Specimens of the tree grown in the UK and the United States are sometimes incorrectly listed as Ulmus × hollandica (after Fontaine).

== Description ==
The leaves are ovoid to oval (6 to 10 cm), emerging more or less purple-red; the underside is pillose. The tree is considered of poor growth and shape if grafted on U. × hollandica rootstock. Nowadays it is sparsely grown on its own rootstock.

== Pests and diseases ==
Not resistant to the second, more virulent, strain of Dutch elm disease, (O. novo-ulmi), but more resistant to Coral Spot fungus Nectria cinnabarina than its forebear 'Christine Buisman'.

== Cultivation ==
Commercial production was discontinued in the Netherlands soon after its release in 1948. Nevertheless, its moderate resistance to Dutch elm disease saw it, or its selfed progeny, successfully used in later Dutch hybridizations, notably 'Nanguen' = Lutèce. 'Bea Schwarz' was later propagated and marketed in the UK by the Hillier & Sons nursery, Winchester, Hampshire from 1967 to 1977, when production ceased with the advent of the more virulent form of Dutch elm disease. A specimen was planted on its own rootstock in Dennenlaan, Loosdrecht (2019), as part of Wijdemeren City Council's elm collection.

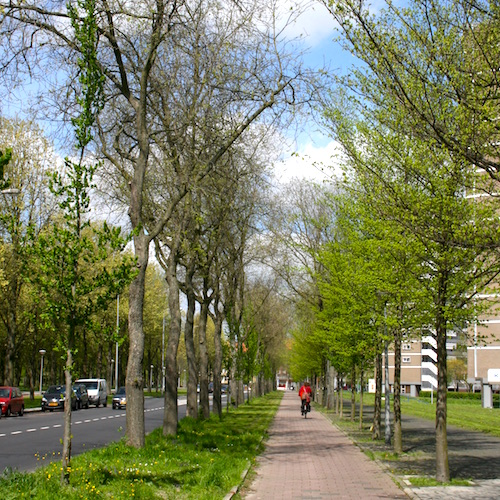
'Bea Schwarz' (left). Noordzijde, Sloterplas, Amsterdam, 2012.

== Notable trees ==
The largest known examples in the UK grow along Crespin Way, Hollingdean, Brighton; planted in 1964, they measured 19 m high by 50 cm d.b.h. in 2009.

== Hybrid cultivars ==
- 'Nanguen' = Lutèce, 'Clusius', 'Lobel', (all from crossings with clone '336', 'Bea Schwarz' selfed), Ulmus 'Amsterdam' (possibly from an open pollination of 'Bea Schwarz' and sometimes called Ulmus minor 'Amsterdam' in the Netherlands).

== Etymology ==
The tree is named for Bea Schwarz, the Dutch phytopathologist who identified the Asian microfungus known as Ophiostoma ulmi, one of the causative agents of Dutch elm disease, in the 1920s.

== Accessions ==
=== North America ===
- Arnold Arboretum, US. Acc. nos. 151–61, 276–62
- Holden Arboretum, US. Acc. no. 57–1243
- Longwood Gardens, US. Acc. no. 1967–0876

=== Europe ===
- Brighton & Hove City Council, UK. NCCPG Elm Collection.
- Grange Farm Arboretum, Lincolnshire, UK. Acc. no. 1275

== Nurseries ==
=== Europe ===
- Noordplant , Glimmen, Netherlands.
