= Lobe (surname) =

Lobe is a surname of German origin. Notable people with the surname include:

- Bill Lobe (1912–1969), American baseball player and coach
- Jim Lobe (born 1949), American journalist
- Kārlis Lobe (1895–1985), Latvian collaborationist with the Nazis
- Mira Lobe (1913–1995), Austrian author
- Robert Lawrance Lobe (born 1945), American sculptor
