= Arboretum de la Petite Loiterie =

Arboretum in Centre-Val de Loire, France

Coordinates: 47.65°N 0.837°E

The Arboretum de la Petite Loiterie (16 hectares) is a young arboretum located in Le Sentier, Monthodon, Indre-et-Loire, Centre-Val de Loire, France. It is open a few days per month; an admission fee is charged.

The arboretum was conceived in 1980 with its first trees planted in 1995; it opened to the public in 2003 and active planting continues. It is unusual in conception and layout, as it focuses on trees and bushes that can readily be found in commercial nurseries (rather than rare species), and it organizes specimens to collocate species with similar leaves, thus highlighting their similarities and differences.

Today the arboretum contains more than 2,000 species and cultivars of woody plants, planted within a site that also contains 3.5 hectares of meadow, 4 hectares of woods, wetlands, and a pond (3800 m²). Of particular interest are the arboretum's 2 kilometers of hedges, composed of a variety of species.

== See also ==
- List of botanical gardens in France
