= Monthodon =

- Commune
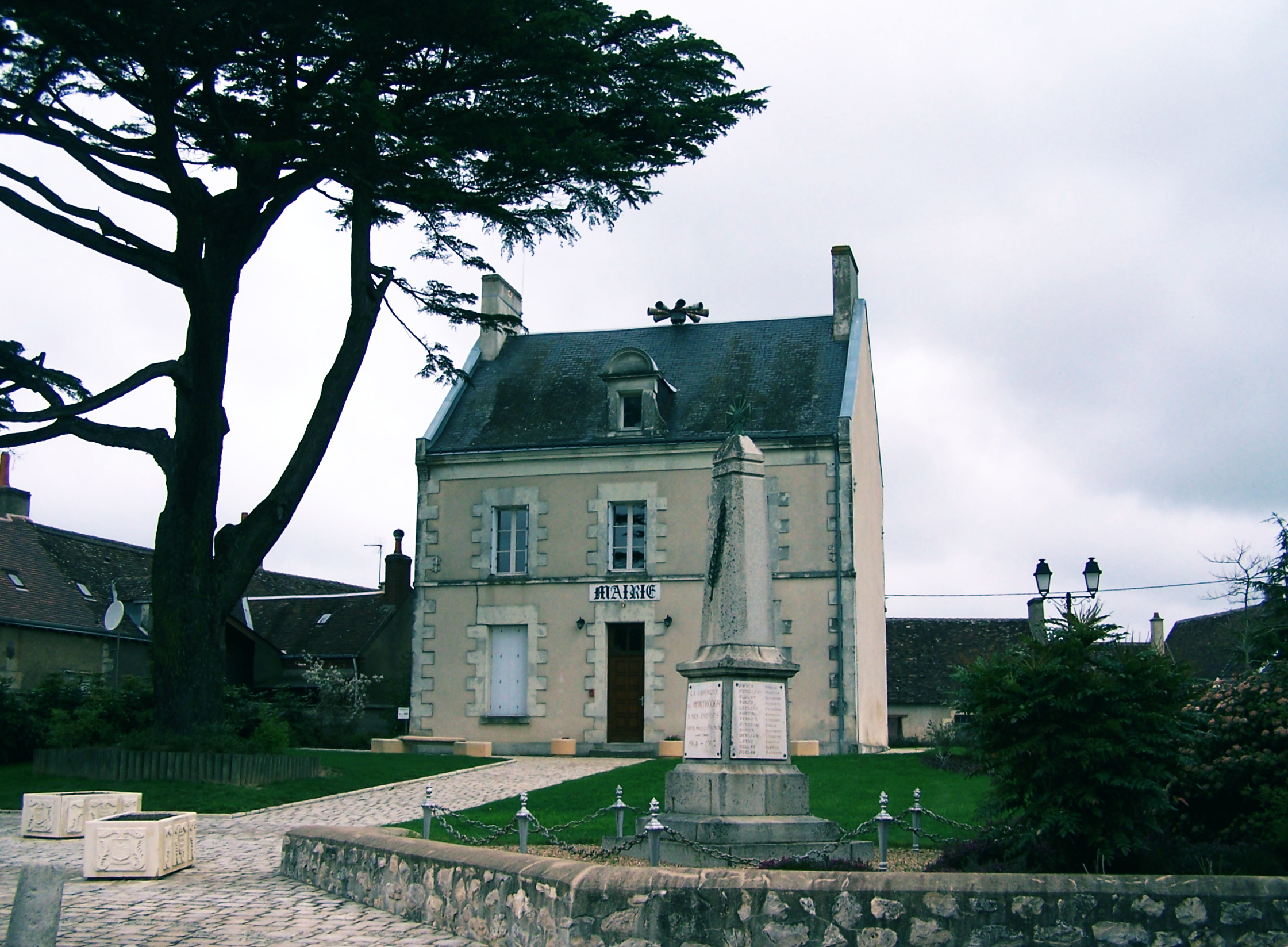
- The town hall in Monthodon
- Location of Monthodon
- Location within France Location within Centre-Val de Loire
- Coordinates: 47°39′02″N 0°50′14″E
- Country: France
- Region: Centre-Val de Loire
- Department: Indre-et-Loire
- Arrondissement: Loches
- Canton: Château-Renault

Government
  - Mayor (2022–2026): Frédéric Laugis
- Area^{1}: 33.91 km^{2} (13.09 sq mi)
- Highest elevation: 172 m (564 ft)
- Lowest elevation: 115 m (377 ft)
- Population (2023): 643
  - Density: 19.0/km^{2} (49.1/sq mi)
- Time zone: UTC+01:00 (CET)
  - Summer (DST): UTC+02:00 (CEST)
- INSEE/Postal code: 37155 /37110
- ^{1} French Land Register data, which excludes lakes, ponds, glaciers > 1 km^{2} (0.386 sq mi or 247 acres) and river estuaries.

Monthodon (French pronunciation: [mɔ̃tɔdɔ̃]) is a commune in the Indre-et-Loire department in central France.

== Population ==
Historical population
Year	Pop.	±% p.a.
1968	673	—
1975	579	−2.13%
1982	560	−0.48%
1990	547	−0.29%
1999	559	+0.24%
2007	630	+1.51%
2012	608	−0.71%
2017	631	+0.75%
2023	643	+0.31%
Source: INSEE

== Sights ==
- Arboretum de la Petite Loiterie

== See also ==
- Communes of the Indre-et-Loire department
