= Sutton St James =

Village and civil parish in the South Holland district of Lincolnshire, England

Coordinates: 52.744612°N 0.067388°E

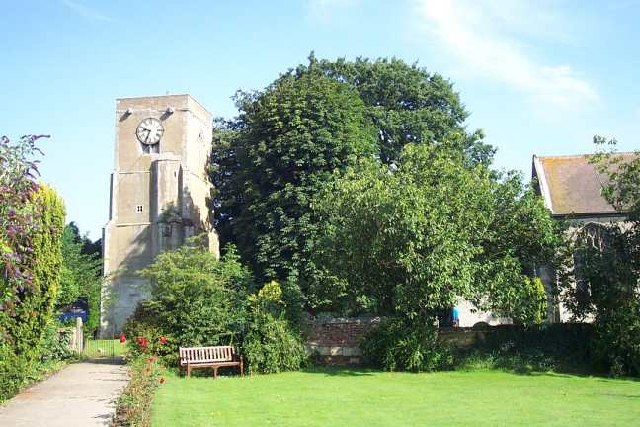
- Sutton St James' church tower and chancel

- Location within Lincolnshire
- Population: 1,118 (2011)
- OS grid reference: TF396183
  - London: 100 mi (160 km) S
- District: South Holland
- Shire county: Lincolnshire
- Region: East Midlands
- Country: England
- Sovereign state: United Kingdom
- Post town: SPALDING
- Postcode district: PE12
- Police: Lincolnshire
- Fire: Lincolnshire
- Ambulance: East Midlands
- UK Parliament: South Holland and The Deepings

Sutton St James is a village and civil parish in the South Holland district of Lincolnshire, England, about four miles (6.4 km) south-west of Long Sutton.

Lying in the Lincolnshire Fens, Sutton St James did not exist at the time of the 1086 Domesday Book. Sutton St James was a chapelry to the parish of Long Sutton until it was created a civil parish in 1866.

The parish church is dedicated to Saint James, and is unusual in that the chancel and tower are disconnected, the nave having been destroyed during the Interregnum, when Oliver Cromwell was Lord Protector of England. The tower is Grade II* listed and dates from the 15th century, with restorations in 1879 and 1894. The chancel is Grade II listed and dates from the 15th century – it was heavily restored at the same time as the tower, and an extension was added in the 20th century. The font bowl dates from the 15th century.

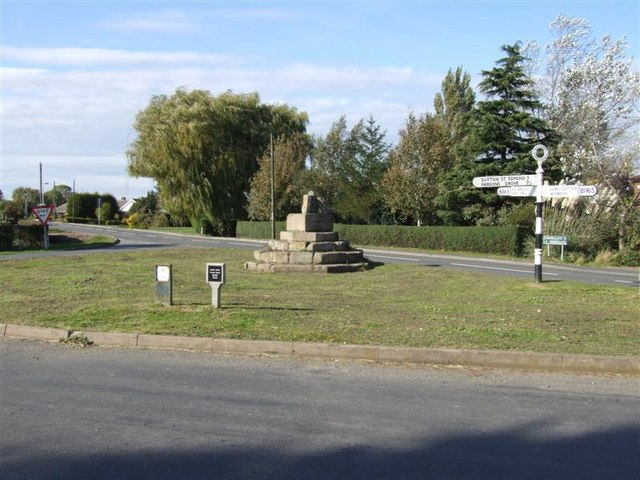
St Ives Cross

St Ives Cross is a 14th-century butter cross. All that now remains are four steps, the base and 12 inches (30 cm) of the shaft. It stands at the junction of four roads west of the village, and is a scheduled monument and Grade II listed.

Unusually for a small village, there is another cross located near Old Fen Dyke, which is believed to be a market cross, nearly 0.75 miles (1 km) south-west of St Ives Cross. Similarly, the base, and part of the shaft are all that survive. It is scheduled and Grade II listed. It is believed to be one of a rare group of medieval boundary markers of which only two other crosses survive.

Sutton St James has a butchers, a primary school, church hall, village hall, gun shop, hairdressers, public house, post office, shop, bowls club, football club, a small park, garage, a Baptist church and a playgroup.
