= Ulmus 'Columella' =

Elm cultivar

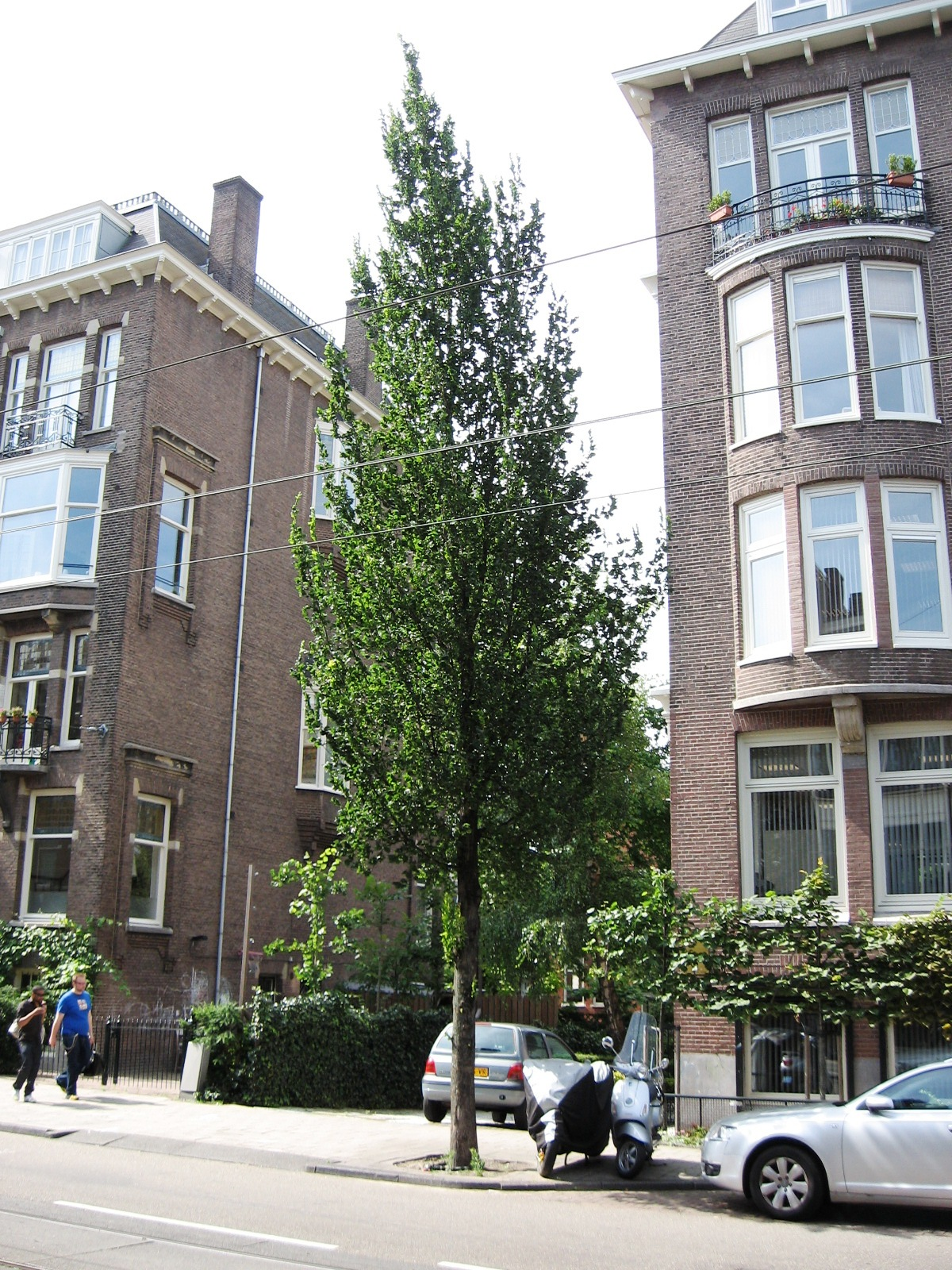
- 'Columella', Amsterdam.
- Genus: Ulmus
- Hybrid parentage: 'Plantyn' selfed or openly pollinated
- Cultivar: 'Columella'
- Origin: Wageningen, The Netherlands

Ulmus 'Columella' is a Dutch elm cultivar raised by the Dorschkamp Research Institute for Forestry & Landscape Planning, Wageningen. Originally thought to have been derived from a selfed or openly pollinated seedling of the hybrid clone 'Plantyn', DNA analysis later determined it arose from a cross of 'Plantyn' and Ulmus minor. Sown in 1967, it was released for sale in 1993 after proving extremely resistant to Dutch elm disease following injection with unnaturally high doses of the pathogen, Ophiostoma novo-ulmi. However, propagated by grafting onto wych elm rootstocks, graft failure owing to incompatibility became a common occurrence in the Netherlands, as with earlier clones such as 'Lobel' and the practice abandoned, all trees now raised on their own roots.

== Description ==
'Columella' makes a tall, fastigiate tree with very upright branches, but broadens in later years . The rough, rounded, and twisted leaves, < 7 cm (3 in) long, are the result of a recessive gene inherited from its Exeter elm ancestor, and are arranged in asymmetric clusters on short branchlets. The samarae, broadly obovate, are 13–17 mm (0.5–0.7 in) long by 10–12 mm wide.

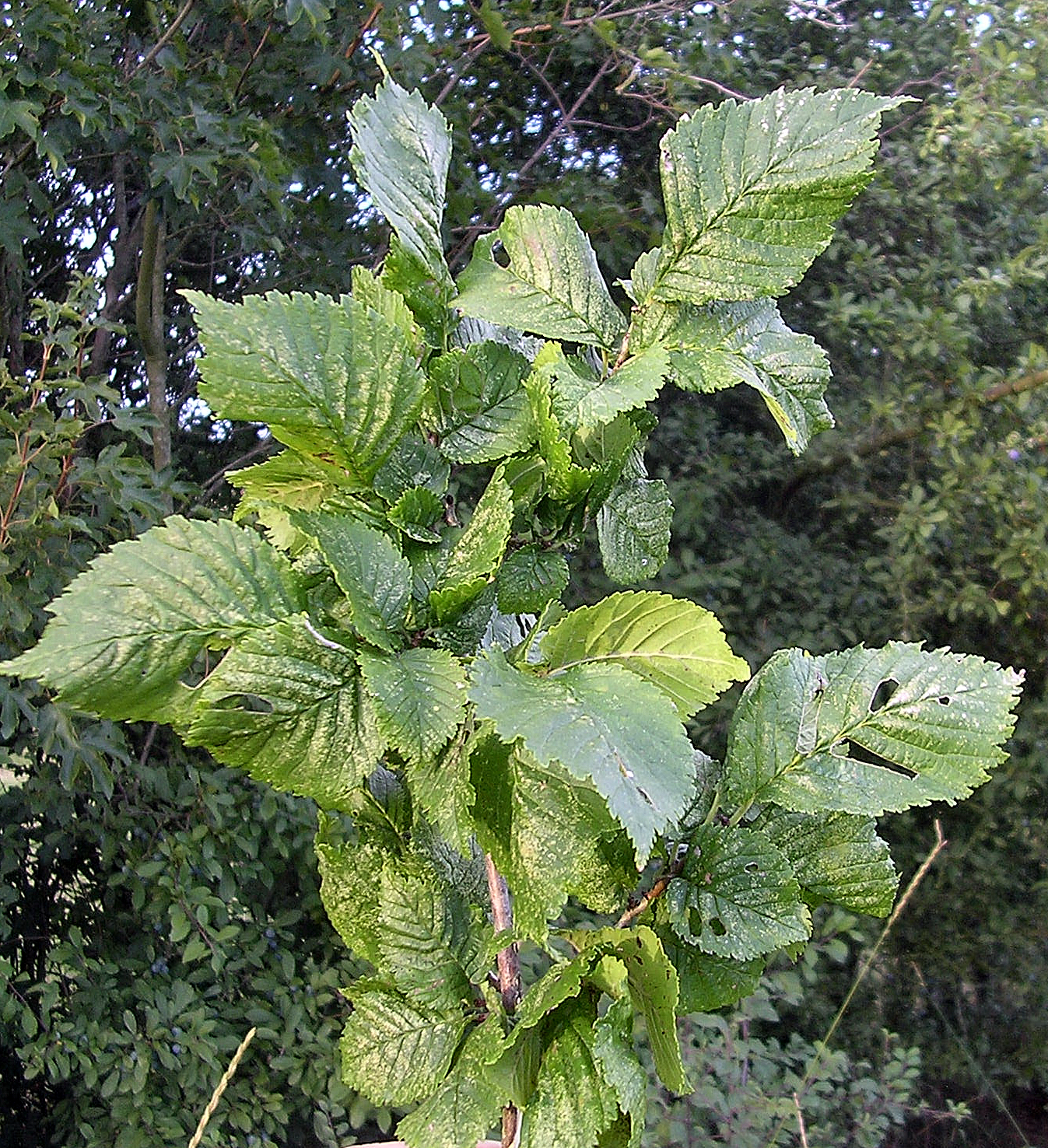

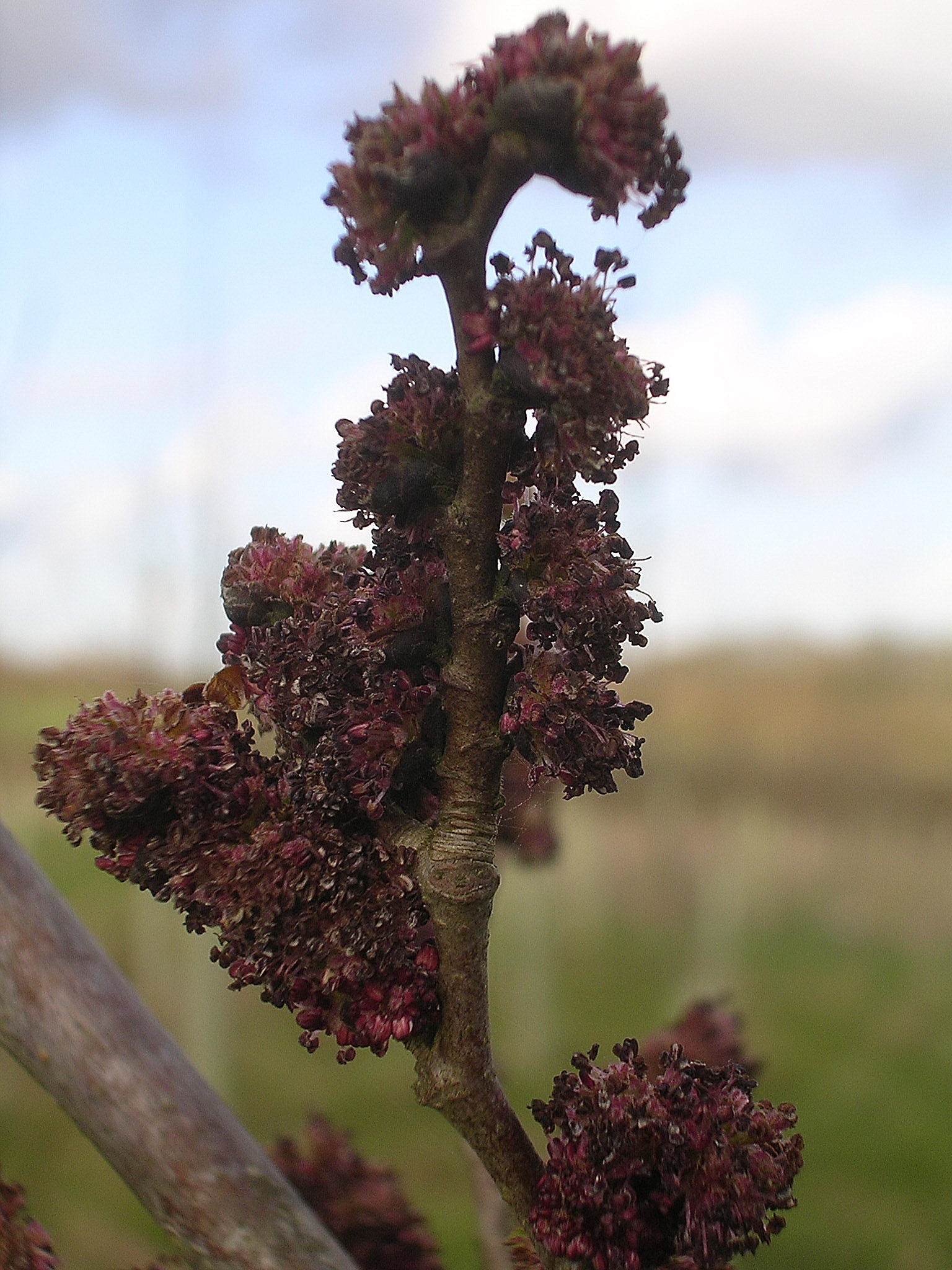

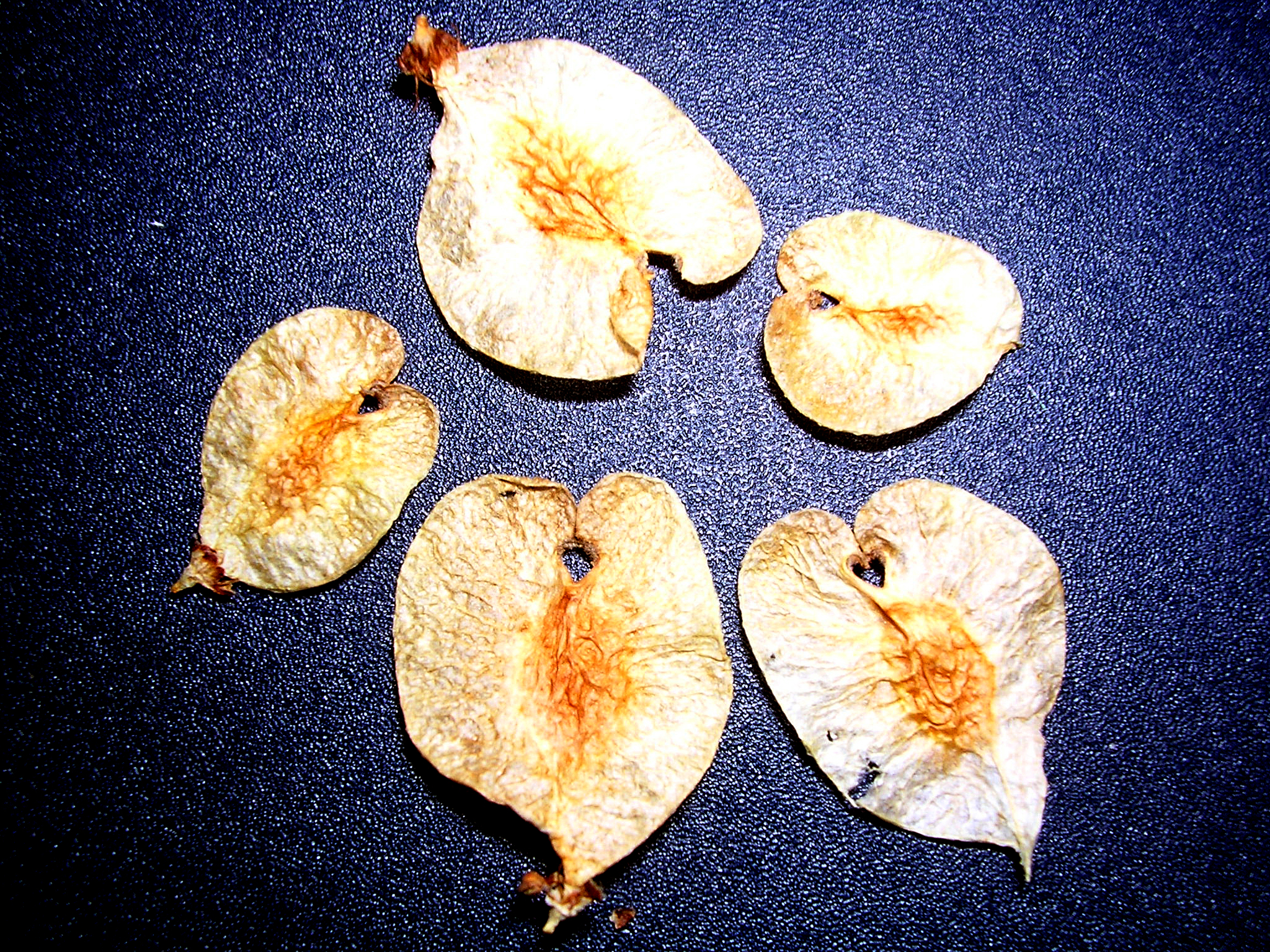

== Pests and diseases ==
Rated 5 out of 5, 'Columella' has a very high resistance to Dutch elm disease.

== Cultivation ==
Wind resistant, the tree has been planted throughout the Netherlands, where its columnar shape has made it popular as a street tree. It is commonly found in Amsterdam, where it has been widely planted as a replacement for the similarly fastigiate Guernsey Elm, U. minor 'Sarniensis' , itself a replacement for the Belgian Elm, Ulmus × hollandica 'Belgica', which had succumbed so readily to the earlier strain of Dutch elm disease after World War I. 'Columella' has also been planted to replace Guernsey Elm in Edinburgh.

In trials conducted by Butterfly Conservation in southern Hampshire, England, 'Columella' was the only cultivar to become distressed during the drought of 2006, shedding most of its foliage by early August; a trait possibly inherited from one of the tree's ancestors, the Himalayan elm Ulmus wallichiana. 'Columella' first flowered aged 8 years, in March; the resultant seeds were found to have a moderate viability. 'Columella' featured in New Zealand government trials during the 1990s at the Hortresearch station, Palmerston North.

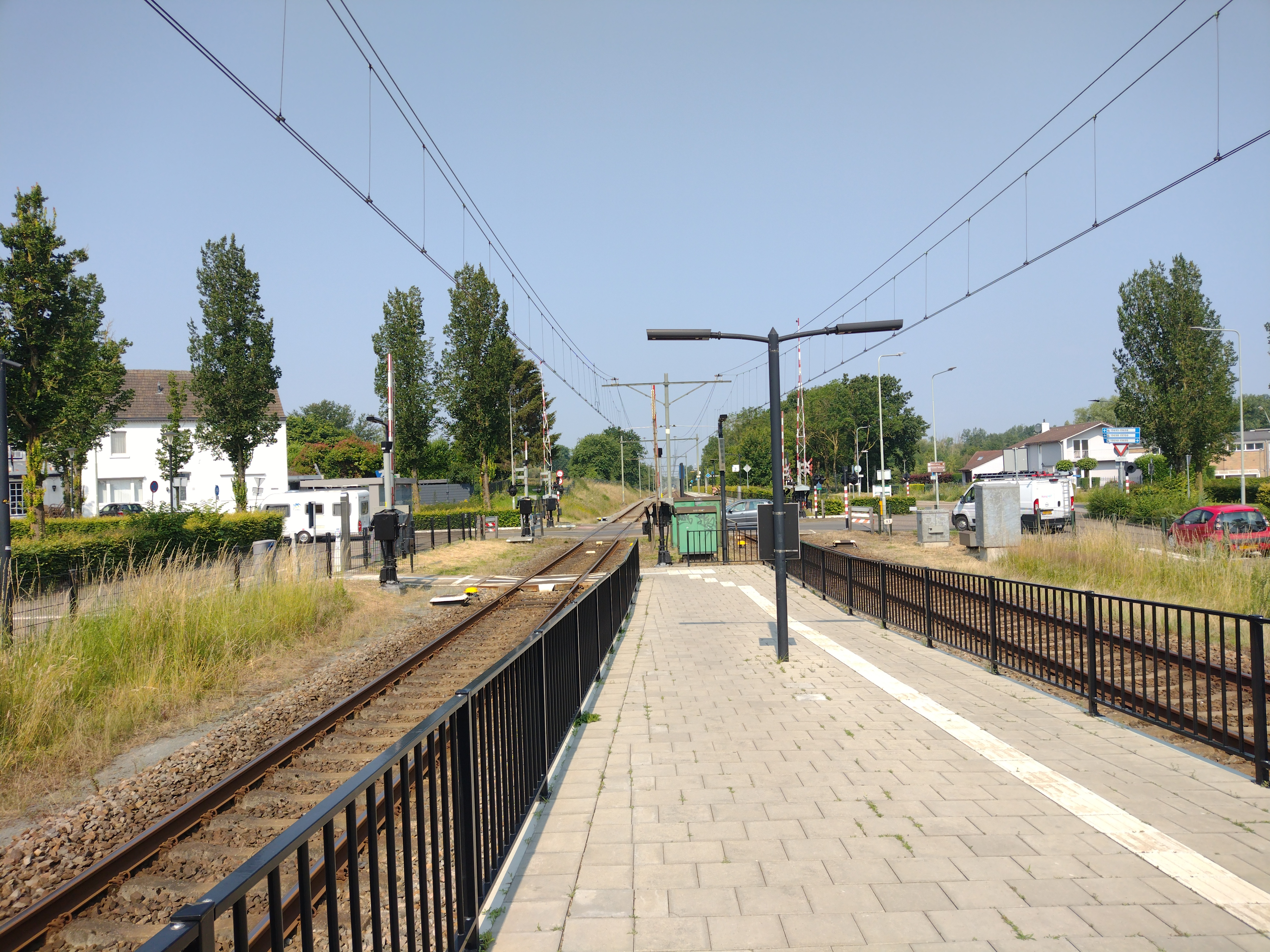
'Columella' at Schinnen railway station (2024)

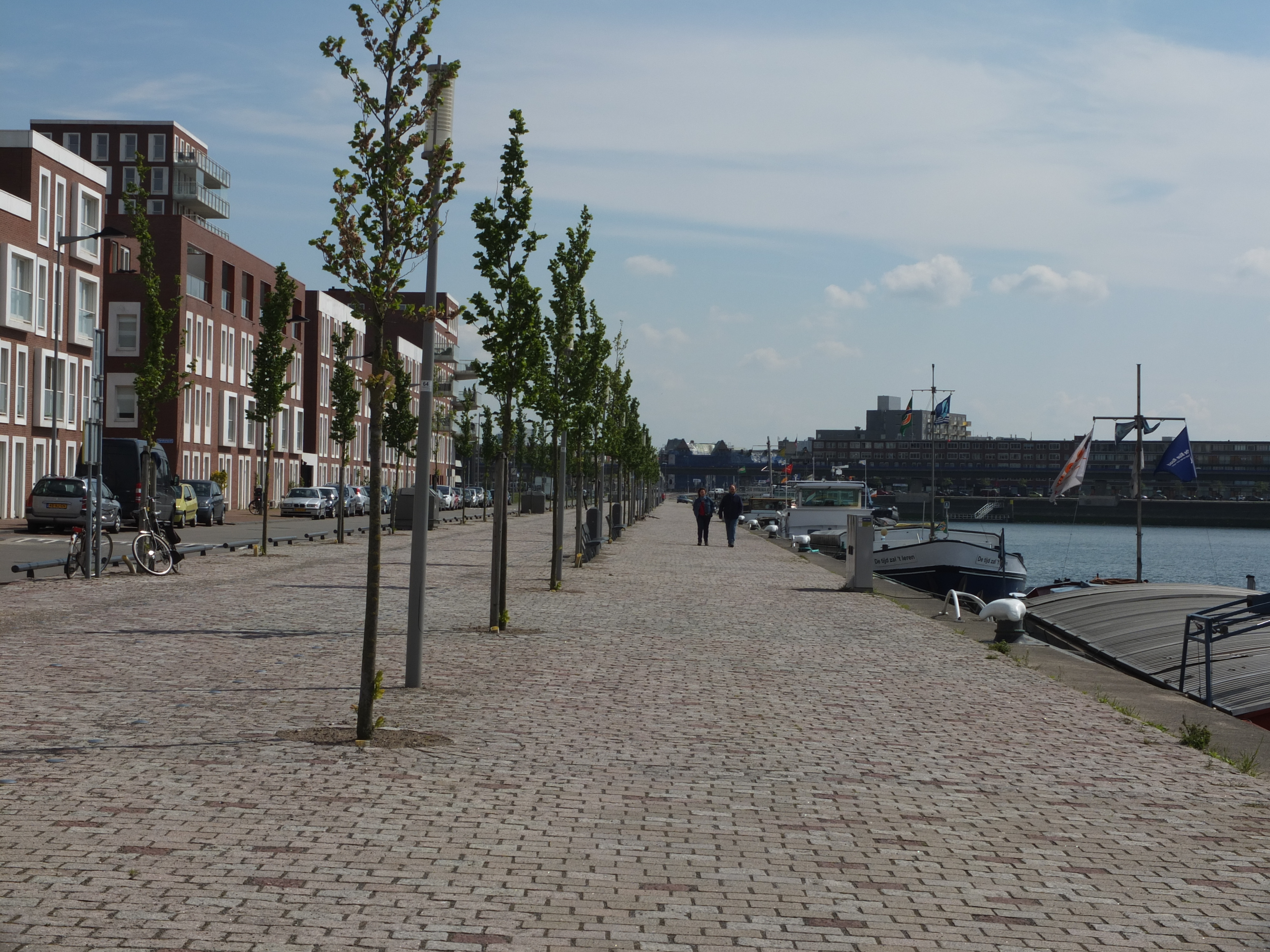
'Columella' in the Maashaven, Rotterdam (2015)

== Hybrid cultivars ==
- Clone FL 666 (Heybroek's 405* × 'Columella'), Istituto per la Protezione delle Piante, Florence. Not in commerce.
- Clone FL 589 ('San Zanobi' × 'Columella'), Istituto per la Protezione delle Piante, Florence. Not in commerce.

== Etymology ==
The hybrid is named for the Roman agronomist Columella, who introduced the Atinian elm (now more commonly known as the English elm) to Spain from Italy circa c. AD 50.

== Accessions ==
=== North America ===
- United States National Arboretum, Washington, D.C., US. Acc. no. Q28832 (quarantine)

=== Europe ===
- Arboretum de la Petite Loiterie , Monthodon, France. No details available.
- Brighton and Hove City Council, UK. Plant Heritage Elm Collection. East Drive, Queen's Park.
- Grange Farm Arboretum, Sutton St James, Spalding, Lincolnshire, UK. Acc. no. 818.
- Great Fontley, Fareham, UK. Butterfly Conservation Elm Trials plantation, planted 2003.
- Wijdemeren City Council, Netherlands. Elm Collection, first 3 planted ~1990 Loosdrecht.

== Nurseries ==
=== Europe ===
- Batouwe Boomkwekerijen B.V. , Dodewaard, Netherlands. Potted whips.
- Boomwekerijen 'De Batterijen', Ochten, Netherlands.
- Boomkwekerij Ebben, Cuijk, Netherlands.
- Boomkwekerij 't Herenland , Randwijk, Netherlands.
- Coles Nurseries, Thurnby, Leicester, UK.
- Hillier Nurseries , Ampfield, UK.
- Lorenz von Ehren, Hamburg, Germany.
- Paramount Plants & Gardens Ltd , Enfield, London, UK.
- PlantenTuin Esveld , Boskoop, Netherlands.
- UmbraFlor , Spello, Italy.
- Van Den Berk (UK) Ltd., , London, UK
- Westerveld Boomkwekerij B.V., Opheusden, Netherlands.
