= Ulmus 'Arno' =

Elm cultivar

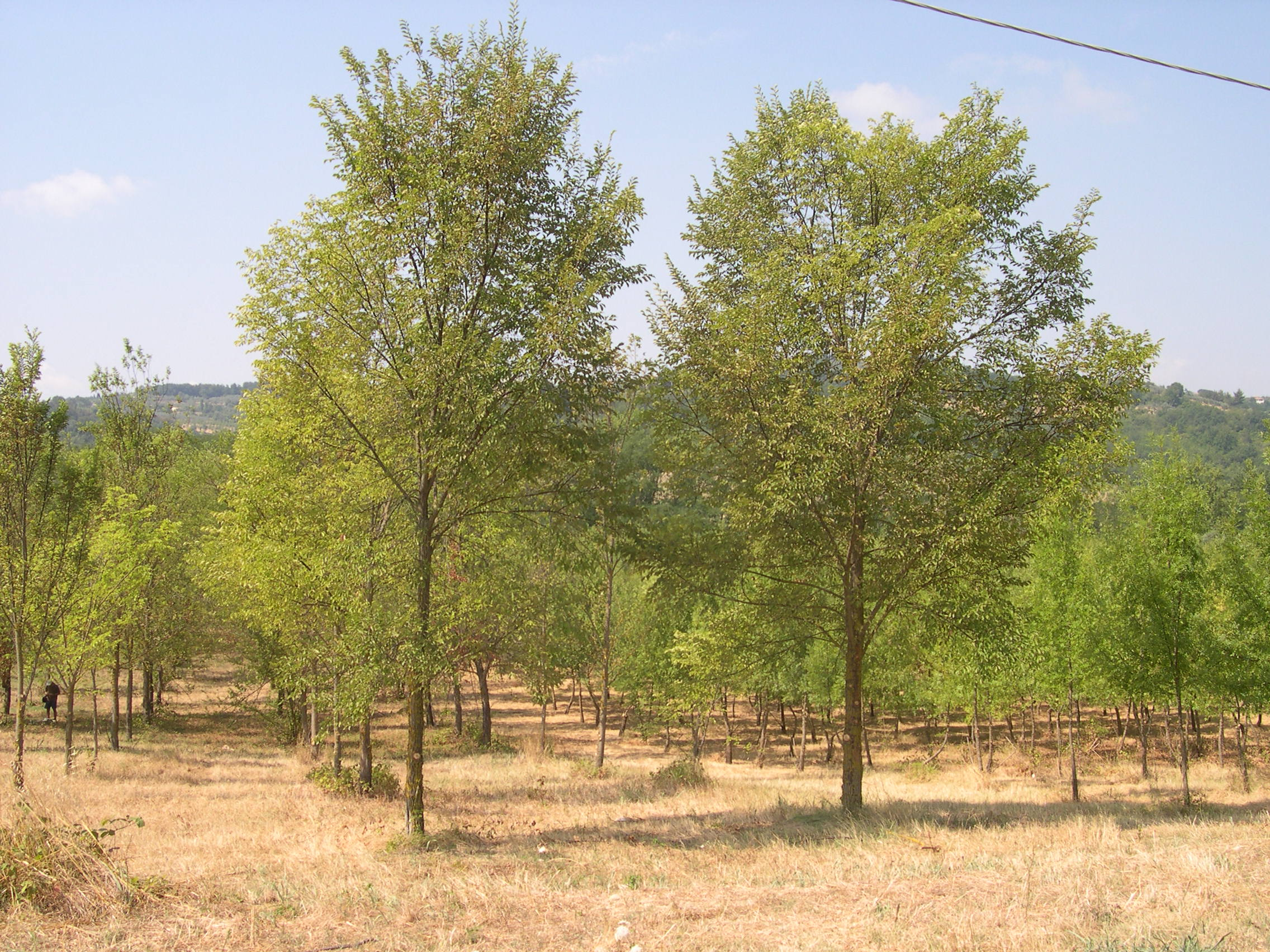
- 'Arno', Apennines, Italy.
- Genus: Ulmus
- Hybrid parentage: 'Plantyn' × Ulmus pumila S.2
- Cultivar: 'Arno'
- Origin: IPP, Florence

Ulmus 'Arno' is an Italian hybrid cultivar derived from a crossing of 'Plantyn' (female parent) with the Siberian Elm Ulmus pumila clone S.2. It was raised by the Istituto per la Protezione delle Piante (IPP) in Florence, and released in 2007. However, 'Arno' was not a commercial success; propagation had ceased by 2010, and it is no longer patent protected.

'Arno' was introduced to the UK in 2007 by Hampshire & Isle of Wight Branch, Butterfly Conservation, as part of an assessment of DED-resistant cultivars as potential hosts of the endangered White-letter Hairstreak.

== Description ==
'Arno' is of erect habit with upward main branches forming an oval to round crown. In Italy the tree is remarkably fast-growing, though not as fast as its contemporary 'Fiorente'. The trunk is straight, and usually forks at a height of 3 m; the bark is grey-green, with grey-orange fissures. The alternate deciduous leaves are of moderate size, < 9 cm long by < 5 cm wide, ovate to lanceolate, featuring yellowish - green undulate margins; they remain green throughout autumn and are usually shed relatively late. The perfect, apetalous wind-pollinated flowers appear in late February; the tree begins flowering at the age of five years in Italy. The sessile samarae are ovate, 14 × 17 mm.

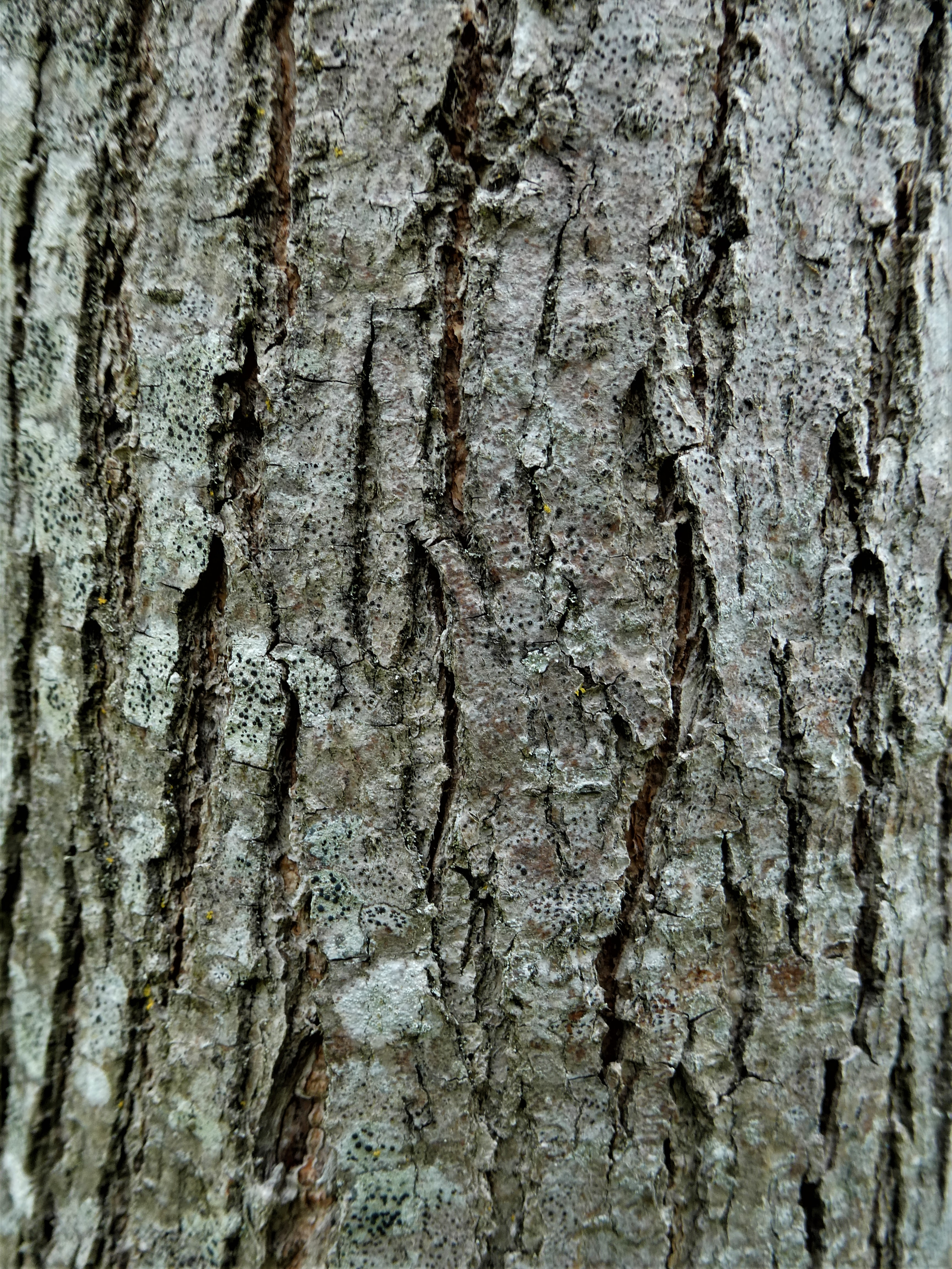
'Arno' bark, tree aged 20 years

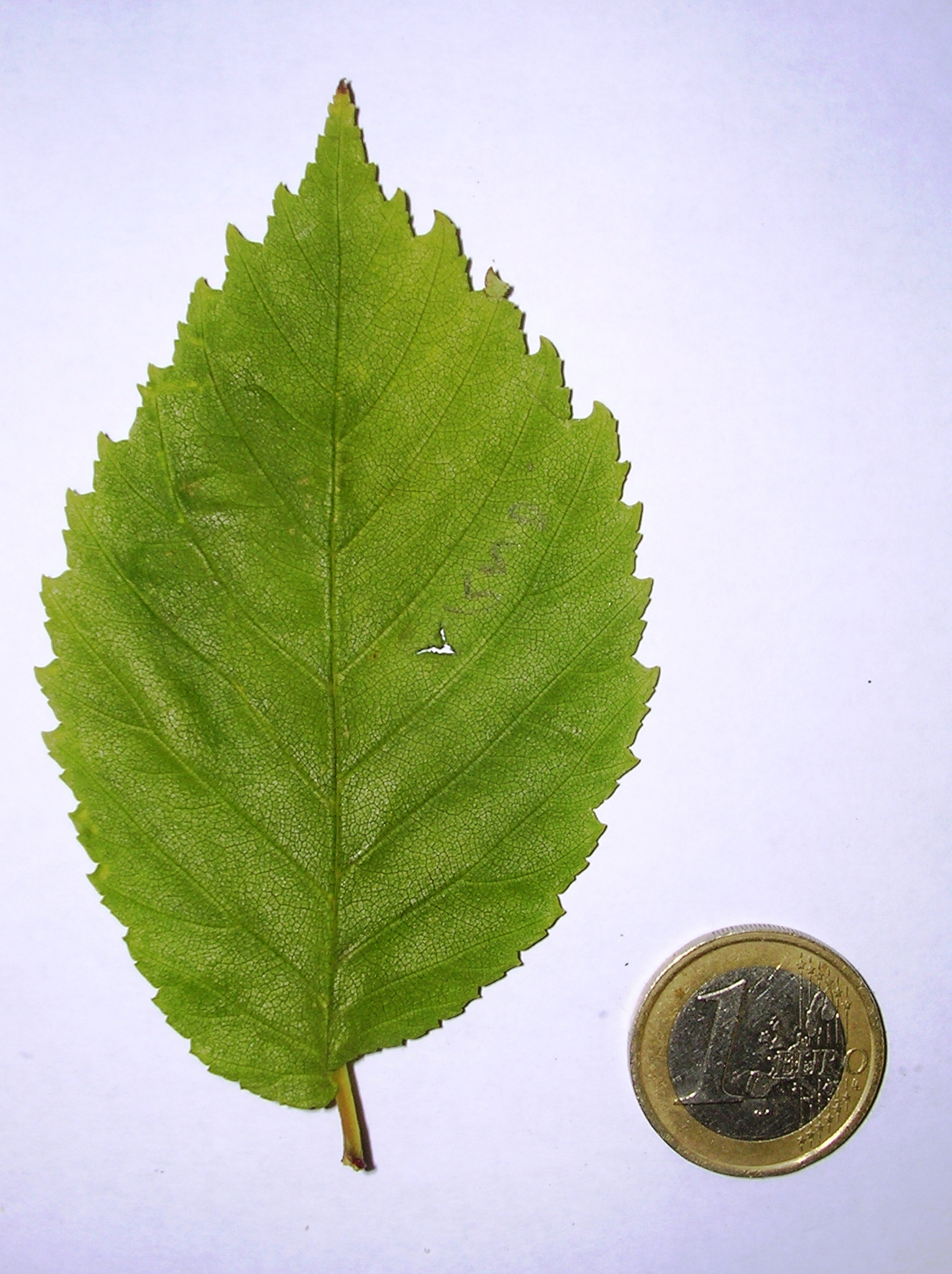
Leaf and 1 Euro coin.

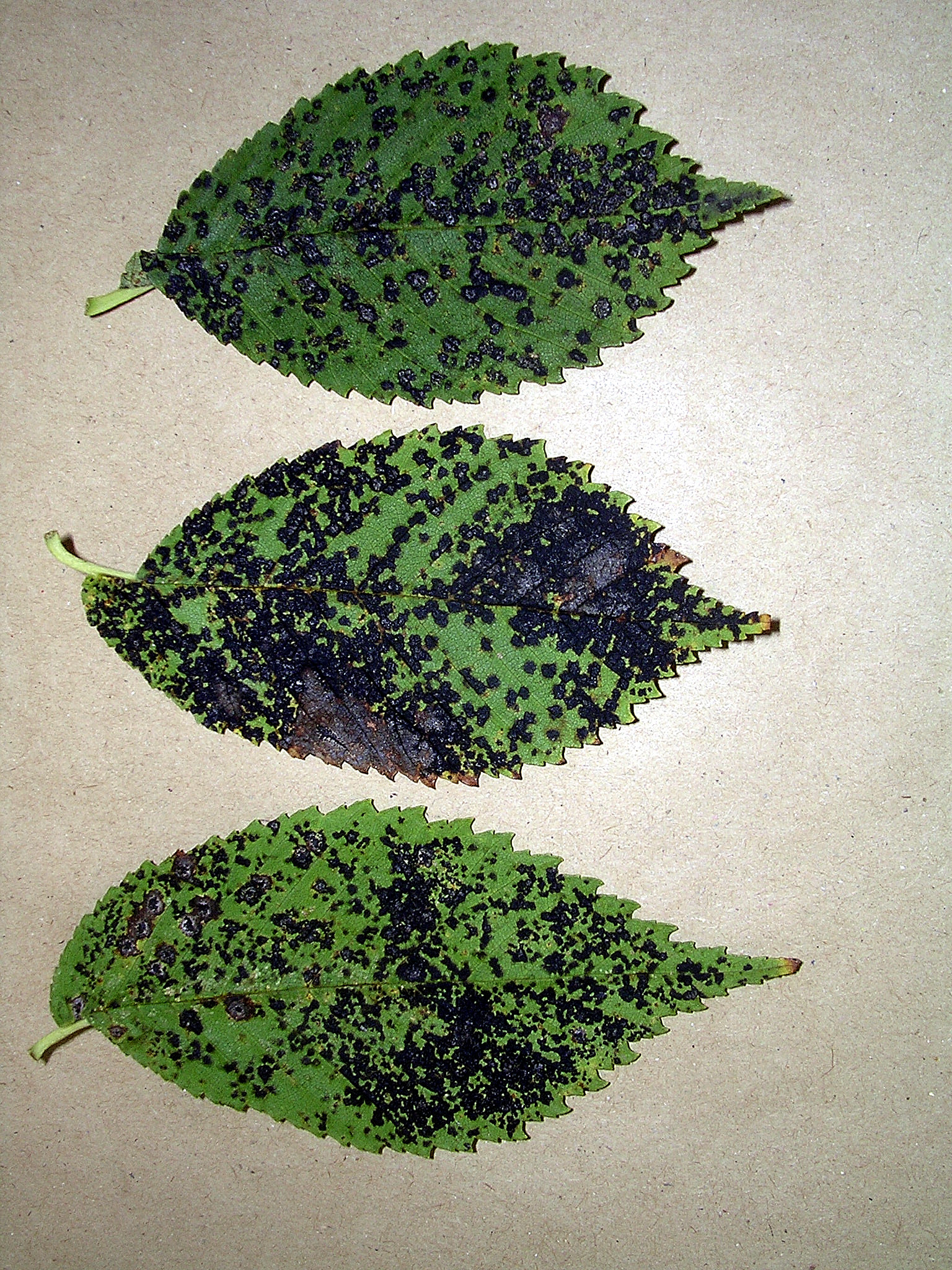
Rhytisma ulmi on 'Arno'

== Pests and diseases ==
Tested by inoculation with the pathogen, 'Arno' displayed moderate resistance ('3') to Dutch elm disease, lower than 'Lobel' and Plantyn' ('4'). 'Arno' is also resistant to elm yellows; susceptibility to the elm leaf beetle Xanthogaleruca luteola is much the same as that of the field elm Ulmus minor. In trials in England, leaves were afflicted by the fungus Rhytisma ulmi.

== Cultivation ==
'Arno' has reputedly performed extremely well in trials in northern Italy, even where grown on poor clay soils. The clone was introduced to the UK by Butterfly Conservation in 2007, and to The Netherlands by Noordplant, but is not known elsewhere in Europe, and has not been introduced to North America or Australasia. 'Arno' is no longer in commerce in Italy.

== Etymology ==
'Arno' is named for the river Arno which flows through the city of Florence.

== Accessions ==
=== Europe ===
- Grange Farm Arboretum, Sutton St James, Spalding, Lincs., UK. Acc. no. 816.
- Royal Botanic Garden Edinburgh. Acc. no. 20070205
- Netherlands Plant Collection Ulmus, Wijdemeren, Netherlands, planted 2020

== Nurseries ==
None.
