= Ulmus 'Wanoux' =

Elm cultivar

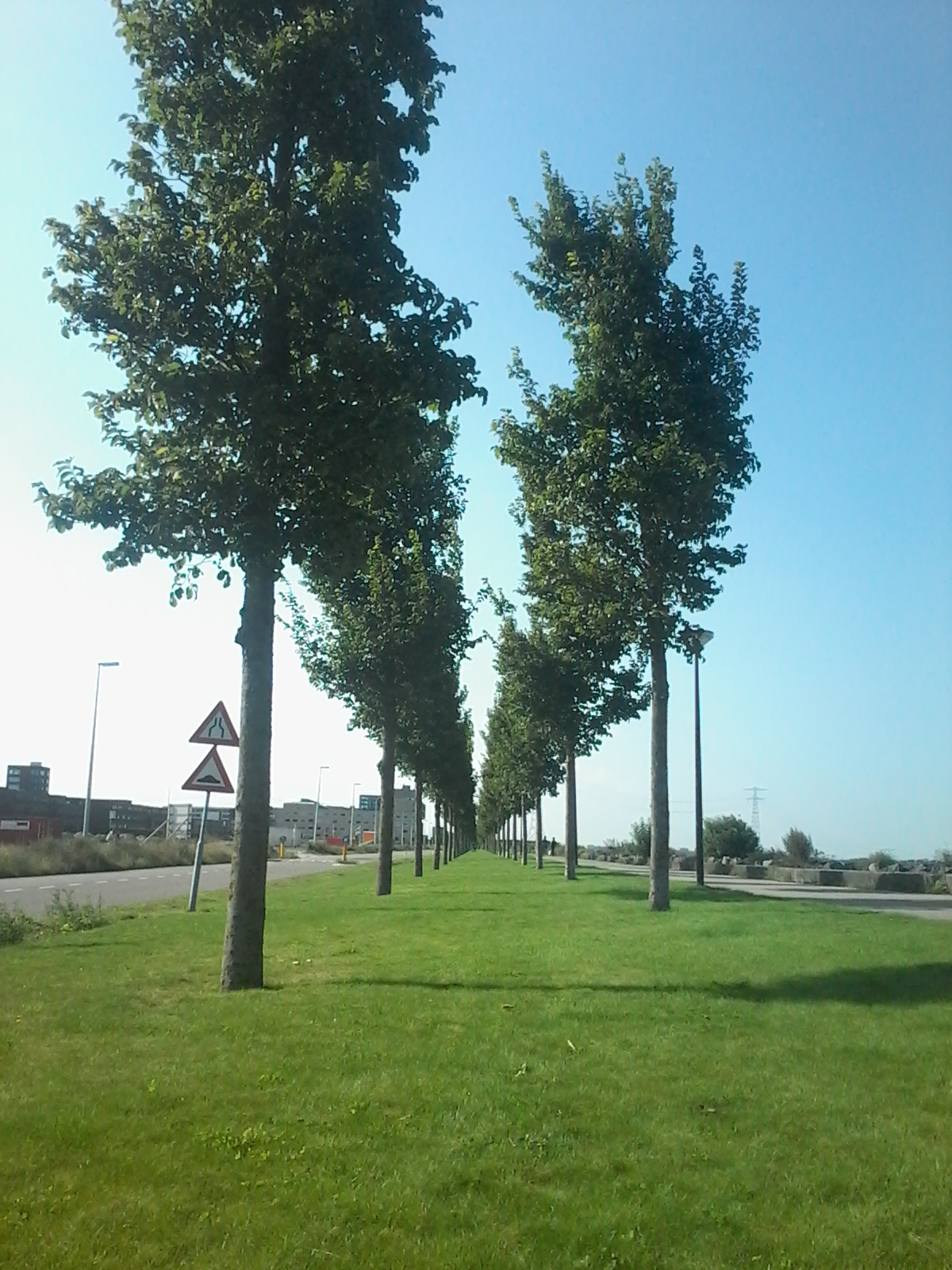
- Vada lines, IJburg, Amsterdam, 2014
- Genus: Ulmus
- Hybrid parentage: 'Plantyn' o.p.
- Cultivar: 'Wanoux' = Vada
- Origin: Netherlands

Ulmus 'Wanoux' (selling name Vada) is a Dutch hybrid cultivar raised at the Dorschkamp Research Institute for Forestry & Landscape Planning, Wageningen, from an open pollination of 'Plantyn'. Originally identified as clone No. 762, it was selected for assessment by the French Institut National de la Recherche Agronomique (INRA), which patented it as 'Wanoux' (Vada) in 2006.

Vada was introduced to the UK by the Hampshire & Isle of Wight Branch, Butterfly Conservation, in 2008, as part of its assessment of DED-resistant cultivars as potential hosts of the endangered White-letter Hairstreak.

Unlicenced propagation of Vada is prohibited in Europe inc. the UK under Certificat d'Obtention Végétale (COV) EU 24403 until its expiry on 31 December 2039.

== Description ==
Vada is a narrow tree primarily intended for street planting. The glossy, dark-green leaves, < 11 cm long by 8 cm wide, are coarsely toothed and have conspicuous venation. The samarae are sub-orbicular, almost cordate, typically 15 mm long by 13 mm wide, the seed slightly nearer the shallow notch. Towards the end of the season, the leaves suffer from various afflictions and can appear shabby. Leafing is late, but not quite as late as its stablemate Lutèce. Many minor buds fail to burst, so that young plants are rather sparsely furnished; in combination with the tree's limited lateral development, this can lead to a skeletal appearance. The tree has not been observed to sucker from its roots.

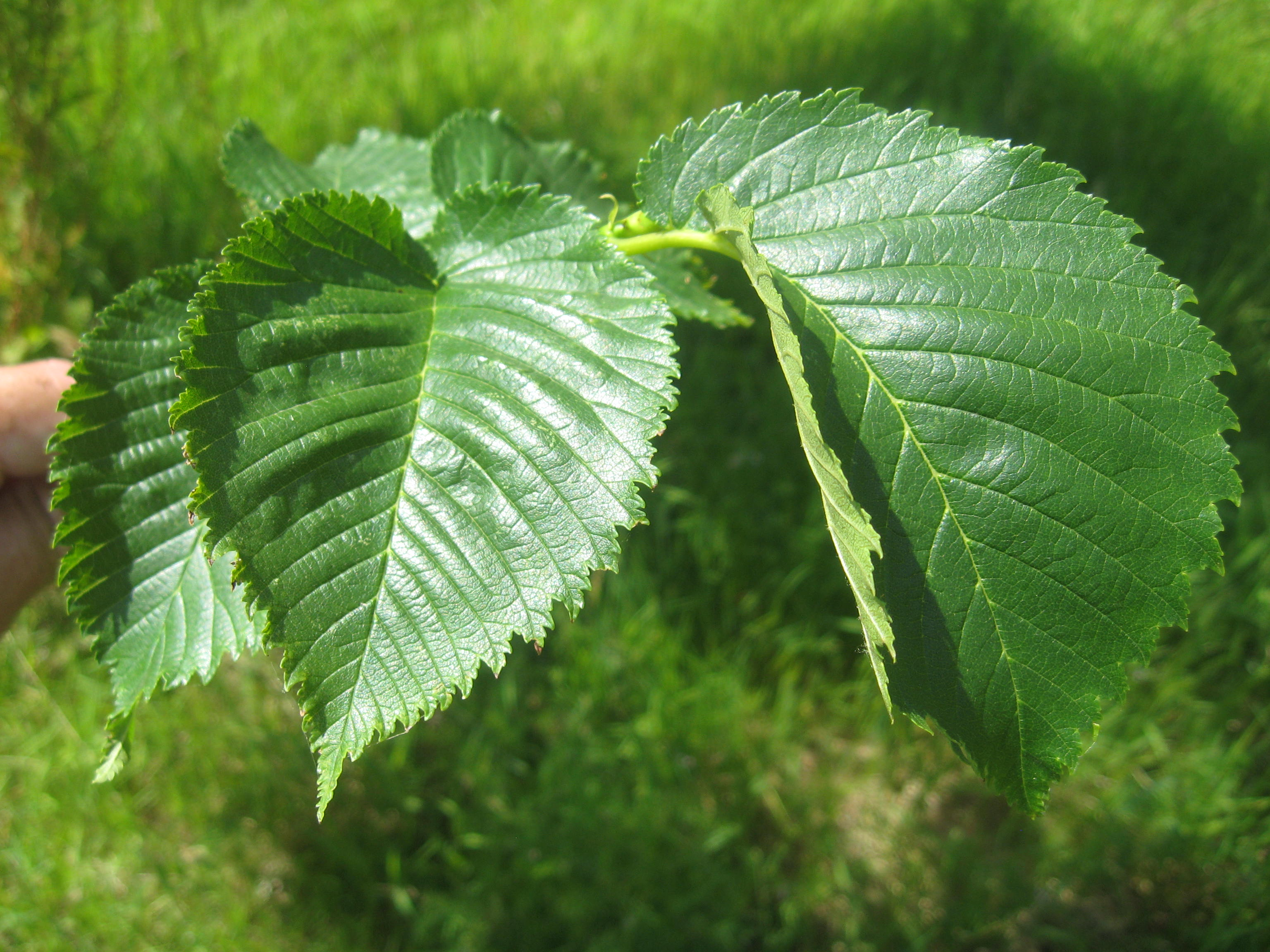
VADA leaves

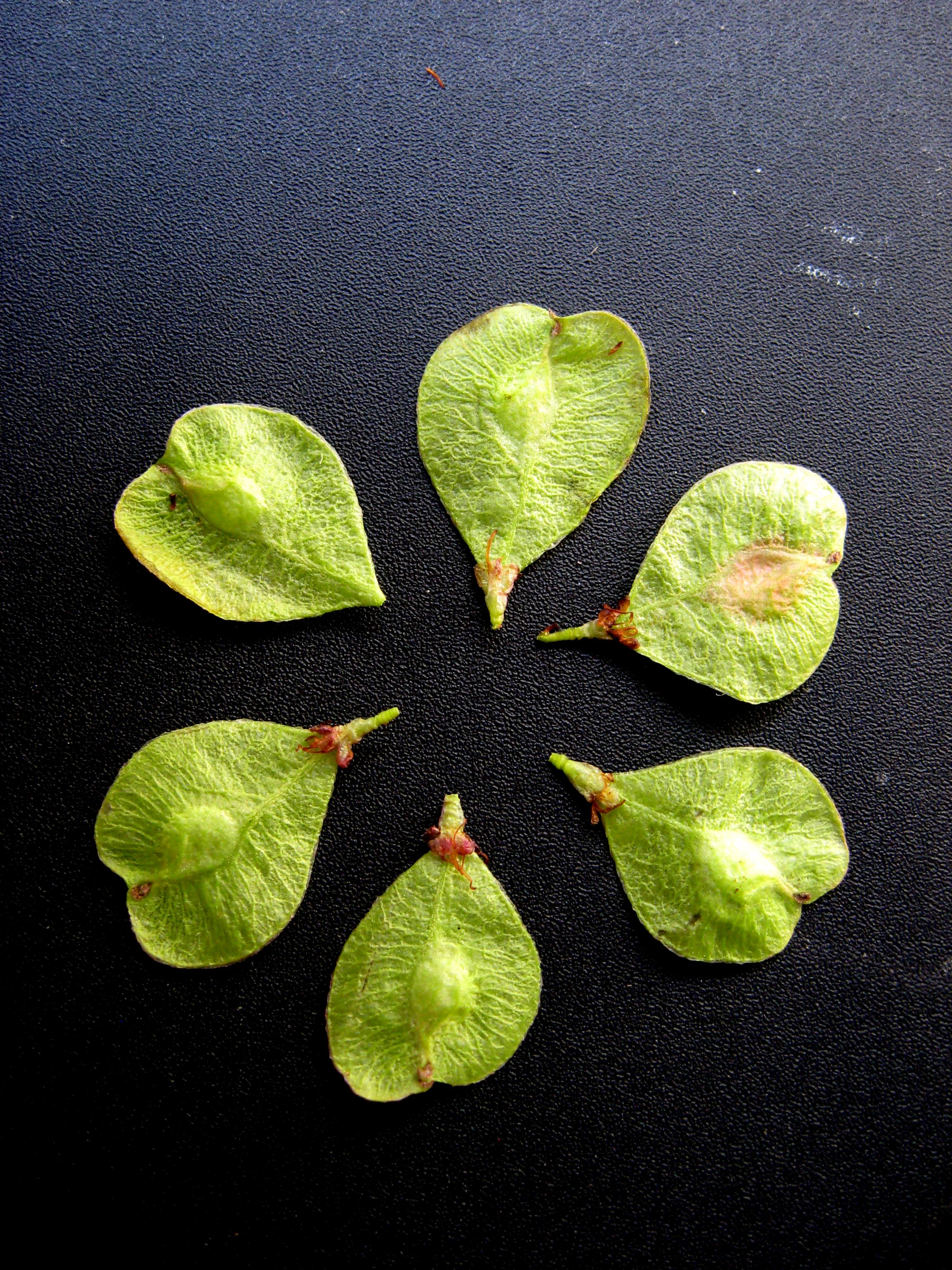
VADA samarae

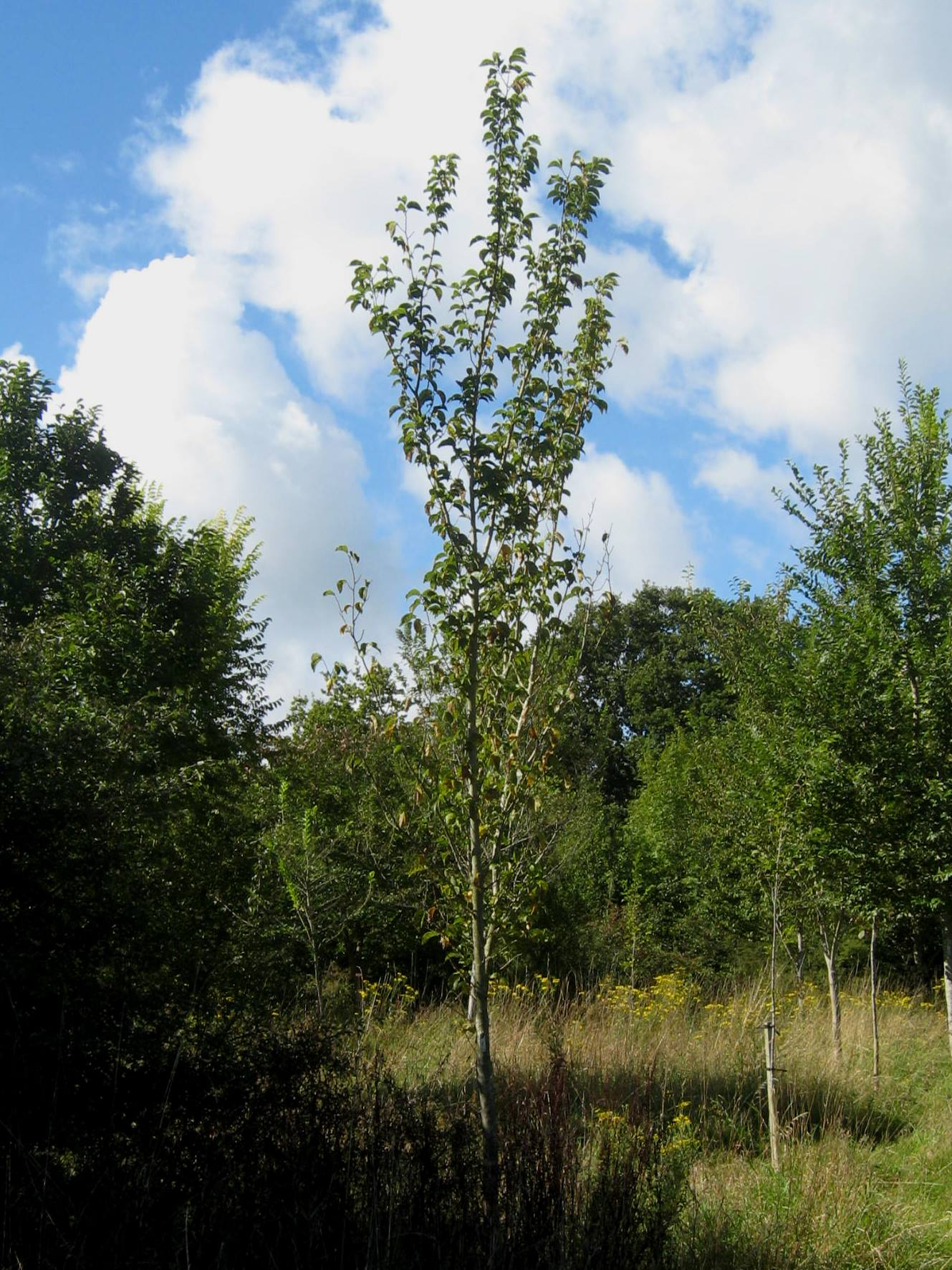
VADA, aged 8 years, Great Fontley, UK

== Pests and diseases ==
Tests in France by INRA found the tree to be 'highly resistant' to Dutch elm disease, exhibiting the lowest wilting percentage of all the clones trialled, making it comparable with 'Sapporo Autumn Gold' However, the presence of U. wallichiana in the ancestry of Vada poses the risk of susceptibility to elm yellows (phloem necrosis), which seriously damaged its Dutch stablemate 'Lobel' used as a control in the Italian elm breeding programme. The clone has also proven susceptible to Coral spot fungus Nectria cinnabarina in the Netherlands.

In trials in southern England, the leaves were found to remain completely free of black spot.

== Cultivation ==
Vada has moderate vigour, attaining a height of 14 m at 20 years of age in France. The tree is reputedly easily propagated from cuttings. Vada was introduced to North America in 2010, with the supply of two small specimens to the USDA, Washington, D.C., released from quarantine in 2013. Vada is reported "the most successful so far" (2021) of a 2014 trial planting of elms at Lees Court, Kent. Among urban introductions in the UK are three specimens, planted in 2014, towards the east end of Broad Walk, Christ Church Meadow, Oxford, and four in Inverleith Park, Edinburgh, planted c.2012. 300 VADA were planted circa 2019 in the Parc de Sceaux, southern Paris, and early in 2021 92 were planted in the jardin des Tuileries.

'Wanoux' has been planted in the Netherlands, notably among the line of 140 elms on the ‘s-Gravelandsevaartweg, Loosdrecht (ten trees near the southern end, north of the 'Plinio', planted 2014), part of Wijdemeren City Council's elm collection, assembled since 2003 by tree manager Martin Tijdgat and his colleagues.

Vada is not known to have been introduced to Australasia.

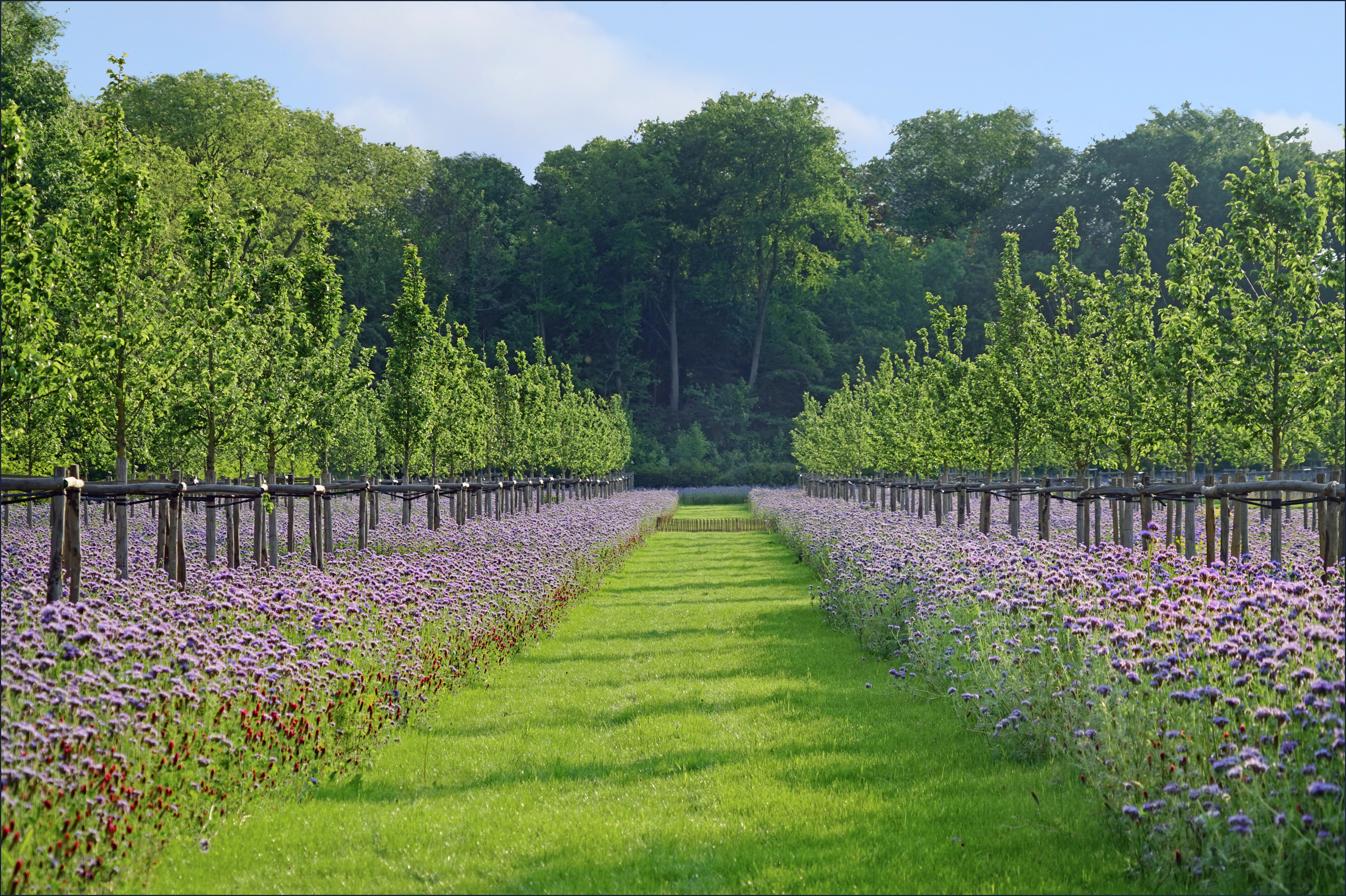
'Wanoux' avenue in the Parc de Sceaux, 2019

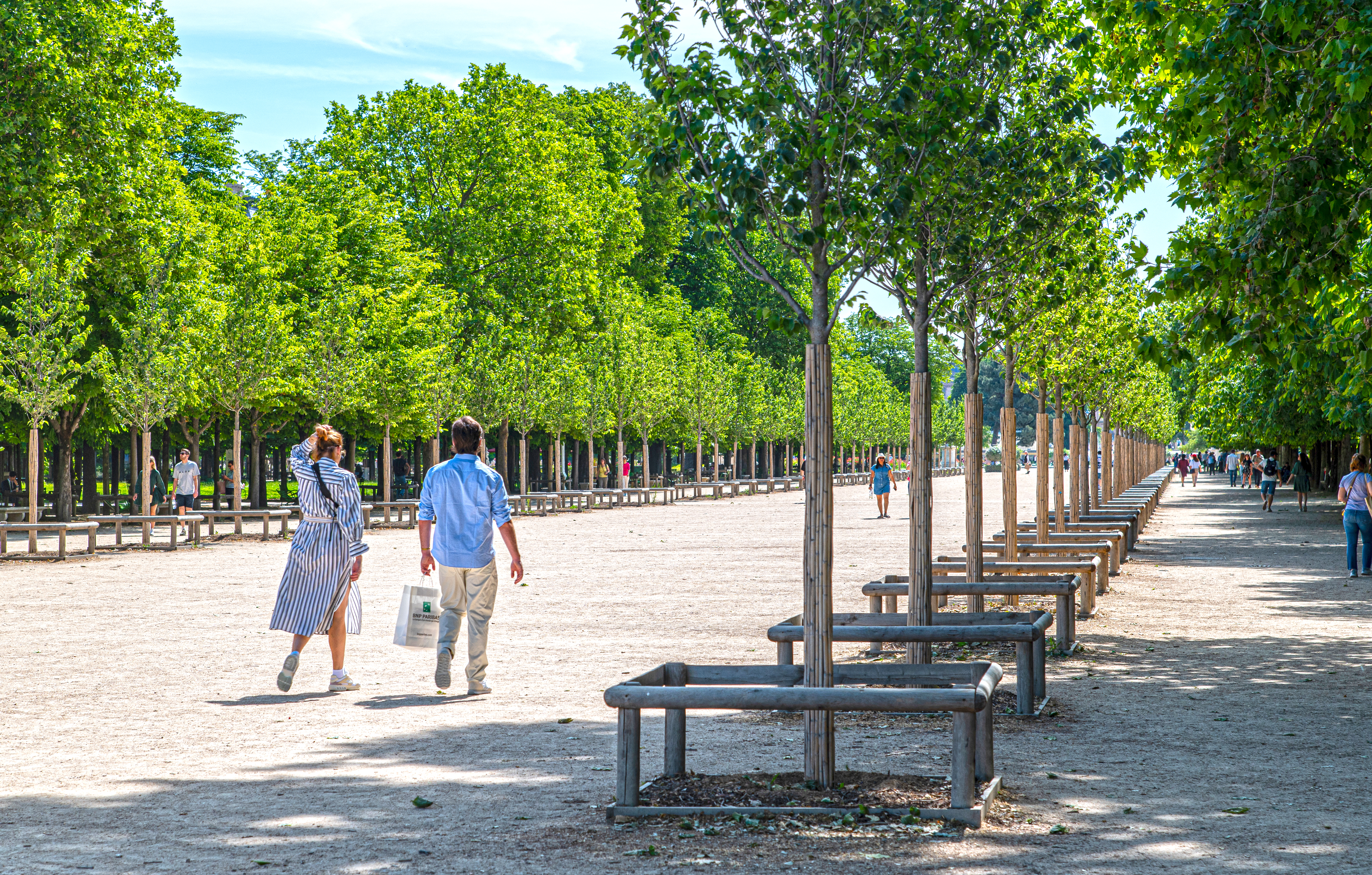
'Wanoux' in the Tuileries, May 2022

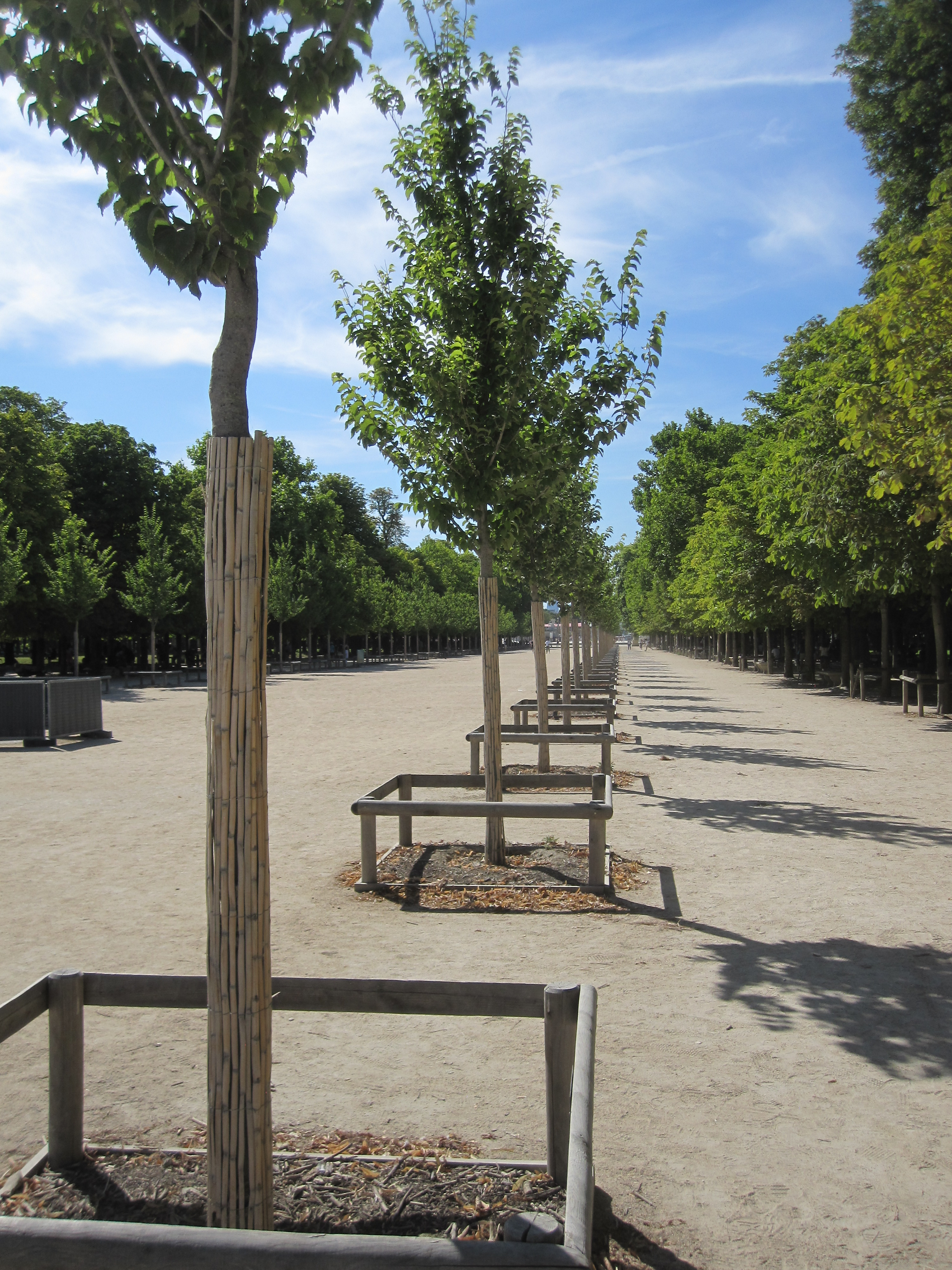
'Wanoux' in the Tuileries, 2022

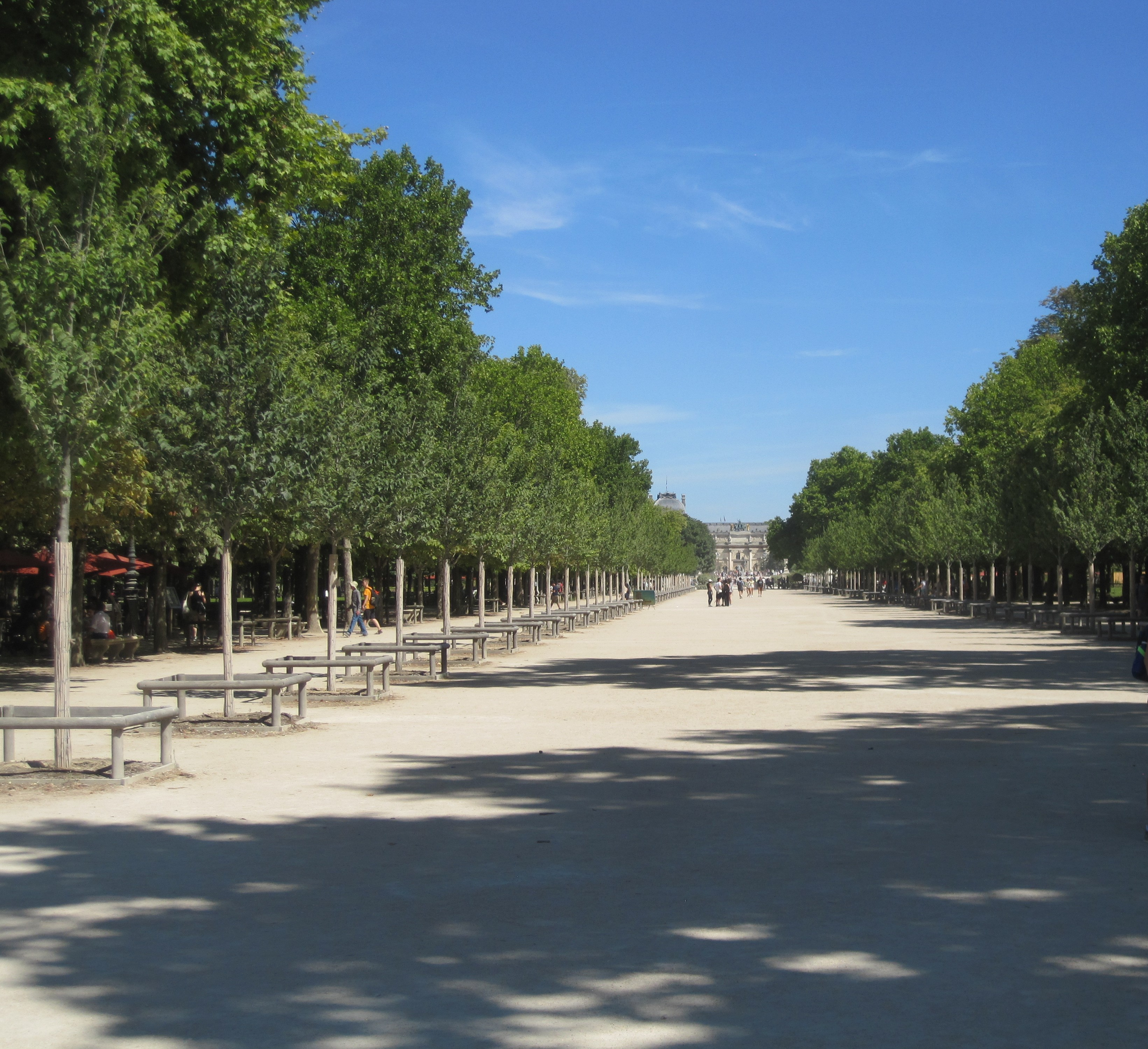
'Wanoux' avenue in the Tuileries, 2022

== Notable trees ==
Former French prime minister Lionel Jospin insisted on planting an elm, the tree of the Left when, in keeping with tradition, he was obliged to plant a tree in the garden of the Hôtel Matignon, his official residence in Paris, in 1998. He chose Vada, then still known only by its Dutch trial identity of '762'. The Left, however, does not have a monopoly on elms. 'The Queen's Elm' planted on the main lawn of Holyrood Palace, Edinburgh, near the ruined Holyrood Abbey to mark the Diamond Jubilee of Elizabeth II (2012), is also an Ulmus Vada.

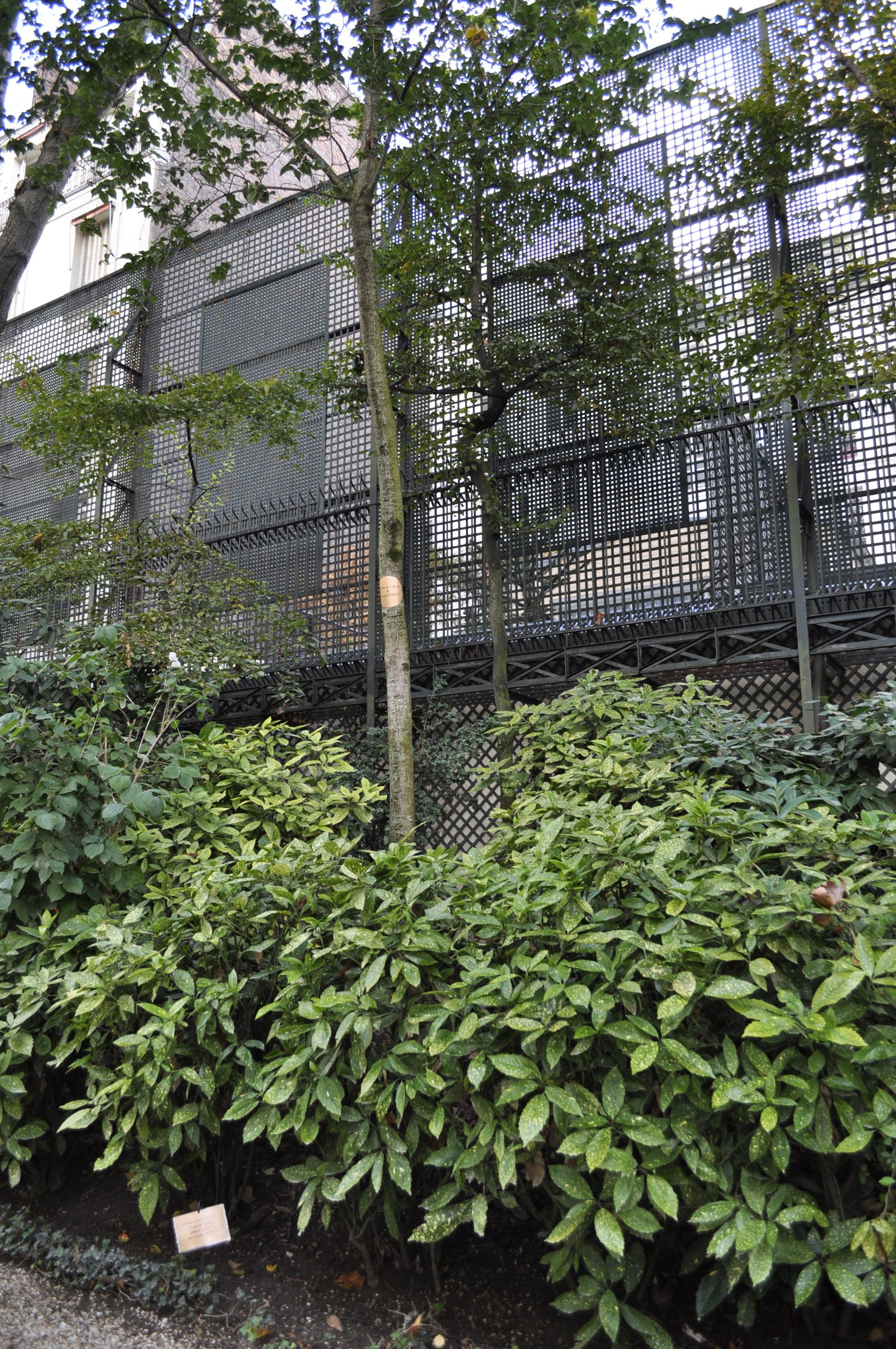
Orme de Lionel Jospin, Hôtel Matignon (2015)

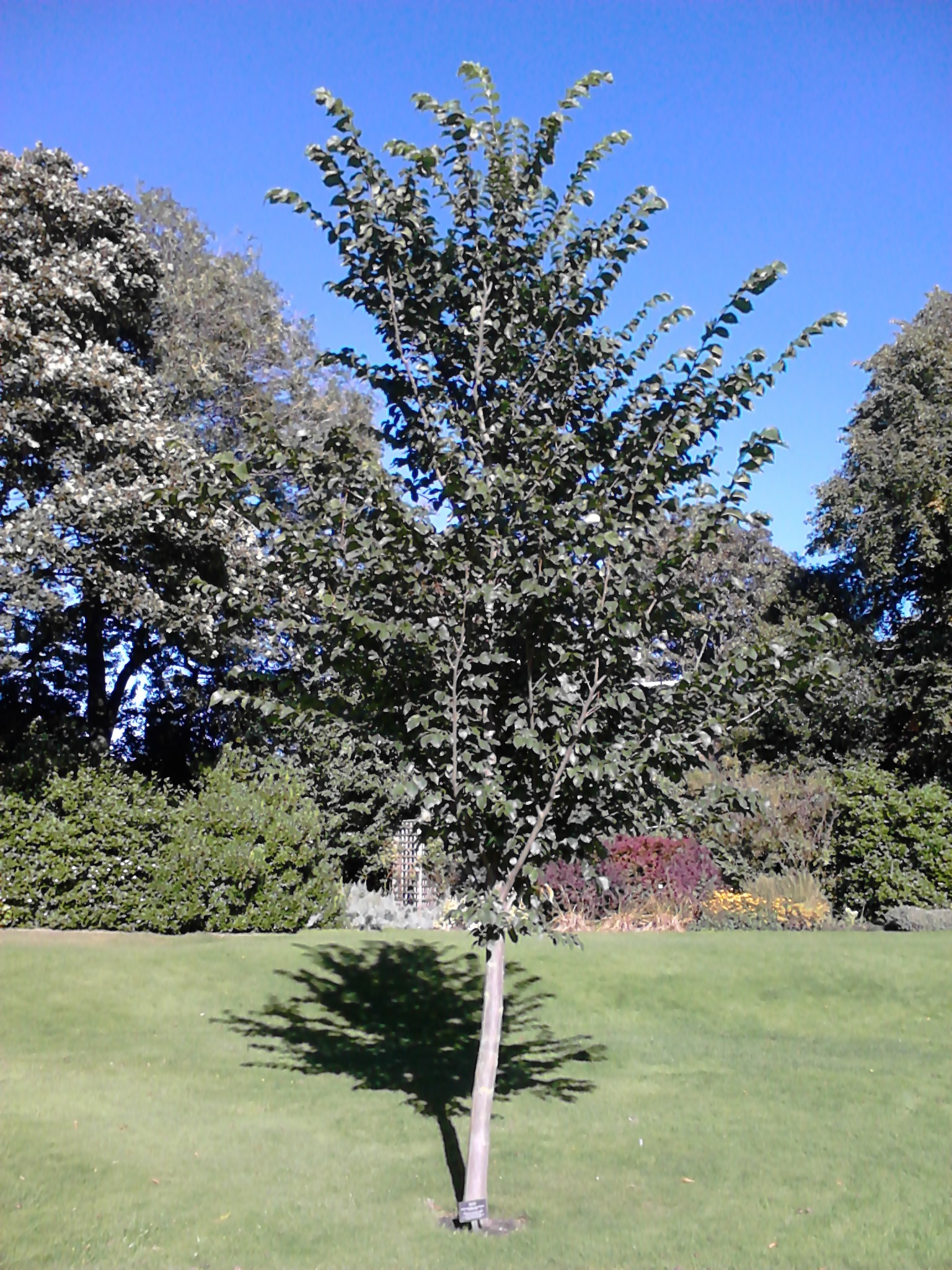
'The Queen's Elm', Holyrood Palace (2016)

== Etymology ==
The registered cultivar name 'Wanoux' is a contraction of Wageningen and Champenoux, the locations of the Dutch and French research stations. The selling name VADA was the ancient Roman name of Wageningen.

== Accessions ==
=== Europe ===
- Grange Farm Arboretum, Lincolnshire, UK. Acc. no. 693.
- Great Fontley Farm, Fareham, UK. Butterfly Conservation Elm Trials plantation, Home Field: one small sapling planted 2008.
- Longstock Park Arboretum, Longstock, Stockbridge, Hampshire, UK. One small sapling planted 2010.
- Royal Botanic Garden Edinburgh, UK. Acc. no. 20090115.
- Sir Harold Hillier Gardens, Romsey, UK. Acc. no. 2008.0639.

=== North America ===
- United States National Arboretum, Washington, D.C., US. 2 small trees.

== Nurseries ==
- Boomkwekerij Ebben, Cuijk, Netherlands.
- F P Matthews 'Trees for Life', Tenbury Wells, Worcestershire, UK. Bare-root whips.
- Van Den Berk (UK) Ltd., London, UK. Standards.
