= San Zanobi =

San Zanobi may refer to:

- The Italian name of Saint Zenobius
- Ulmus 'San Zanobi', an elm cultivar named after Saint Zenobius
