= Ulmus 'Plantyn' =

Elm cultivar

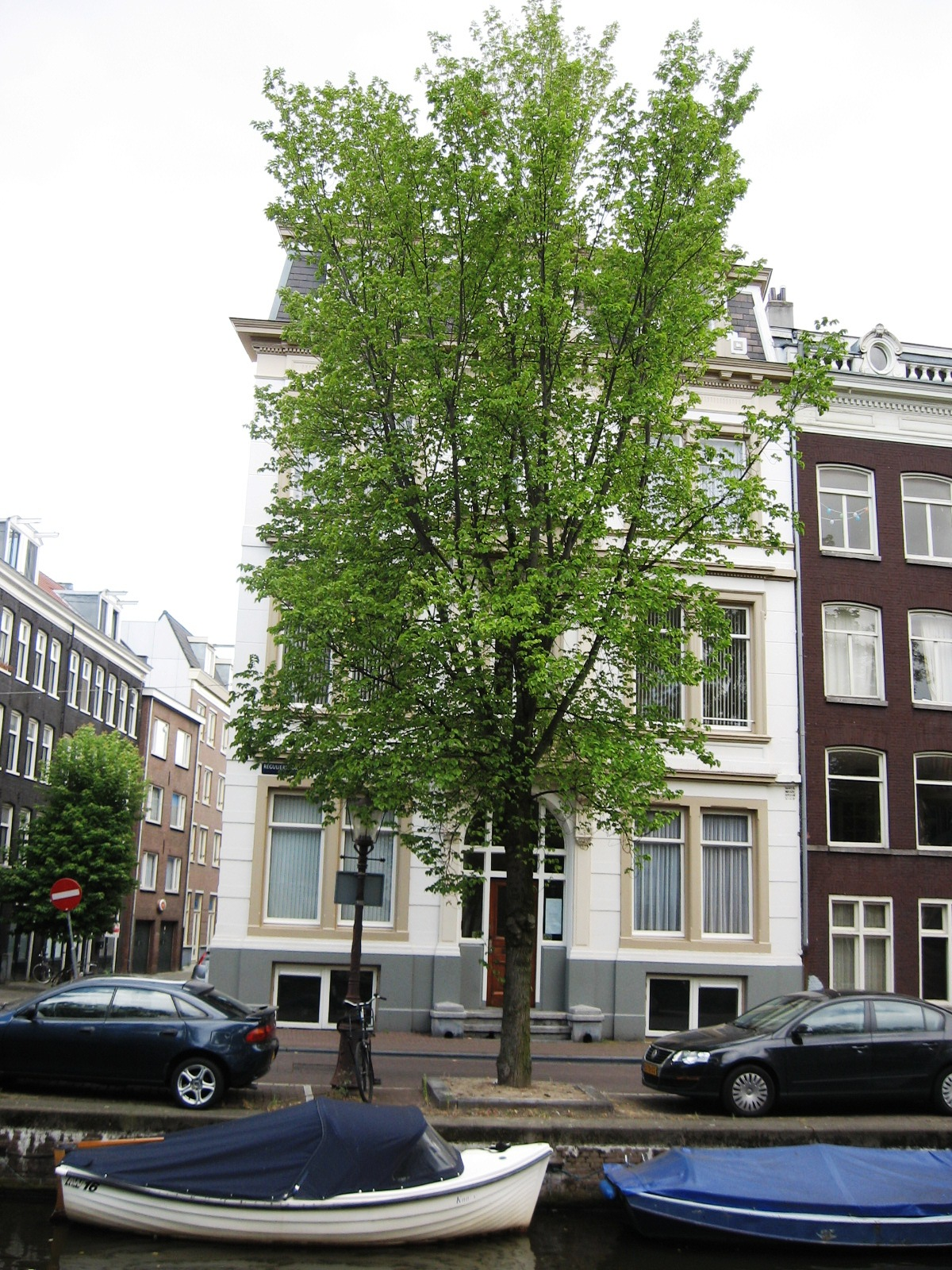
- 'Plantyn', Amsterdam.
- Genus: Ulmus
- Hybrid parentage: ('Exoniensis' × U. wallichiana) × (U. minor '1' × U. minor '28')
- Cultivar: 'Plantyn'
- Origin: Wageningen, The Netherlands

Ulmus 'Plantyn' (Anglicized form of 'Plantijn') was one of three Dutch hybrid elms released by the Dorschkamp Research Institute for Forestry & Landscape Planning, Wageningen, in 1973. Derived from a crossing of the Dutch hybrids '202' (U. 'Exoniensis' × U. wallichiana) and '302' (U. minor '1' × U. minor '28'), it was to prove of great significance in later developments. A selfed seedling was to become the first Dutch clone to prove effectively immune to disease, released in 1989 as 'Columella'. 'Plantyn' was also destined to be the female parent of Lutèce released in 2002. In Italy, 'Plantyn' was used again as female parent in hybridizations with the Siberian Elm Ulmus pumila by the Istituto per la Protezione delle Piante (IPP), to create three new cultivars better adapted to the Mediterranean climate (see Hybrid cultivars).

== Description ==
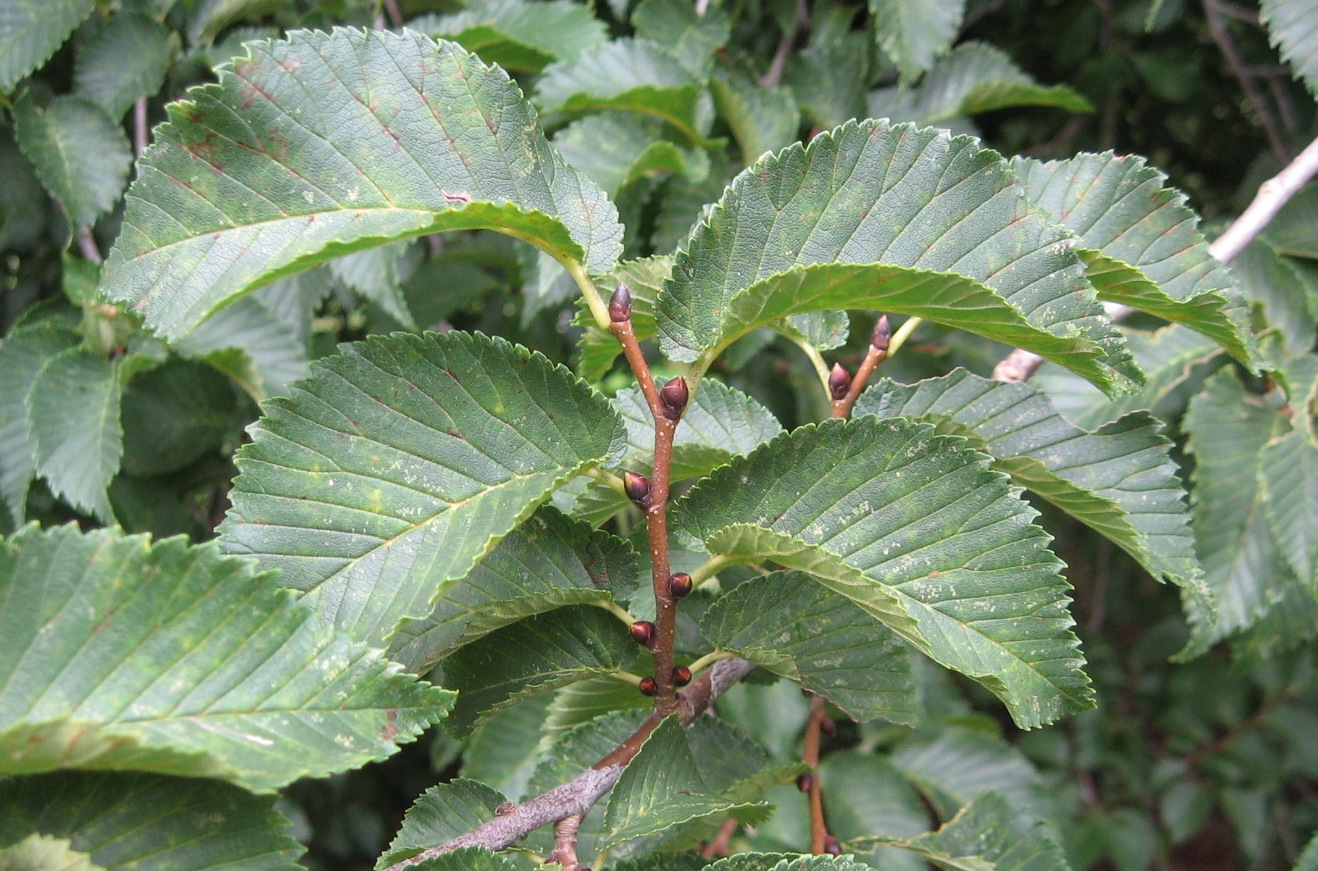
'Plantyn' leaves, Kew Gardens

'Plantyn' is a fast-growing tree, with upright branching forming a broad crown where grown in isolation. The dark-green leaves are < 10 cm long by 7 cm broad, on < 10 mm petioles.

== Pests and diseases ==
'Plantyn' is no more resistant to Dutch elm disease than its Dutch contemporaries 'Dodoens' and 'Lobel' according to one source, rating 4 out of 5. However, research published in France by the Institut National de la Recherche Agronomique (INRA) indicated that 'Plantyn' possesses a greater degree of disease resistance than the other two cultivars, although neither had actually been tested by the organization. Nevertheless, INRA still classified 'Plantyn' as only 'moderately resistant'.

== Cultivation ==
Largely superseded by the later generation of cultivars highly resistant to Dutch elm disease, sales in the Netherlands declined from over 7,000 in 1979 to zero in 2004. Like its Dutch contemporaries, 'Plantyn' has, however, proven very tolerant of sea winds, and it is occasionally planted in coastal areas. Among examples are fourteen in Loosdrecht, Wijdemeren (ten in Draaibrug, ‘s-Gravelandsevaartweg, planted 2018, between the U. laevis 'Helena' and the U. laevis 'Westland' in the Iepenallee, and three in Kastanjelaan and one in Tjalk, planted 2014). There is a single specimen (2025) in Victoria Park, Edinburgh, planted c.2005.

'Plantyn' was not commercially released in the US, but was evaluated at the Iowa State University (acc. no. Q 28835); however it is no longer listed (2013) in the NPGS inventory. 'Plantyn' was also included in trials in Canberra, Australia, started in 1988, although it is reputed not to have thrived in that environment.

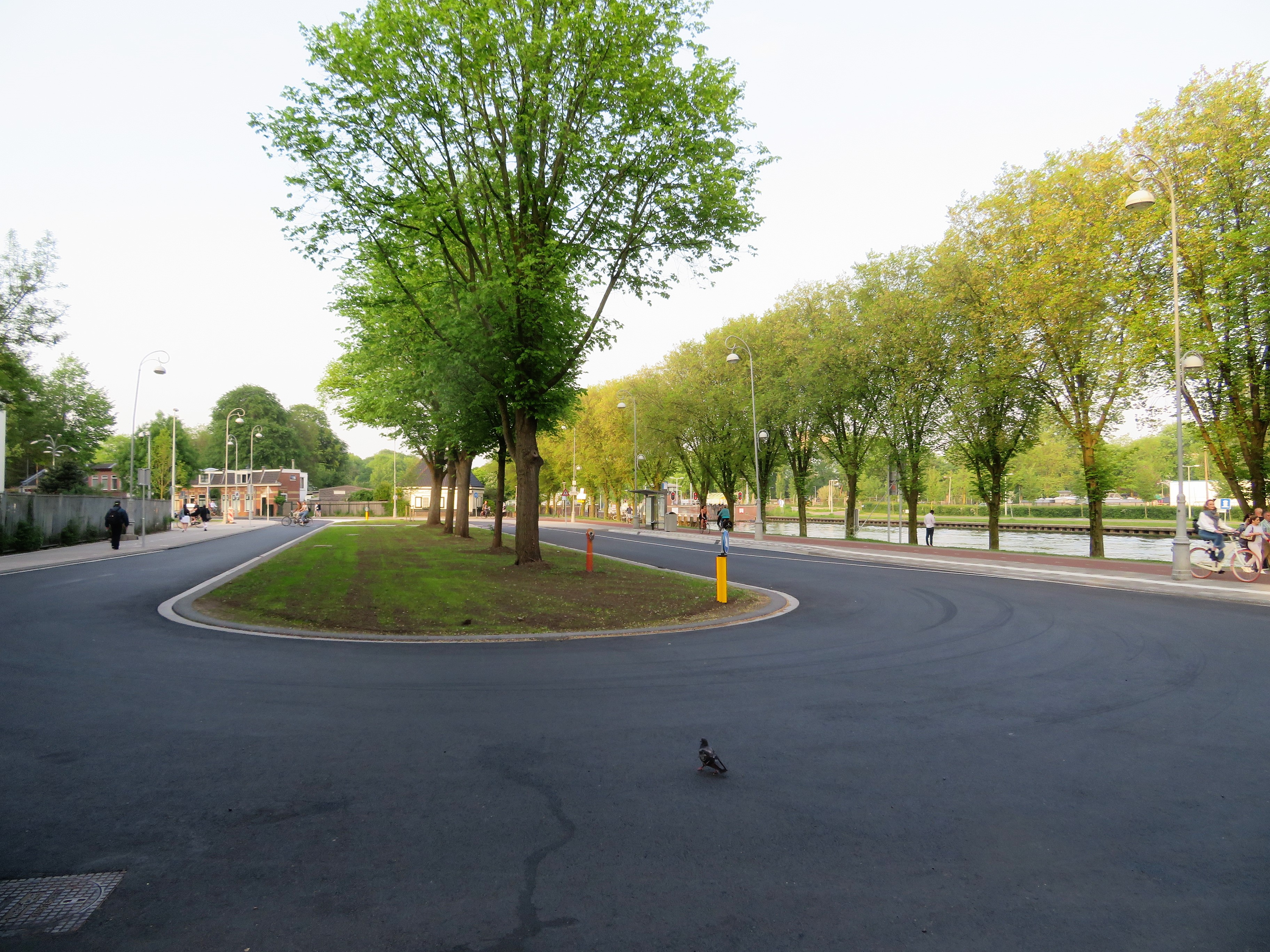
Line of 'Plantyn' (right), Buiksloterweg, Amsterdam (2018)

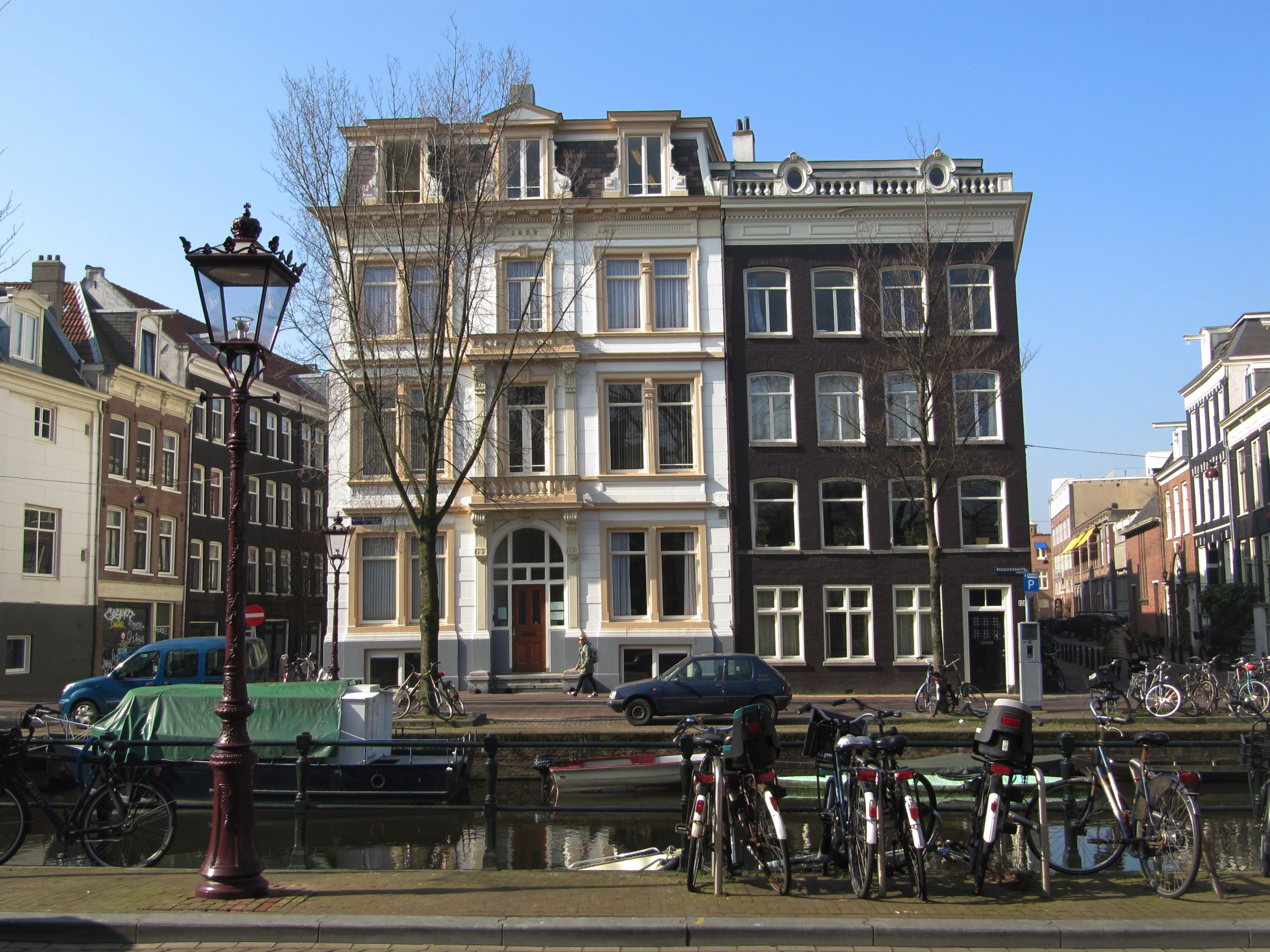
'Plantyn', Reguliersgracht, Amsterdam (March 2012)

== Notable trees ==
In the UK a specimen grows in Kensington Gardens, London, which was 16 m high, 45 cm d.b.h. in 2001. An elm in West Park, Wolverhampton, listed in 2017 by the TROBI as the UK champion 'Plantyn', was found on re-examination in 2025 to be an old 'Groeneveld'. It measured 20.5 m tall by 75 cm d.b.h. in 2017.

== Hybrid cultivars ==
- 'Arno', 'Columella', 'Nanguen' = LUTÈCE, 'Plinio', 'San Zanobi', 'Wanoux' = VADA
- Unreleased cultivars raised by IPP, Florence: 'FL 568' (U. pumila × 'Plantyn'), 'FL 620' & 'FL 624' ((U. pumila × U. minor) × 'Plantyn'), 'FL 688' (('Plantyn' × U. minor) × 'Plantyn'), 'FL 580' (Heybroek's '948')

== Etymology ==
The tree is named for the French printer and humanist Christoffel Plantijn (France: Christophe Plantin).

== Synonymy ==
'Plantijn' (original Dutch form of the name).

The tag on the specimen at Kew Gardens reads 'Plantion'.

== Accessions ==
Europe

- Arboretum de La Petite Loiterie , Monthodon, France. No details available
- Brighton & Hove City Council, UK. NCCPG Elm Collection.
- Grange Farm Arboretum, Lincolnshire, UK. Acc. no. 1089.
- Royal Botanic Gardens, Kew, UK. Acc. no. 1980–731
- Sir Harold Hillier Gardens, UK. Acc. no. 1982.4057
- Westonbirt Arboretum , Gloucestershire, UK. Acc. no. 1980/157.
