= Ulmus 'Plinio' =

Elm cultivar

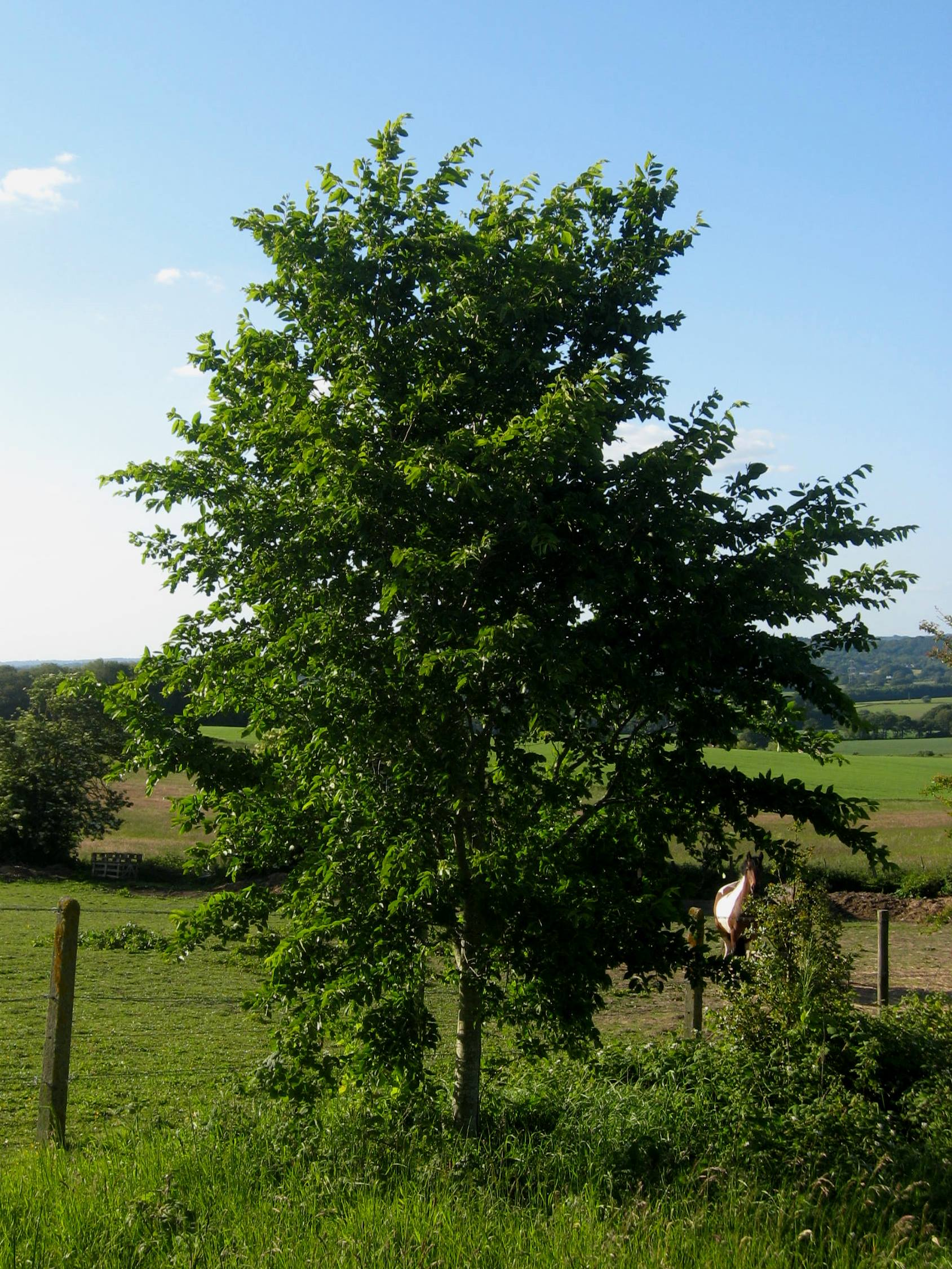
- 'Plinio' on chalk, Ports Down, UK.
- Genus: Ulmus
- Hybrid parentage: 'Plantyn' × U. pumila 'S.2'
- Cultivar: 'Plinio'
- Origin: IPP, Florence, Italy

Ulmus 'Plinio' is a hybrid elm cultivar derived from a crossing of the Dutch cultivar 'Plantyn' (female parent) with the Siberian Elm Ulmus pumila clone 'S.2'. 'Plinio' was raised by the Istituto per la Protezione delle Piante (IPP), in Florence and released for sale in 2003. 'Plinio' was introduced to the UK in 2004 by Hampshire & Isle of Wight Branch, Butterfly Conservation, as part of its assessment of DED-resistant cultivars as potential hosts of the endangered White-letter Hairstreak.

== Description ==
In Italy, 'Plinio' is a rounded tree with a broad crown, the width typically equalling 70% of height, and a short, often bent, trunk. The dark-green leaves are < 6.5 cm long by 3 cm broad and glabrous on both sides, on < 6 mm petioles. Like its compatriot 'San Zanobi', the tree is not possessed of striking autumn colours, the leaves remaining green almost until they fall in late November. The perfect, apetalous wind-pollinated flowers appear in mid March in the UK. The sessile samarae are round, 17–22 mm in diameter. Seed has exhibited a modest viability of between 10% and 20%.

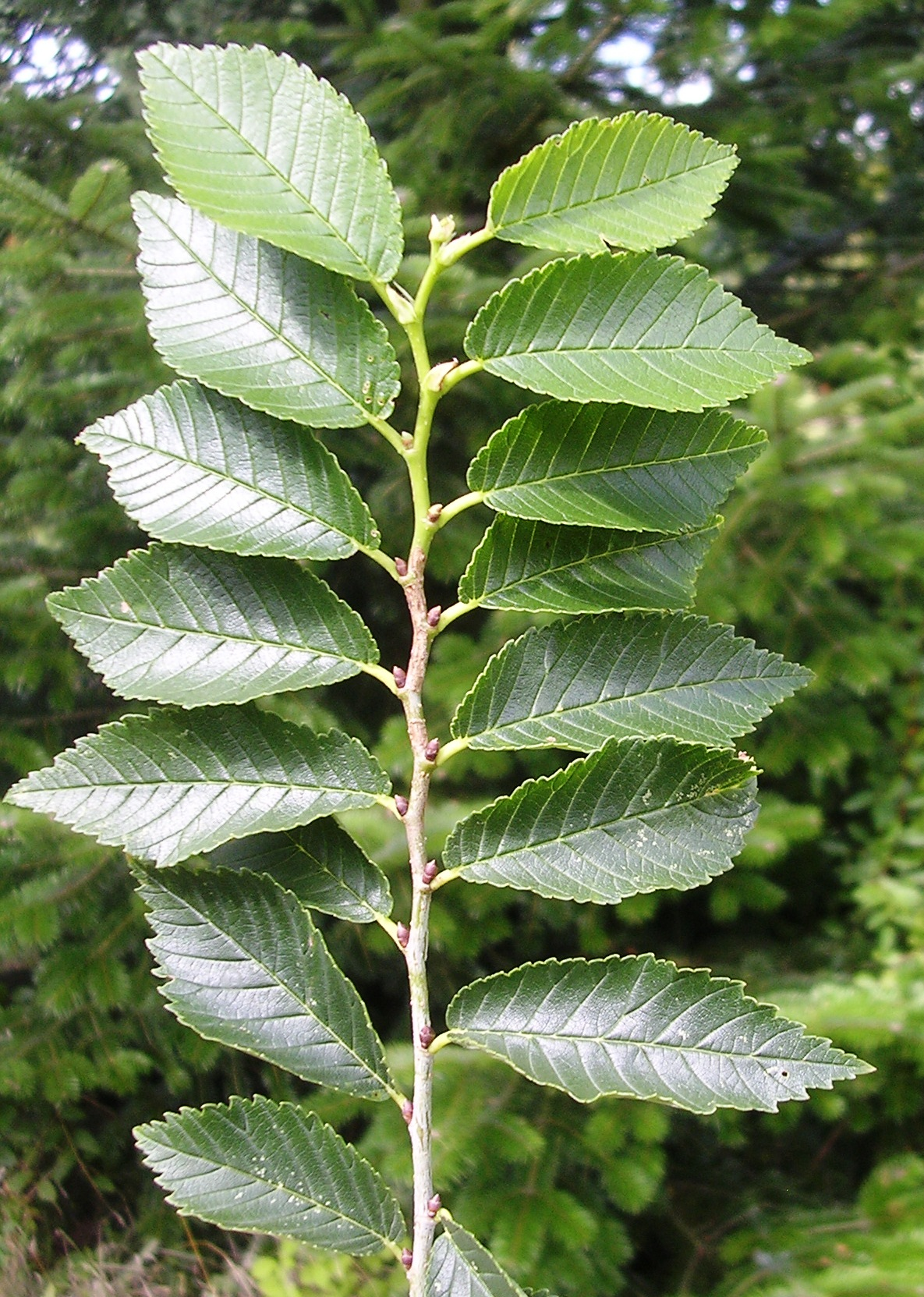
'Plinio' leaves

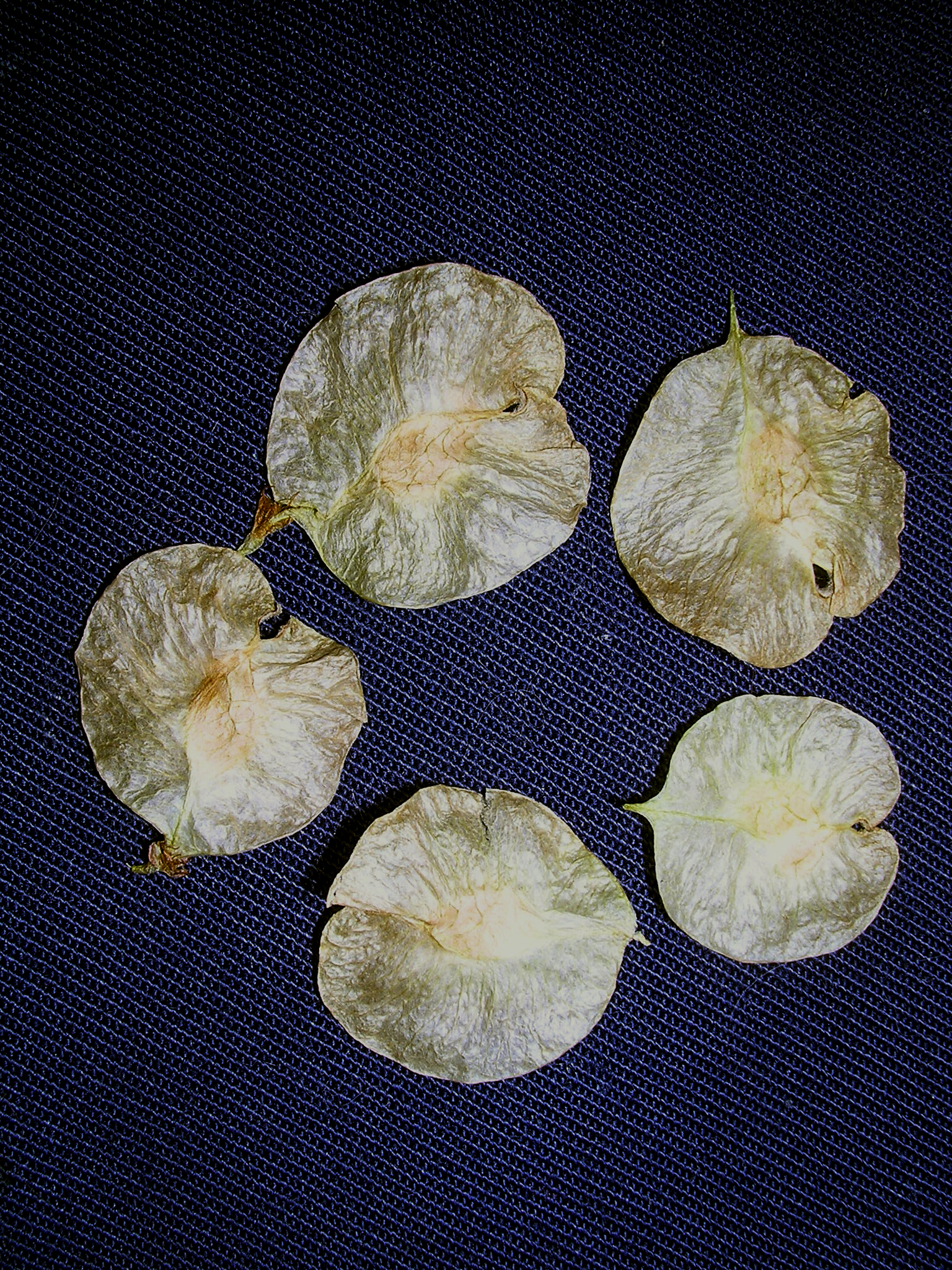
'Plinio' samarae

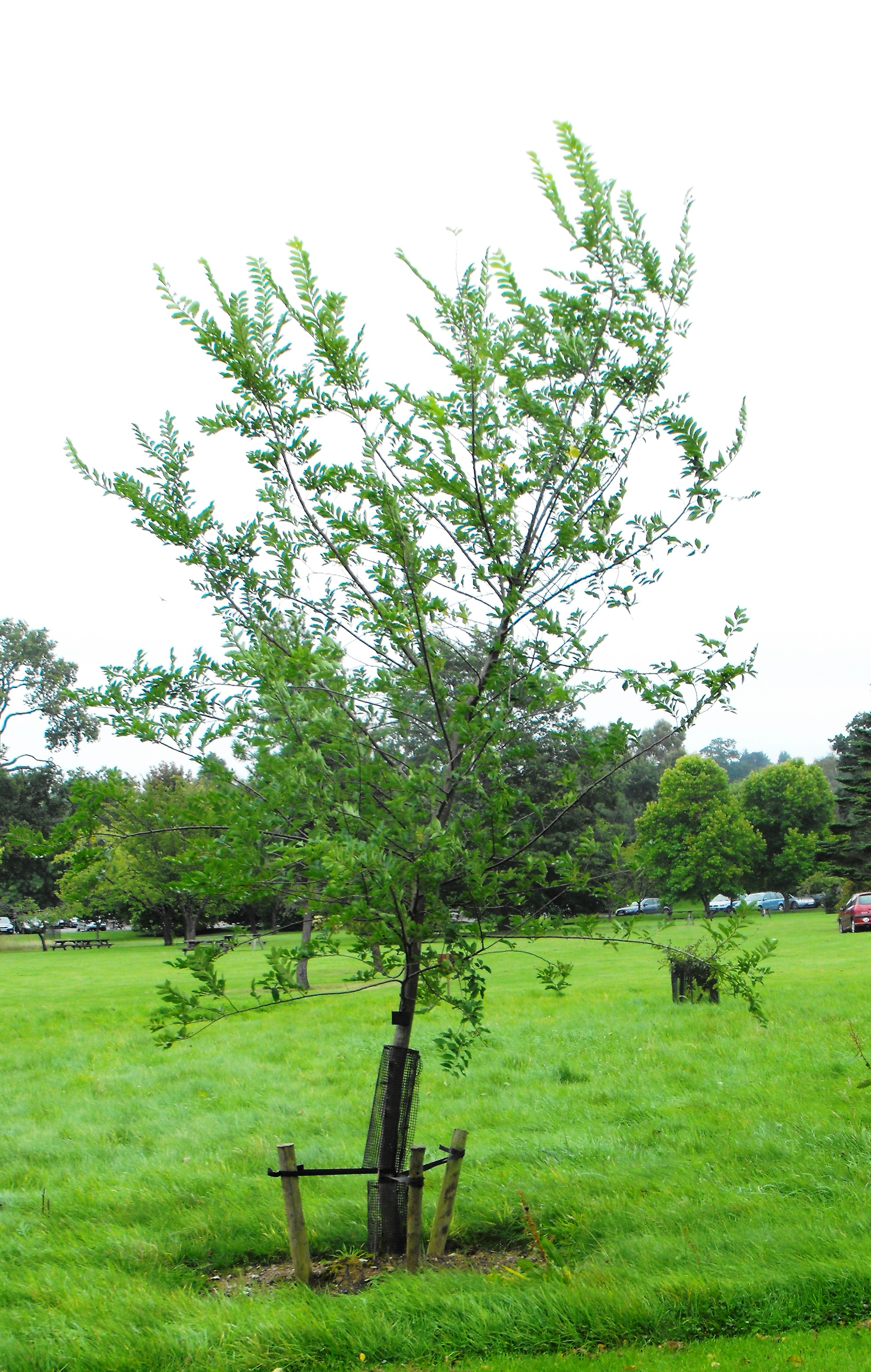
'Plinio' on fertile soil, Sir Harold Hillier Gardens

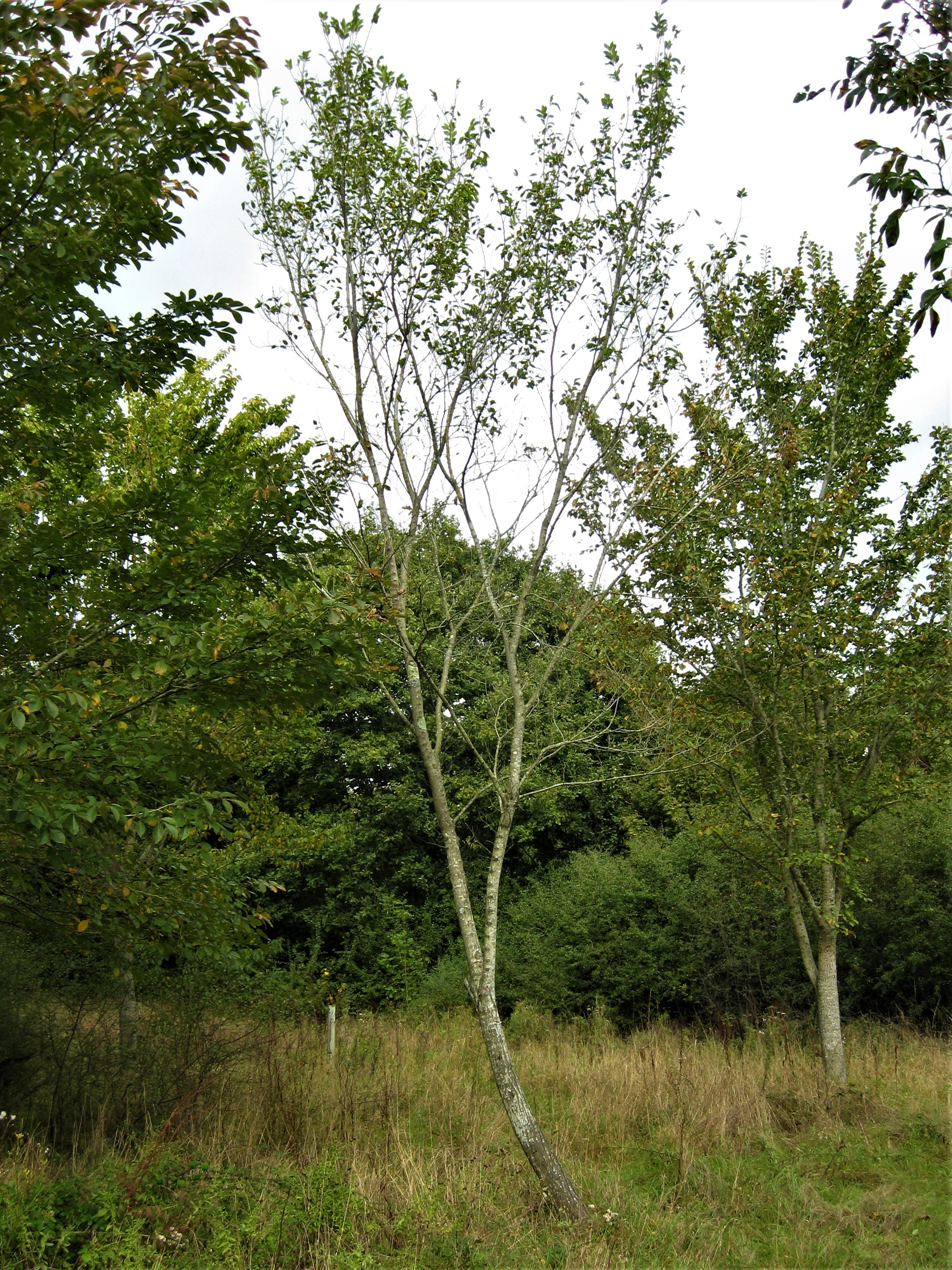
'Plinio' on fertile soil, Great Fontley, UK

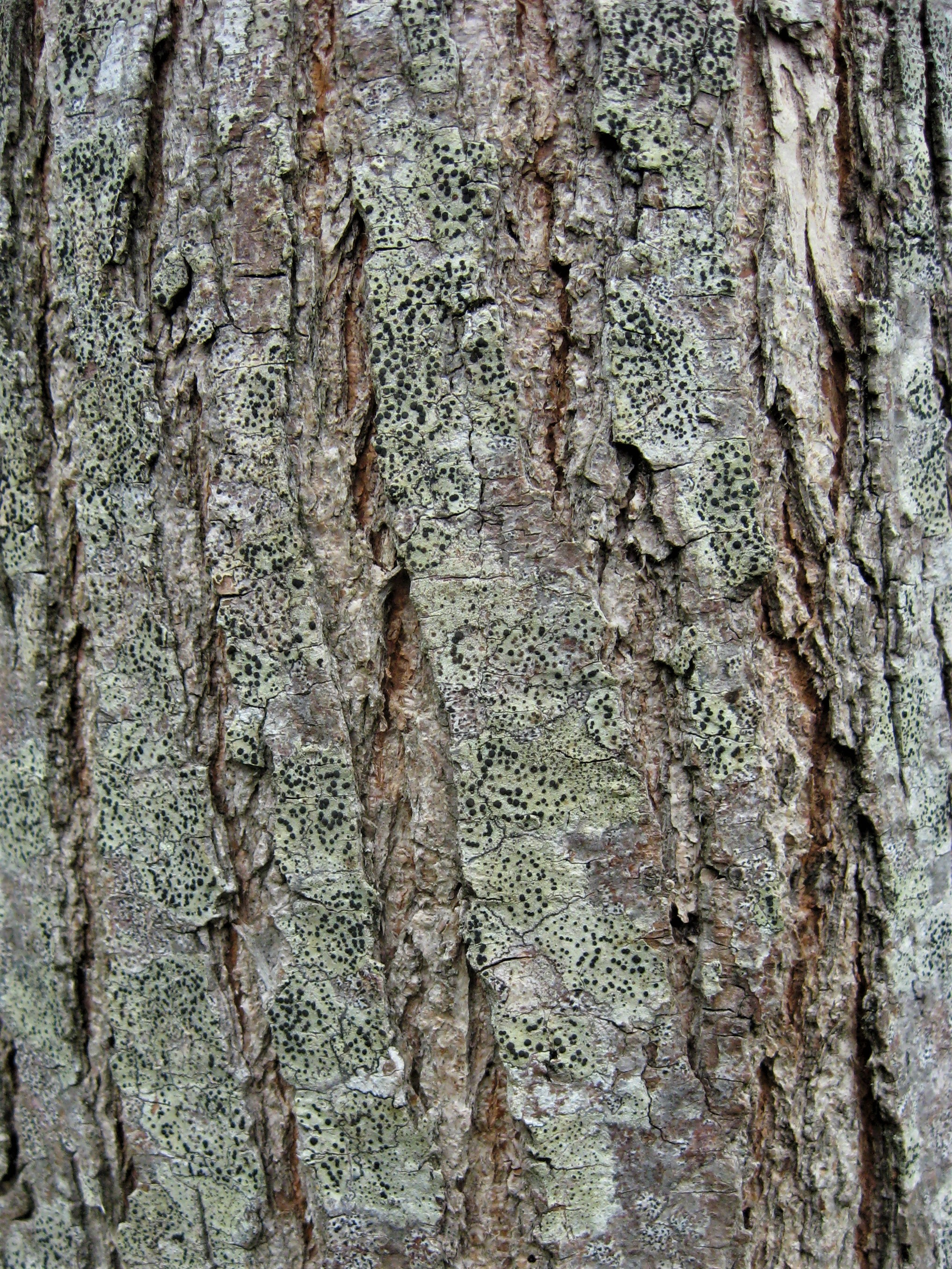
Bark of 20-year-old tree

== Pests and diseases ==
'Plinio' has a very high resistance to Dutch elm disease. In trials conducted by the Istituto per la Protezione delle Piante, Florence, 'Plinio' sustained 7.8% defoliation and 3.9% dieback when inoculated with unnaturally high concentrations of the fungal pathogen, compared with 50% / 35.5% resp. for 'Lobel', and 95% / 100% for 'CNR118', a Field Elm (Ulmus minor) native to Italy.

== Cultivation ==
Fast growing (though slower than its stablemate 'San Zanobi') in Italy, where it commences flowering in its third year. The tree was introduced to the UK by Butterfly Conservation in 2004 and is being evaluated at several sites in Hampshire, where it has been found to be particularly successful on thin dry rendzinas. However, on more fertile soils, the relatively sparse and splaying top growth often exceeds stem and root development.

As of 1 January 2018, the importation of 'Plinio' into the UK from Italy is prohibited, the plant unable to qualify for a phytopassport owing to the prevalence of elm yellows in the region of cultivation. However, as of 2025, IPP have waived patent restrictions and thus the tree may now be freely propagated in the UK.

Specimens of the cultivar have been planted in the Netherlands, notably among the line of 140 elms on the ‘s-Gravelandsevaartweg, Loosdrecht (ten trees at the southern end, planted 2014), part of Wijdemeren City Council's elm collection, assembled since 2003 by tree manager Martin Tijdgat and his colleagues.

'Plinio' is not known (2016) to have been introduced to North America or Australasia.

== Etymology ==
'Plinio' is named for the early Roman scientist Pliny the Elder (Plinio in Italian).

== Accessions ==
=== Europe ===
- Grange Farm Arboretum, Lincolnshire, UK. Acc. no. 694.
- Great Fontley Farm, Fareham, UK. Butterfly Conservation Elm Trials plantation, Home Field (planted 2004).
- Royal Botanic Garden Edinburgh, UK. Acc. no. 20042083
- Sir Harold Hillier Gardens, Romsey, UK. Acc. no. 2004.0936

== Nurseries ==
=== Europe ===
- UmbraFlor , Spello, Italy.
