= Ulmus 'San Zanobi' =

Elm cultivar

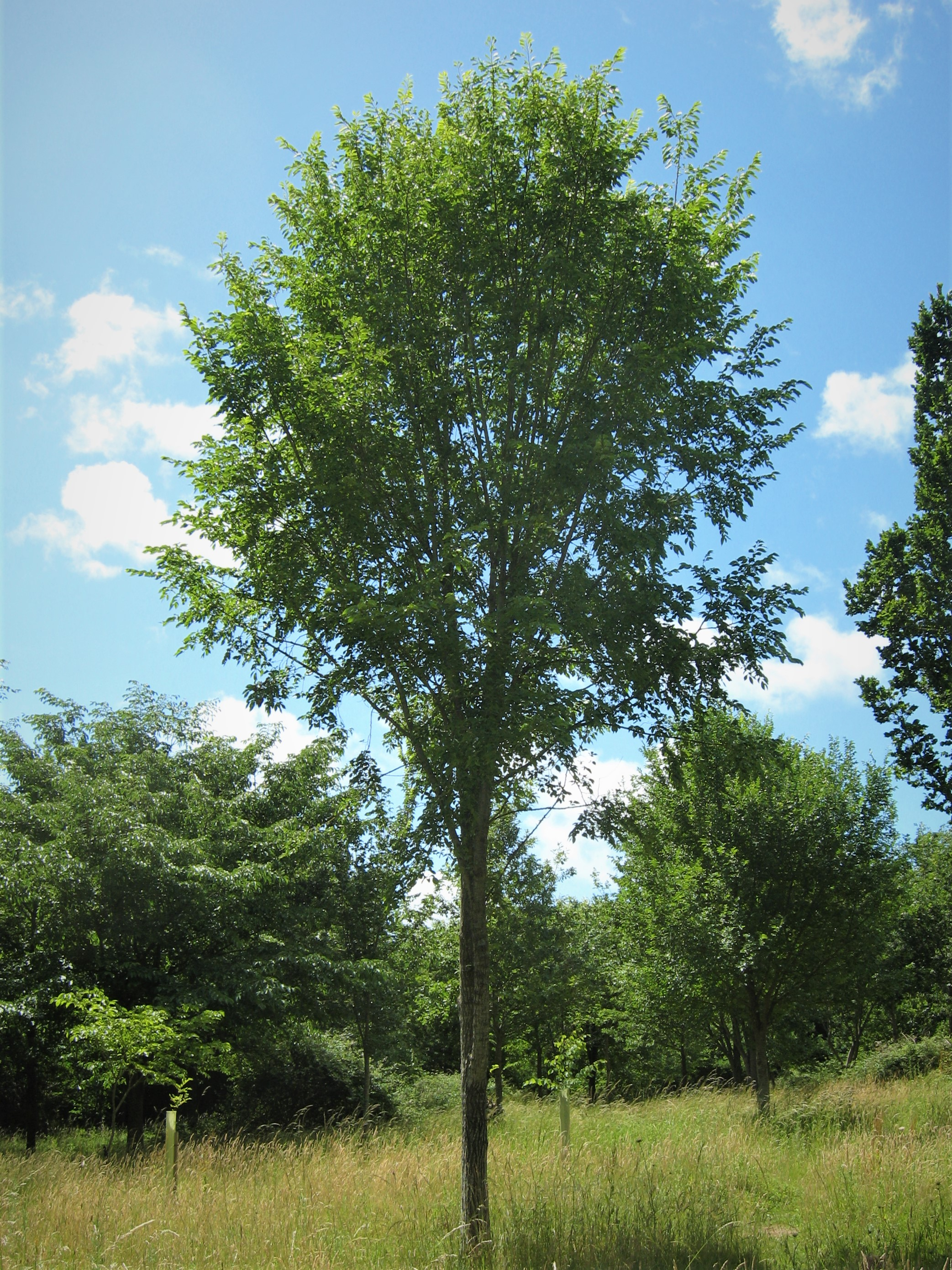
- 'San Zanobi', Great Fontley, UK
- Genus: Ulmus
- Hybrid parentage: 'Plantyn' × U. pumila 'S 15'
- Cultivar: 'San Zanobi'
- Origin: IPP, Florence, Italy

Ulmus 'San Zanobi' is a hybrid elm cultivar raised by the Istituto per la Protezione delle Piante (IPP) in Florence, from a crossing of the Dutch hybrid 'Plantyn' (female parent) and the Siberian Elm Ulmus pumila clone 'S 15'; it was released to commerce in 2002. 'San Zanobi' was introduced to the UK in 2004 by Hampshire & Isle of Wight Branch, Butterfly Conservation, as part of its assessment of DED-resistant cultivars as potential hosts of the endangered White-letter Hairstreak.

== Description ==
'San Zanobi' is a fastigiate, often monopodial tree with upright branching bearing glabrous, bright green leaves < 15 cm long × < 6 cm broad. Like its compatriot 'Plinio', the tree lacks striking autumn colours, the leaves remaining green almost until they fall in late November. In Italy, 'San Zanobi' begins flowering in its fifth year (sixth in the UK), and can begin suckering from roots at about the same age. The perfect, apetalous wind-pollinated flowers appear in mid March in the UK. The sessile samarae are round to ovate, typically 15 × 18 mm.

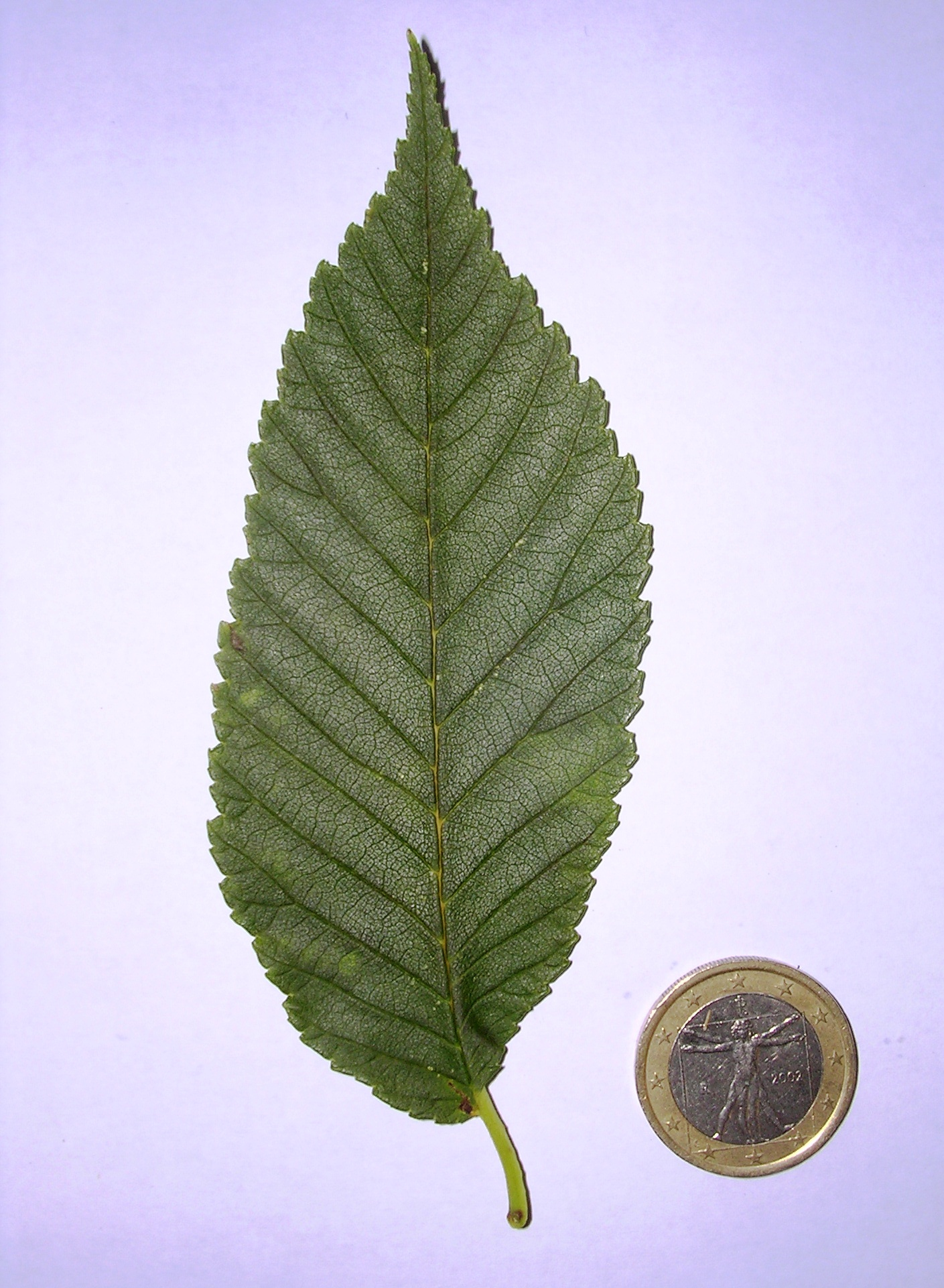
'San Zanobi' leaf, and 1 Euro coin

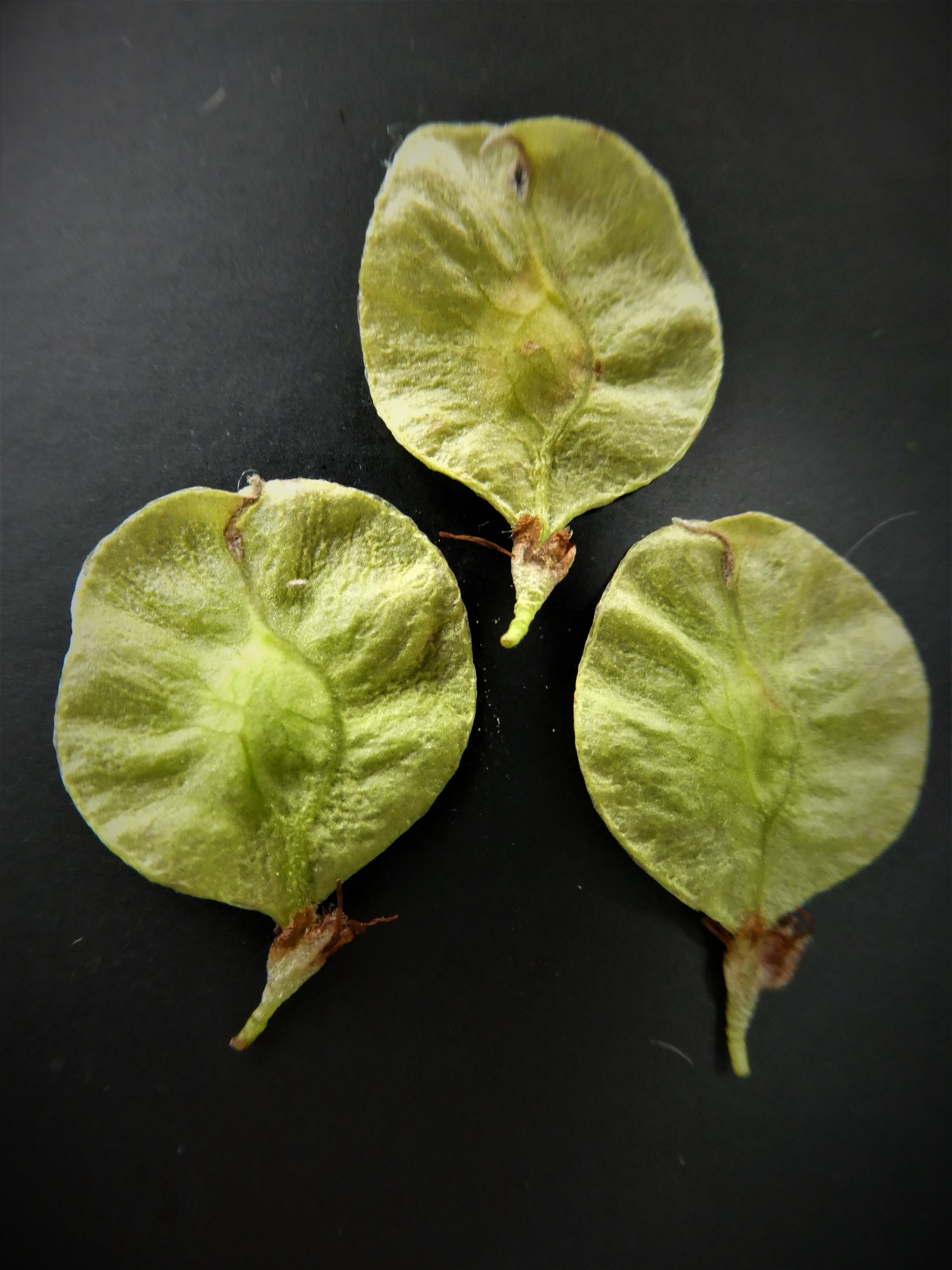
Samarae

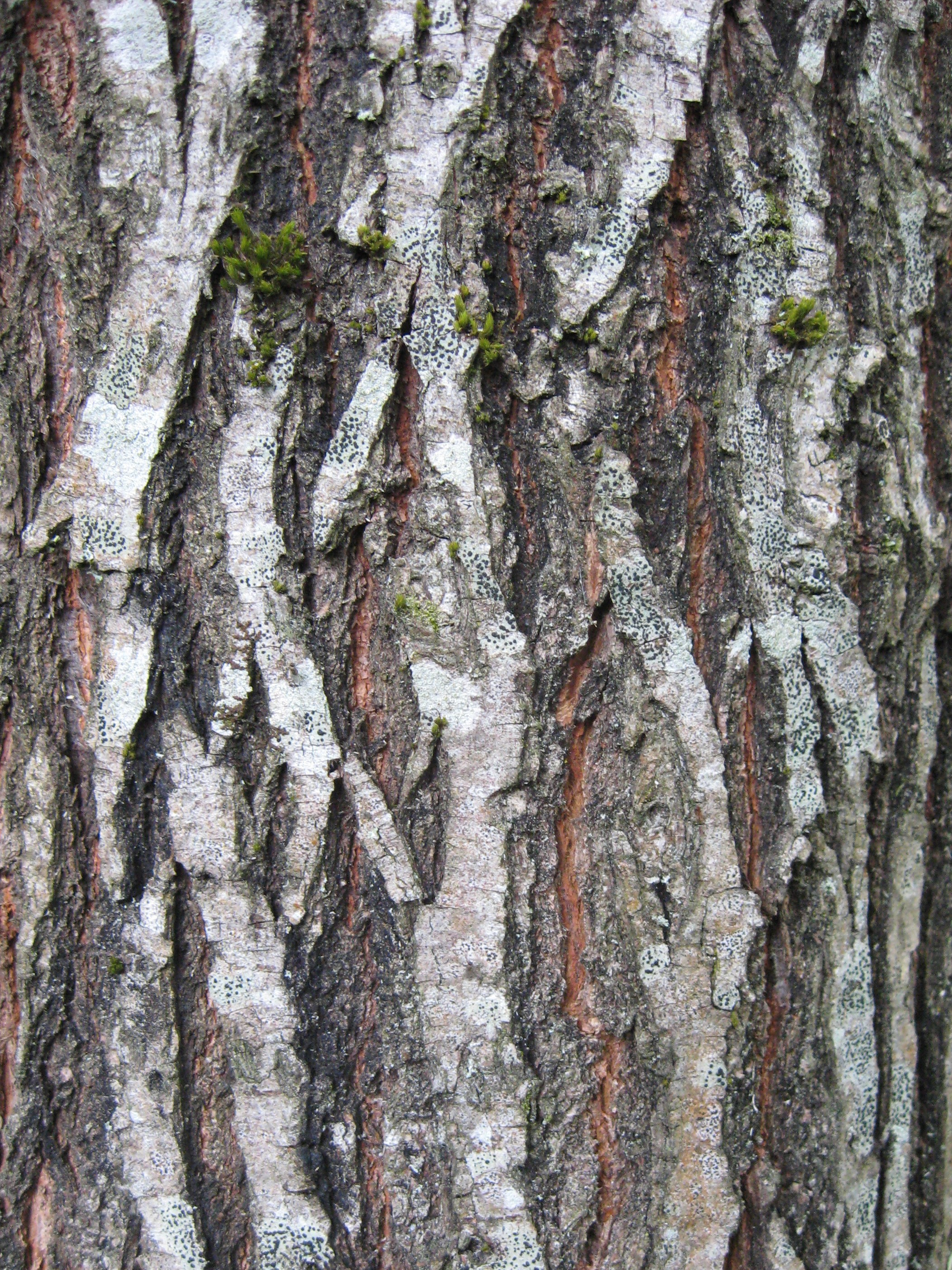
Bark of 20-year-old tree

== Pests and diseases ==
'San Zanobi' has a high resistance to Dutch elm disease, and no losses to the disease have been observed. In trials conducted by the Istituto per la Protezione delle Piante, 'San Zanobi' sustained 19.5% defoliation and 8.5% dieback when inoculated with unnaturally high concentrations of the fungal pathogen, compared with 50% / 35.5% resp. for 'Lobel', and 95% / 100% for 'CNR118', a field elm (Ulmus minor) native to Italy.

== Cultivation ==
'San Zanobi' has been widely planted across Italy, mostly in towns and cities, notably Rome in and around the Villa Medici. Introduced to the UK by Butterfly Conservation in 2004, it was evaluated at several sites in Hampshire, where it has proven fast growing, increasing in height by up to 0.87 m and 1.45 cm stem diameter per annum. However, it was found to be intolerant of soils waterlogged over winter. Among urban introductions in the UK are two specimens, planted in 2014, towards the west end of Broad Walk, Christ Church Meadow, Oxford.

As of 1 January 2018, the export of 'San Zanobi' to the UK from Italy is prohibited, the plant unable to qualify for a phytopassport owing to the prevalence of elm yellows in the region of cultivation. However, as of 2025, IPP have waived patent restrictions, and thus the tree may be freely propagated in the UK.

Specimens of the cultivar have been planted in the Netherlands, notably among the line of 140 elms on the ‘s-Gravelandsevaartweg, Loosdrecht (ten trees at the northern end, south of the 'Lobel', planted 2016), part of Wijdemeren City Council's elm collection, assembled since 2003 by tree manager Martin Tijdgat and his colleagues.

'San Zanobi' is not known to have been introduced to North America or Australasia.

== Etymology ==
The cultivar is named after Saint Zenobius (San Zanobi in Italian), a saint noted for many miracles. After his death in AD 417, his body, whilst being carried from the cathedral for burial, is supposed to have glanced a dead elm, restoring the tree to life.

== Accessions ==
Europe

- Grange Farm Arboretum, Lincolnshire, UK. Acc. no. 694.
- Great Fontley Farm, Fareham, UK. Butterfly Conservation Elm Trials plantation, Home Field. Two whips planted 2004.
- Royal Botanic Garden Edinburgh, UK. Acc. nos. 20090116, 20090402, 20180331
- Sir Harold Hillier Gardens, Romsey, UK. One specimen in Plant Centre Field. Acc. no. 2004.0440.
