= Istituto per la Protezione delle Piante =

The Istituto per la Protezione delle Piante (IPP), or 'Institute of Plant Protection', is part of the Food Department of the Consiglio Nazionale delle Ricerche (CNR; "Italian National Research Council"), an Italian government organization with the aim of supporting scientific and technological research. IPP has four bases in Italy: Turin, Florence, Portici, and Bari.

The mission of IPP is the study of stress factors in plants, to identify resistance mechanisms and methods of defence against biotic and abiotic stress protection in order to improve the quality and quantity of agricultural food production in a sustainable and environmentally friendly manner. The activities of IPP are divided into five orders:

- Biodiversity of hosts, pathogens, vectors, pests and symbiotic fungi in the rhizosphere.
- Host-organism-environment interaction: biology, epidemiology and functional genomics.
- Research and development of innovative strategies to fight for protection of plants.
- Economic impact and environmental stress factors on plants and ecosystems agroforestry production.
- Structure and functioning of terrestrial ecosystems.

The IPP station in Florence is renowned for raising elm cultivars resistant to Dutch elm disease, several of which are now in commerce in western Europe.
