= CPGA =

CPGA may stand for:

- Ceramic pin grid array, a kind of a package for integrated circuits
- Cornish Pilot Gig Association
