= Ulmus minor 'Stricta' =

Elm cultivar

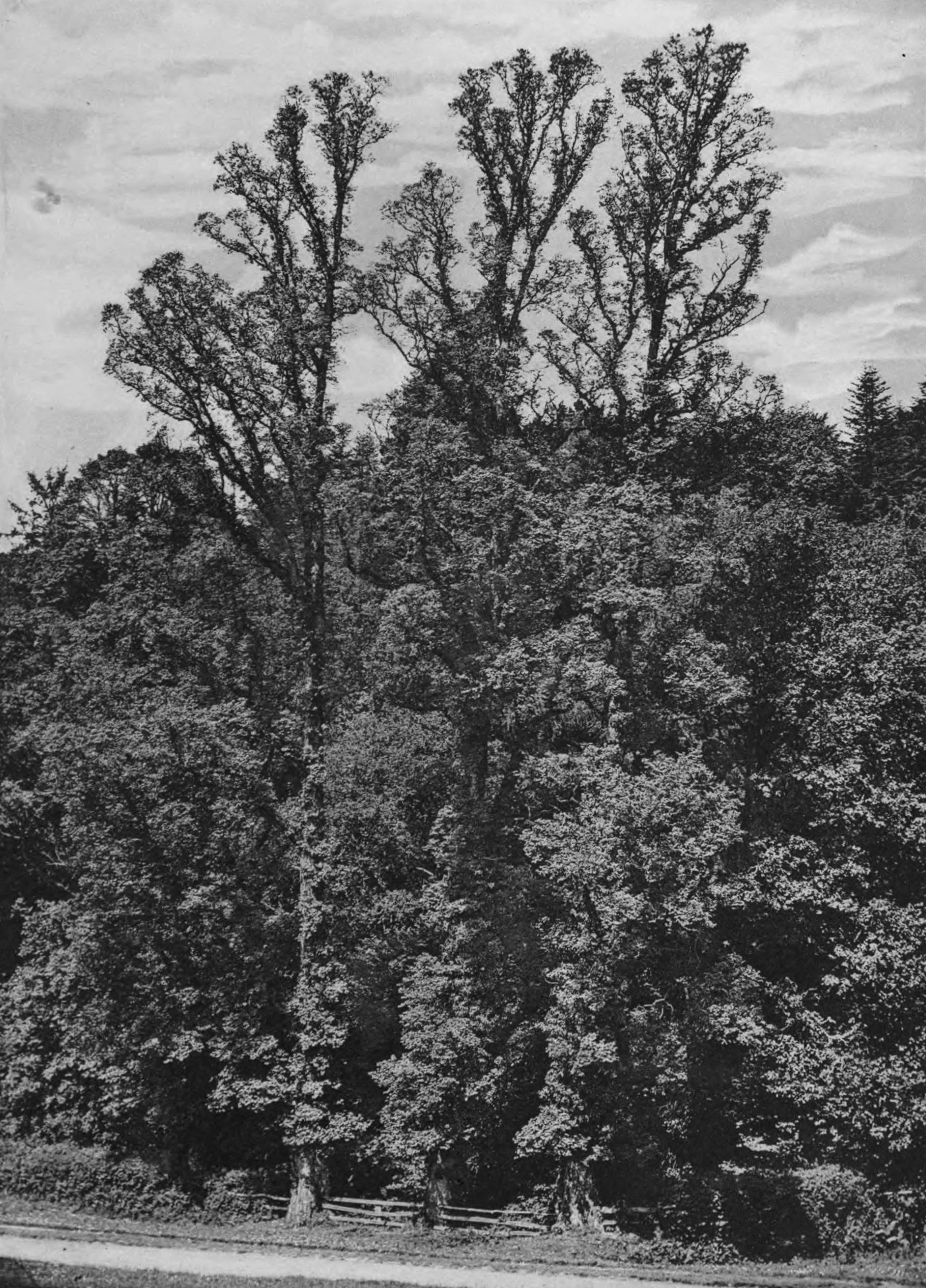
- U. minor 'Stricta', Coldrenick, Cornwall, before 1913
- Species: Ulmus minor
- Cultivar: 'Stricta'
- Origin: England

The field elm cultivar Ulmus minor 'Stricta', known as Cornish elm, was commonly found in South West England (Cornwall and West Devon), Brittany, and south-west Ireland, until the arrival of Dutch elm disease in the late 1960s. The origin of Cornish elm in the south-west of Britain remains a matter of contention. It is commonly assumed to have been introduced from Brittany. It is also considered possible that the tree may have survived the ice ages on lands to the south of Cornwall long since lost to the sea. Henry thought it "probably native in the south of Ireland". Dr Max Coleman of Royal Botanic Garden Edinburgh, arguing in his 2002 paper on British elms that there was no clear distinction between species and subspecies, suggested that known or suspected clones of Ulmus minor, once cultivated and named, should be treated as cultivars, preferred the designation U. minor 'Stricta' to Ulmus minor var. stricta. The DNA of 'Stricta' has been investigated and the cultivar is now known to be a clone.

Mature trees labelled 'Cornish elm' are now largely restricted to Australia and New Zealand, where they were introduced in the 19th century (but see 'Stricta'-like cultivars below).

== Description ==
Growing to a height of up to 27 metres (89 ft) in sheltered situations (in exposed situations it is usually half the size), the Cornish elm is a slender, slow-growing deciduous tree, distinguished by its long, straight trunk, which culminates in a narrow fan-shaped crown comprising short, straight, ascending branches. The leaves are small, obovate to oval, typically acuminate at the apex, 6 cm long by 3.5 cm broad, with a dark-green upper surface, glossy and smooth. The perfect apetalous wind-pollinated flowers occur in clusters of 15–20 on very short pedicels. The samarae rarely ripen in England, but when mature are very similar to those of others in the field elm group, being mostly obovate, 16 mm long by 10 mm broad. A survey of Cornish elms in County Cork, Ireland (2007), found some variation in smoothness or roughness of leaf-surface and in basal asymmetry.

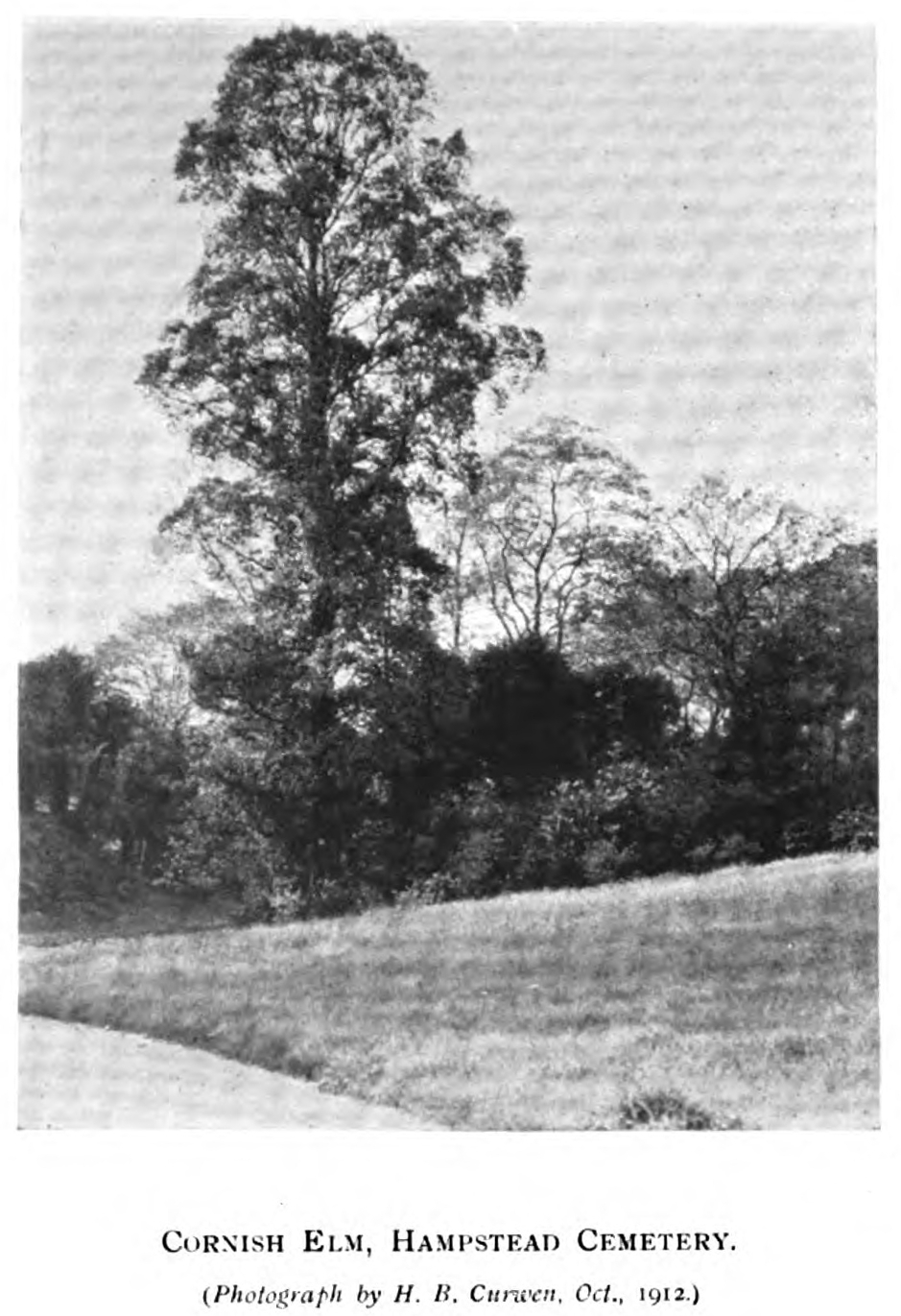
Cornish elm, Hampstead Cemetery, 1912

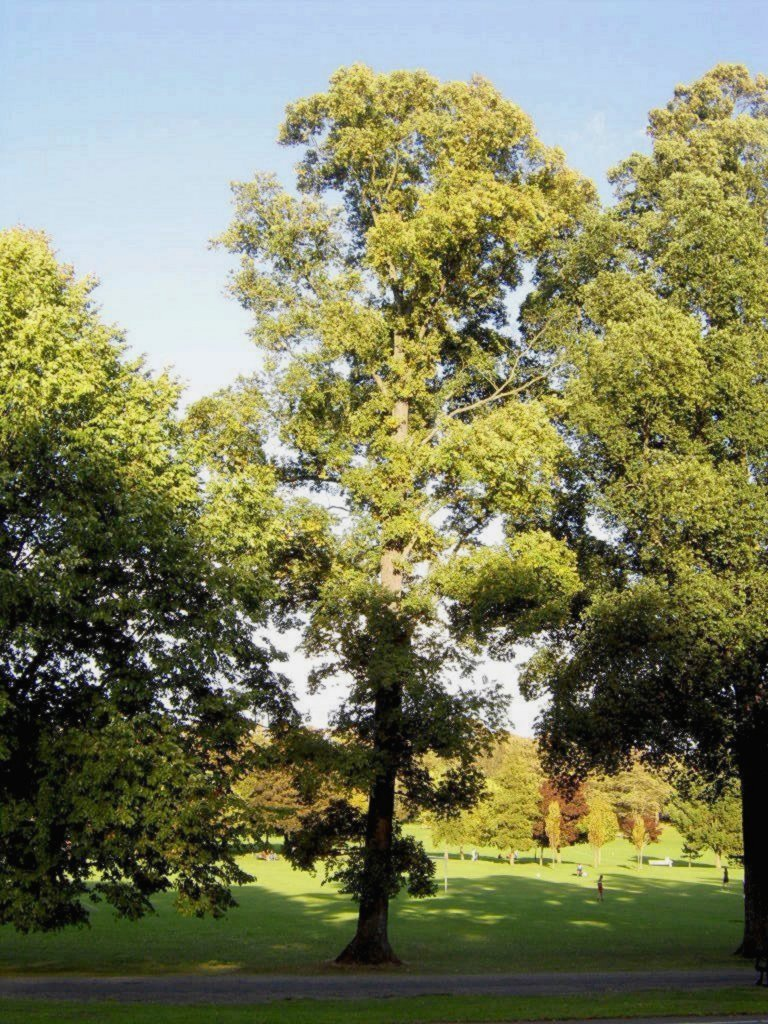
Cornish elm in Preston Park, Brighton, 2005

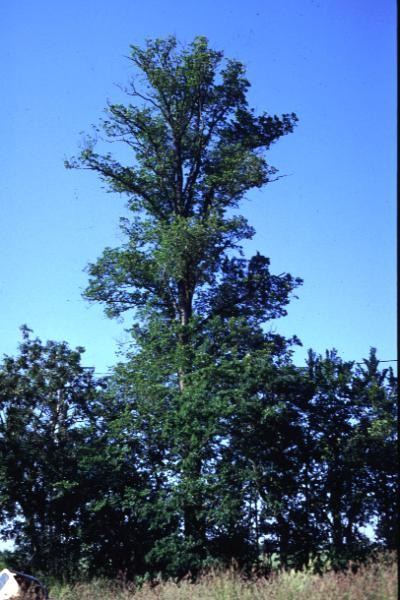
'Stricta', Finistère, France, 1996

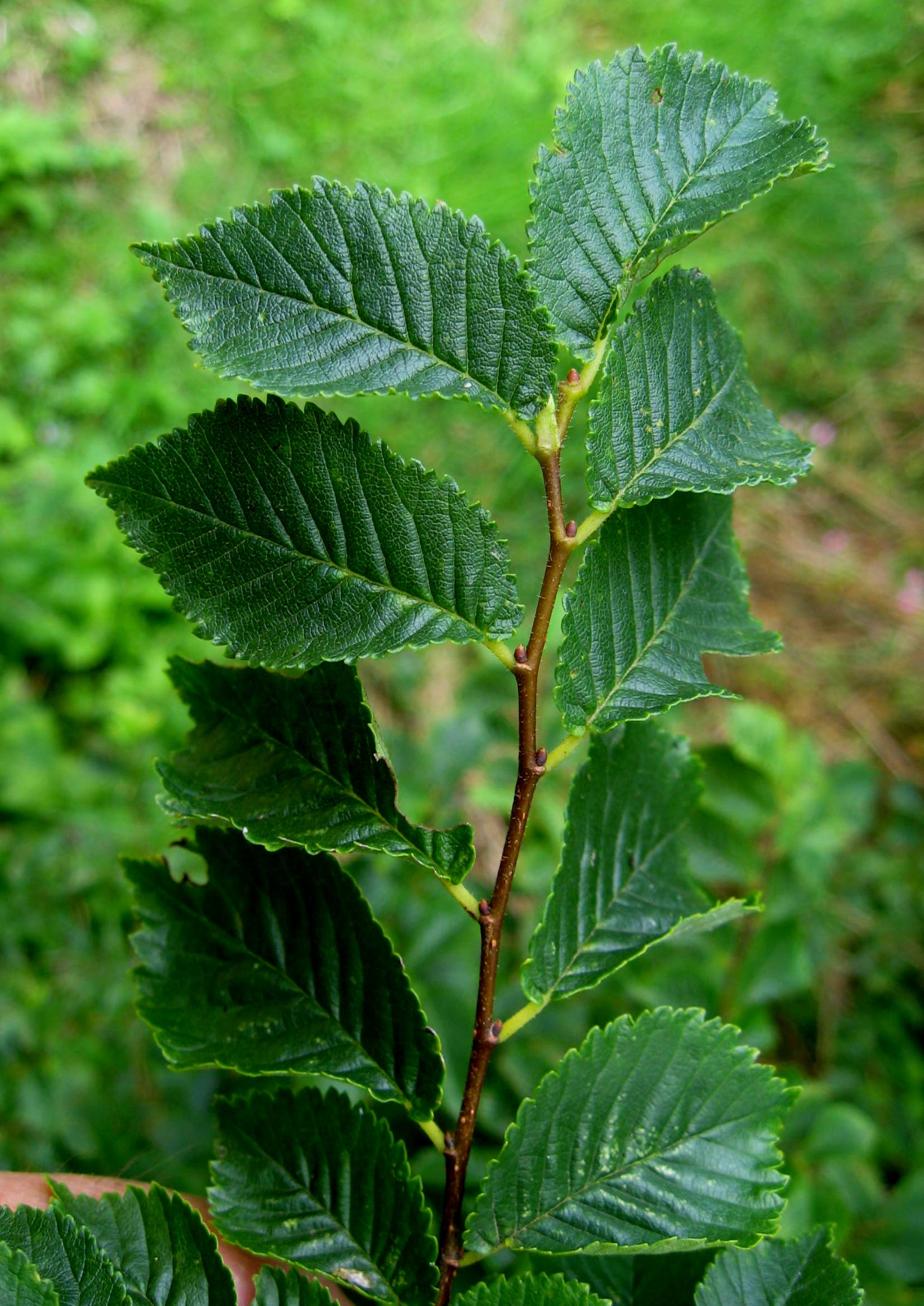
Long-shoot leaves of Cornish elm, Penhalvean, Cornwall

Dr Oliver Rackham (1986) noted that Cornish elms with "more spreading" crowns grow around Truro and on the Lizard Peninsula, illustrating the variety, which he called 'Lizard Elm', with a 1980 photograph. The large old specimen of Cornish elm in Castletownbere Cemetery in County Cork, Ireland (see 'Notable trees' below) matches Rackham's description and photograph of his 'Lizard Elm'.

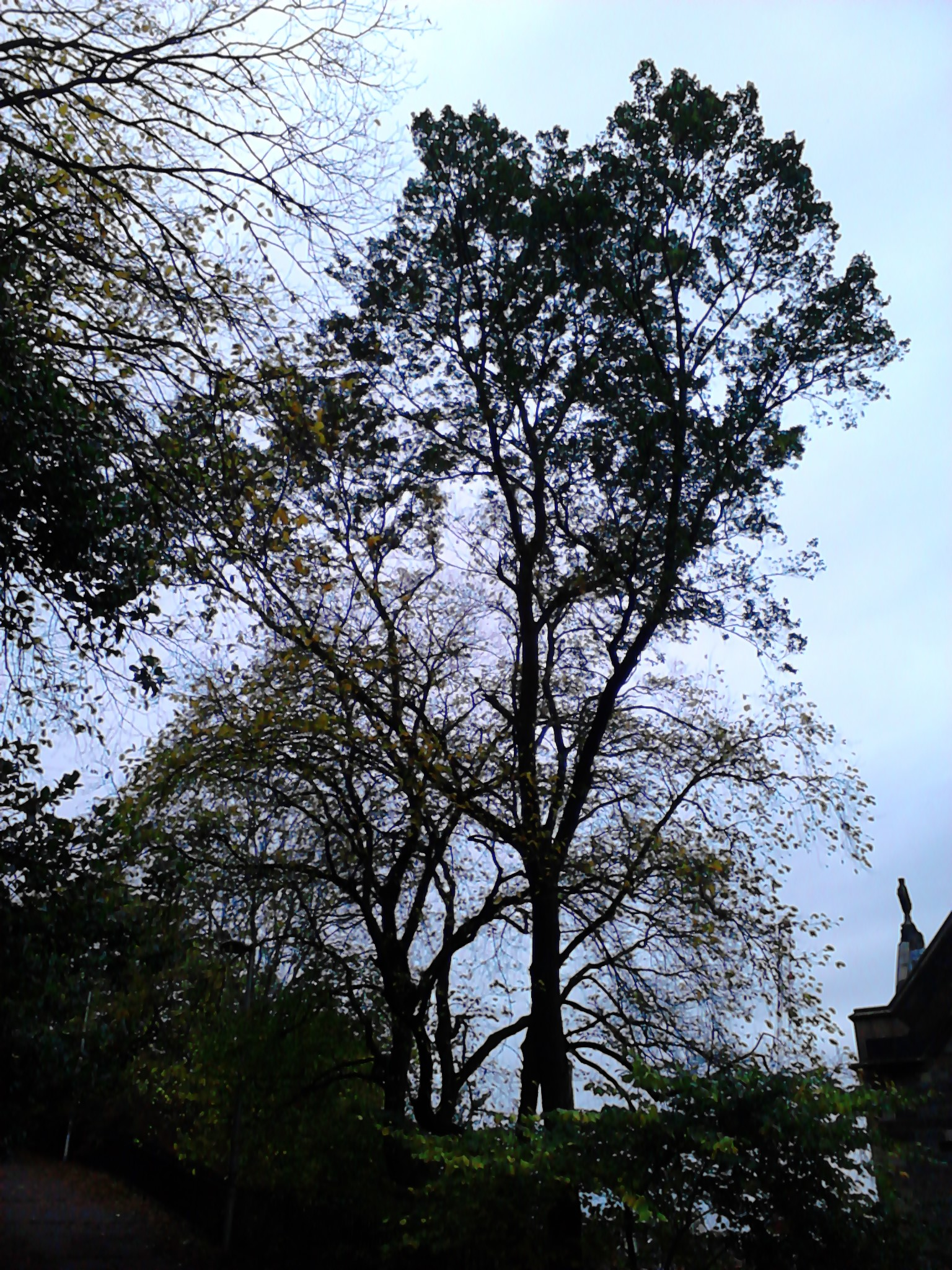
More spreading form of Cornish elm, Calton Hill Park, Edinburgh

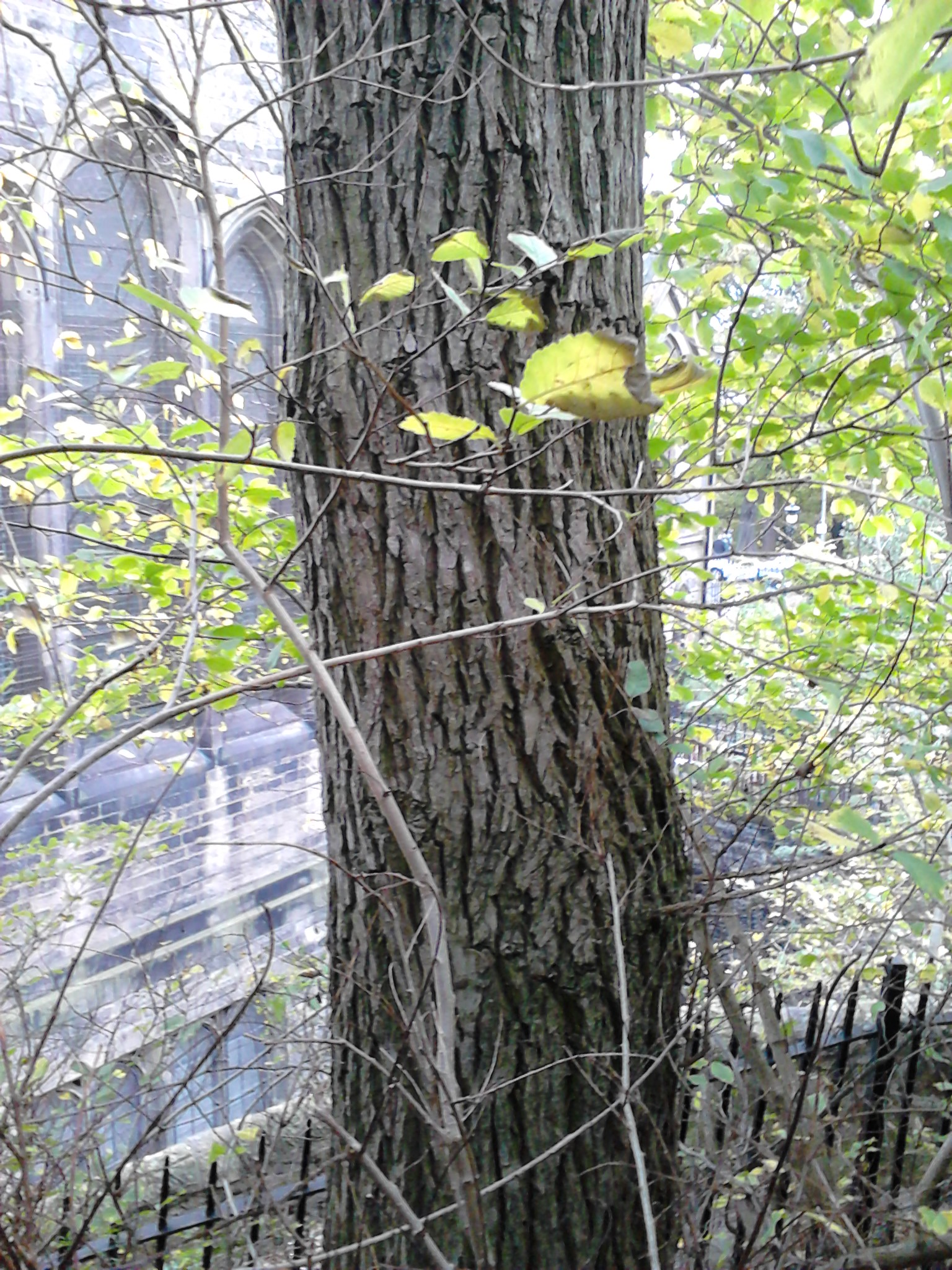
Bark of Cornish elm, Calton Hill Park, Edinburgh

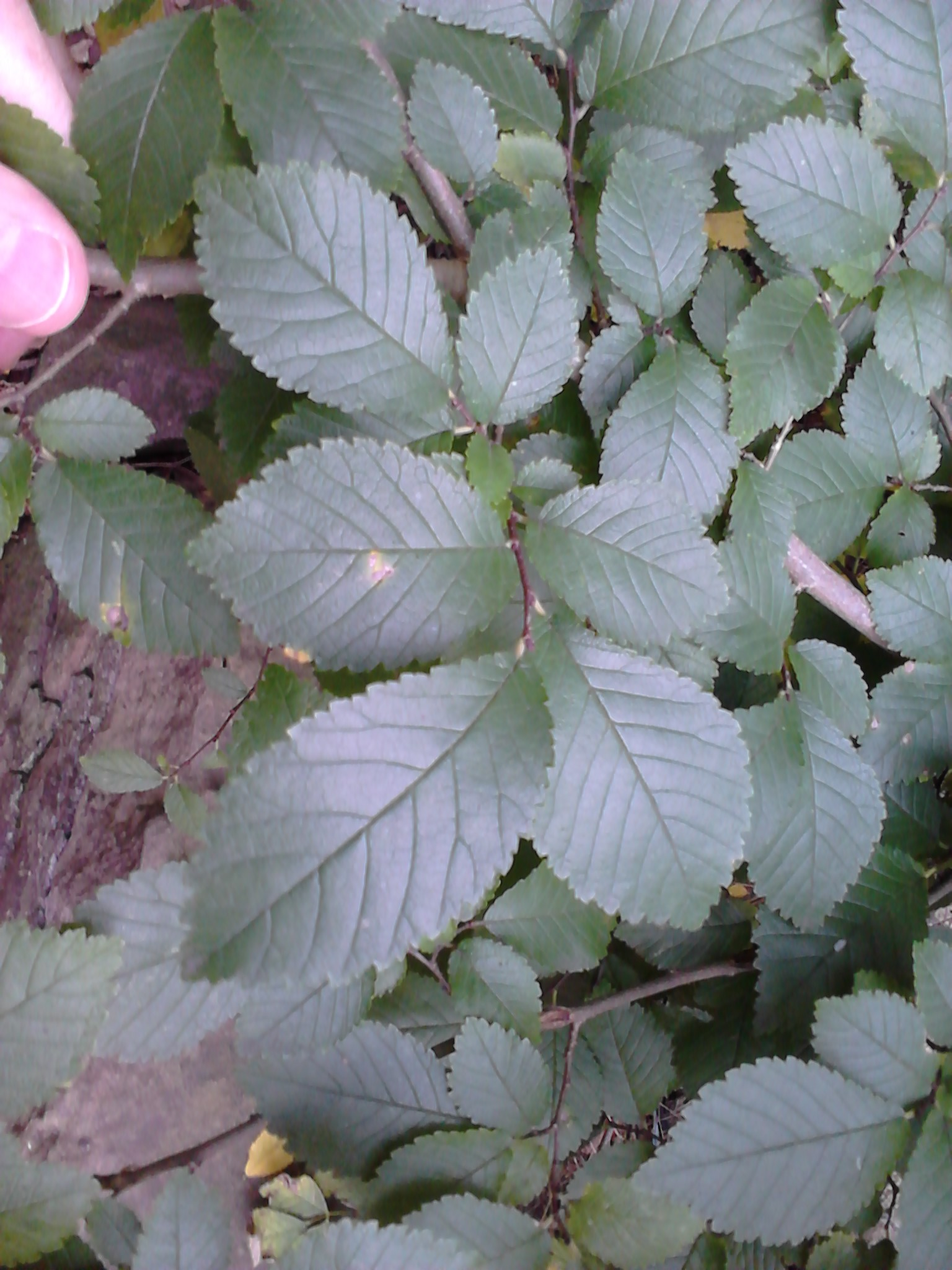
Short-shoot root-sucker leaves of Cornish elm, Calton Hill Park, Edinburgh

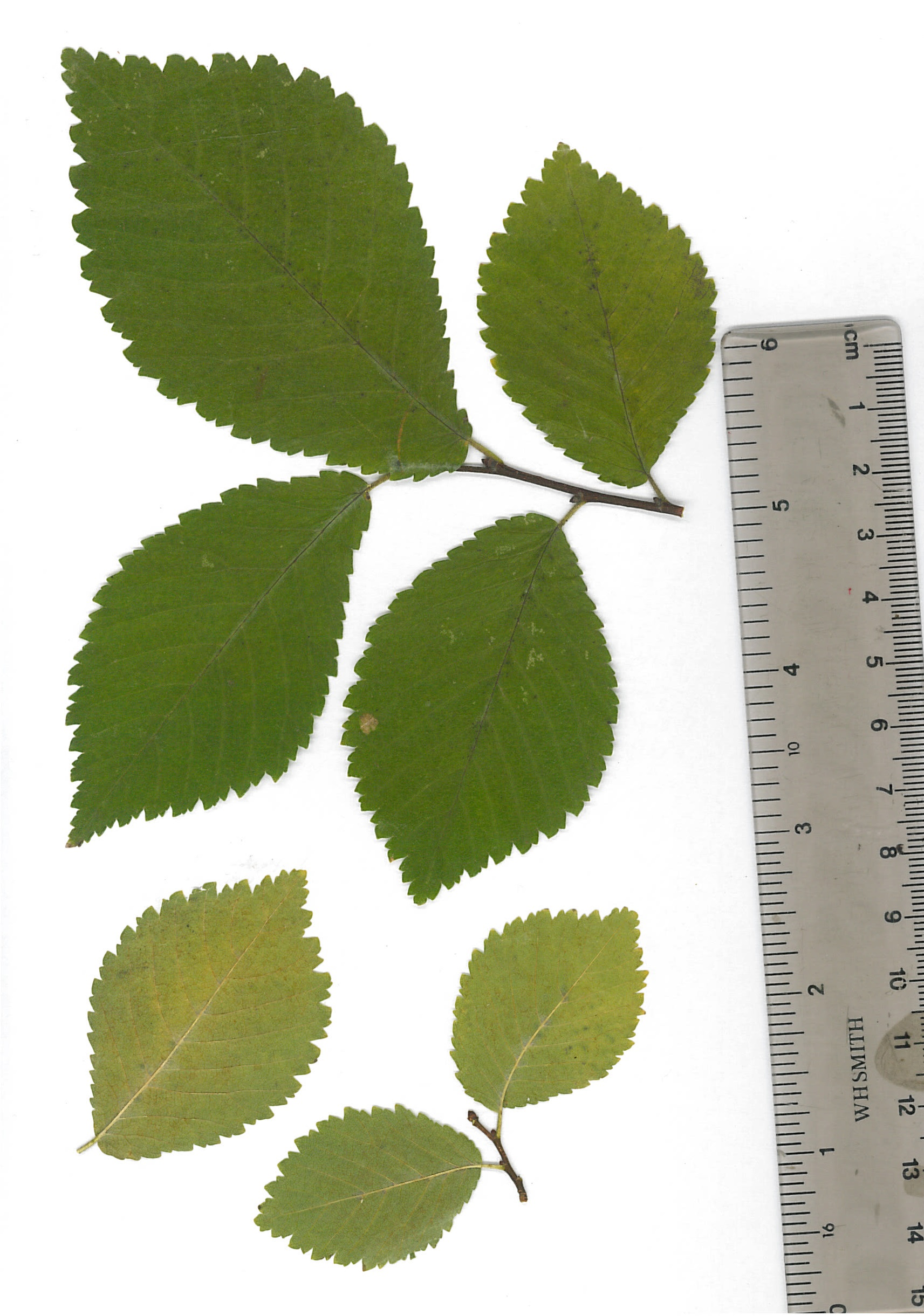
Short-shoot root-sucker leaves of Cornish elm, Edinburgh

== Pests and diseases ==
Cornish elm is very susceptible to Dutch elm disease, but suckers remain a common component of hedgerows in parts of Cornwall, and thus the genetic resources of this cultivar are not considered endangered. Like other field elms, propagation is almost entirely by suckers, which the tree produces copiously.

== Cultivation and uses ==
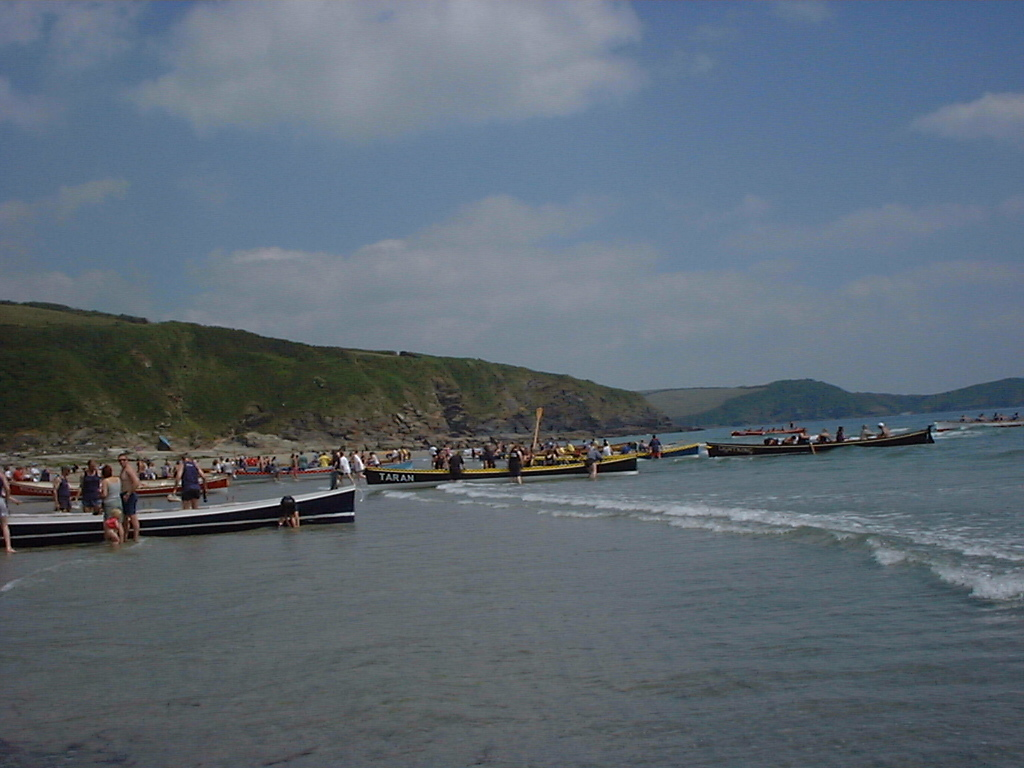
Pilot gigs made from Cornish elm returning from a race at Mevagissey, 2001

Cornish elm was traditionally considered the best shelter-belt tree along the Cornish coast. Its timber was much prized for its strength, and was commonly used in wheel and wagon construction. Working Cornish pilot gigs were traditionally built from Cornish elm: the Rules of the Cornish Pilot Gig Association specified that to take part in gig races the boat should be made from "Cornish narrow-leaved elm". Ley (1910) described Cornish elm as "abundant in Brittany, very abundant in West Cornwall, becoming less abundant in East Cornwall and West Devon". Cornish elm was later cultivated as an ornamental tree in parts of southern England and southern Ireland, and, more rarely, in UK urban plantings. Hillier & Sons nursery, Winchester, Hampshire, was among the nurseries that supplied it, carefully distinguishing it from Wheatley elm. The locations of notable plantings of Cornish elm, both in Cornwall and beyond, are listed in Henry (1913), Richens (1983), and Mitchell (1996).

Few mature specimens are known to survive in the wild in England. Only one is known in Cornwall (see under 'Notable trees'), while about 18 reputedly grow in the Brighton & Hove enclave. Another two have been reported (2009) from East Sussex at Selmeston, near the footpath across the grounds of Sherrington Manor. Two specimens survive in Edinburgh (2019), an old tree in Dean Gardens, and a younger by Greenside Church, Calton Hill.

The Wheatley or Guernsey elm (Ulmus minor 'Sarniensis') was often misnamed "Cornish elm" in the UK by the local authorities who planted it extensively. Introduced to the US, Ulmus campestris cornubiensis, 'Cornish elm', appeared from the 1860s in catalogues of the Mount Hope Nursery (also known as Ellwanger and Barry) of Rochester, New York, later catalogues distinguishing it from Wheatley Elm. Cornish Elm also appeared separately from Wheatley Elm in the catalogues of the Brown Brothers' Nursery and the Perry Nursery Co. of Rochester, N.Y.

For so-called Cornish elm in Australia, see 'Stricta'-like cultivars below.

== Notable trees ==
The Great Elm of Rosuic, an ancient pollard elm which attained a d.b.h. of over 2.5 metres (8.2 ft) before succumbing to disease, continues to produce suckers.

As of 2011, the Woodland Trust lists only one verified mature Cornish elm surviving in Cornwall, a specimen 1.89 metres (6.2 ft) in girth at Tregoose near Helston. A large specimen with a forked trunk stands in Castletownbere Cemetery in County Cork, Ireland, with a bole-girth (2007) of 450 cm (making it about 150 years old), a height of 25 m and a crown diameter of 20 m, along with a small number of younger Cornish elms with an average d.b.h. of 143 cm.

== Synonymy ==
- U. cornubiensis Weston (1770)
- U. nitens var. stricta Aiton (1789)
- U. stricta Lindley (1829)
- U. campestris var. cornubiensis Loudon (1838)
- ?U. reticulata Dumort. stricta Dumort.
- U. carpinifolia var. cornubiensis

== Varieties ==
An Ulmus stricta parvifolia, a "less common" form of Cornish elm, was described by Lindley in A Synopsis of British Flora, arranged according to the Natural Order (1829), from trees in Cornwall and North Devon, with "leaves much smaller" than Cornish elm, "less oblique at the base, finely and regularly crenate" and "acuminate" rather than, as in Cornish elm, "cuspidate". Melville considered Goodyer's elm a variety of Cornish elm. Some nurseries listed 'Dickson's Golden Elm' as form of Cornish elm.

== Hybrids ==
It has been suggested that the cultivar 'Daveyi' is a natural hybrid of Wych elm and Cornish elm; likewise 'Exoniensis'. F. J. Fontaine conjectured that the cultivar Ulmus 'Purpurea' is related to the Cornish elm.

== 'Stricta'-like elms ==
An U. campestris cornubiensis (syn. U. glabra cornubiensis) was distributed by the Späth nursery, Berlin, in the late 19th century and early 20th. Henry stated that the "beautiful narrow pyramidal tree" he had seen by that name in Späth's nursery differed from true Cornish elm, bearing instead "leaves similar in size and appearance to a common form of U. nitens" [:U. minor]. One specimen of Späth's U. campestris cornubiensis was supplied to the Dominion Arboretum, Ottawa, Canada in 1897, and three to the Royal Botanic Garden Edinburgh in 1902, one being planted in the Garden proper and cultivated as U. stricta, the other two being planted in the city. In 1958 Melville likewise queried Späth's Cornish elm (see External links below, herbarium specimen E00824799); Edward Kemp, however, RBGE curator (1950–71), accepted it. A specimen of what appears from herbarium specimens to be the same clone survives (2016) in Edinburgh (height about 25 m, girth about 2 m), in Douglas Crescent Gardens. The latter also matches an 1825 herbarium specimen labelled "U. suberosa var., Hort. Millburn".

Späth's U. campestris cornubiensis, Royal Botanic Garden Edinburgh

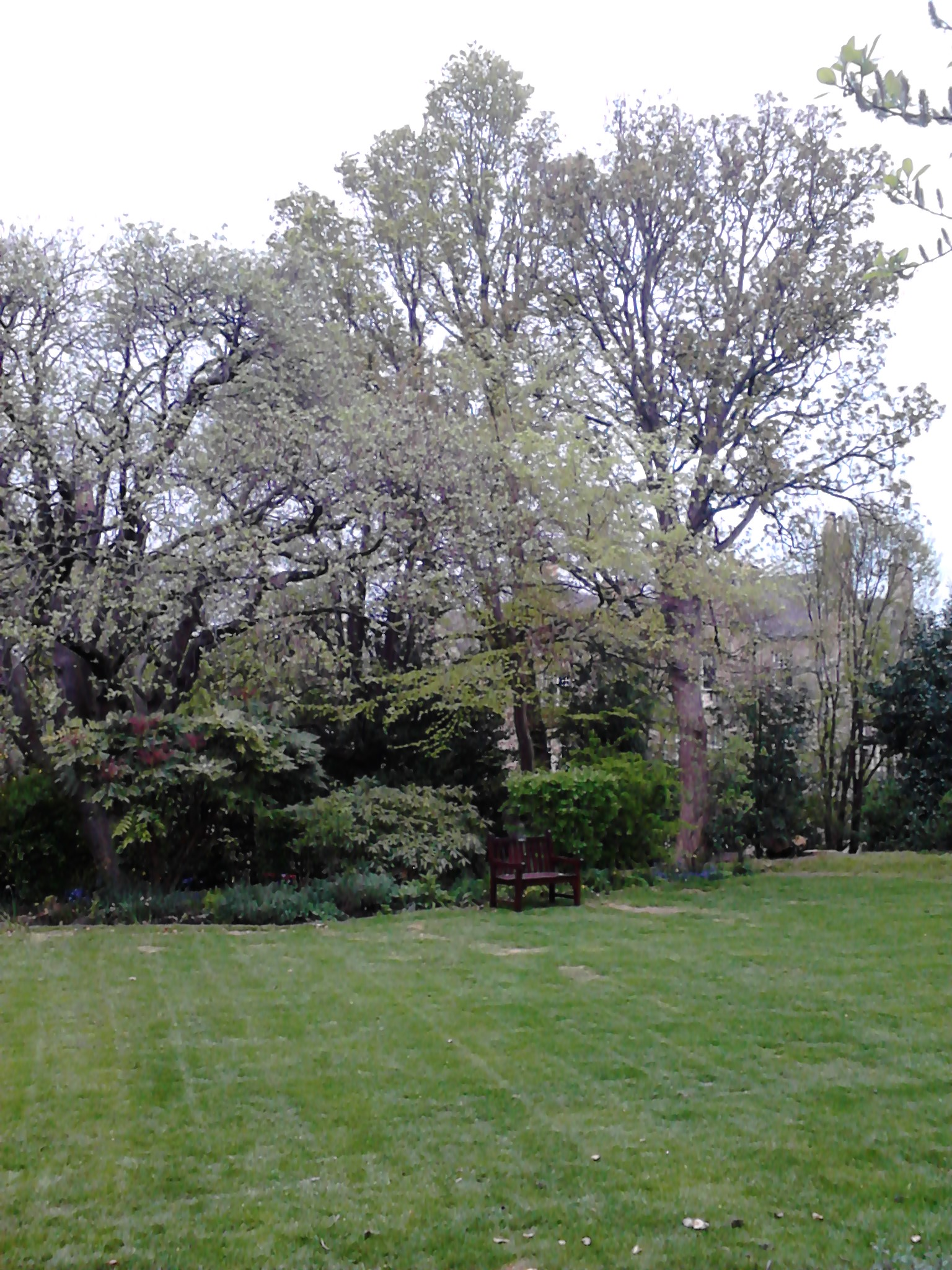
Douglas Crescent Gardens elm, Edinburgh

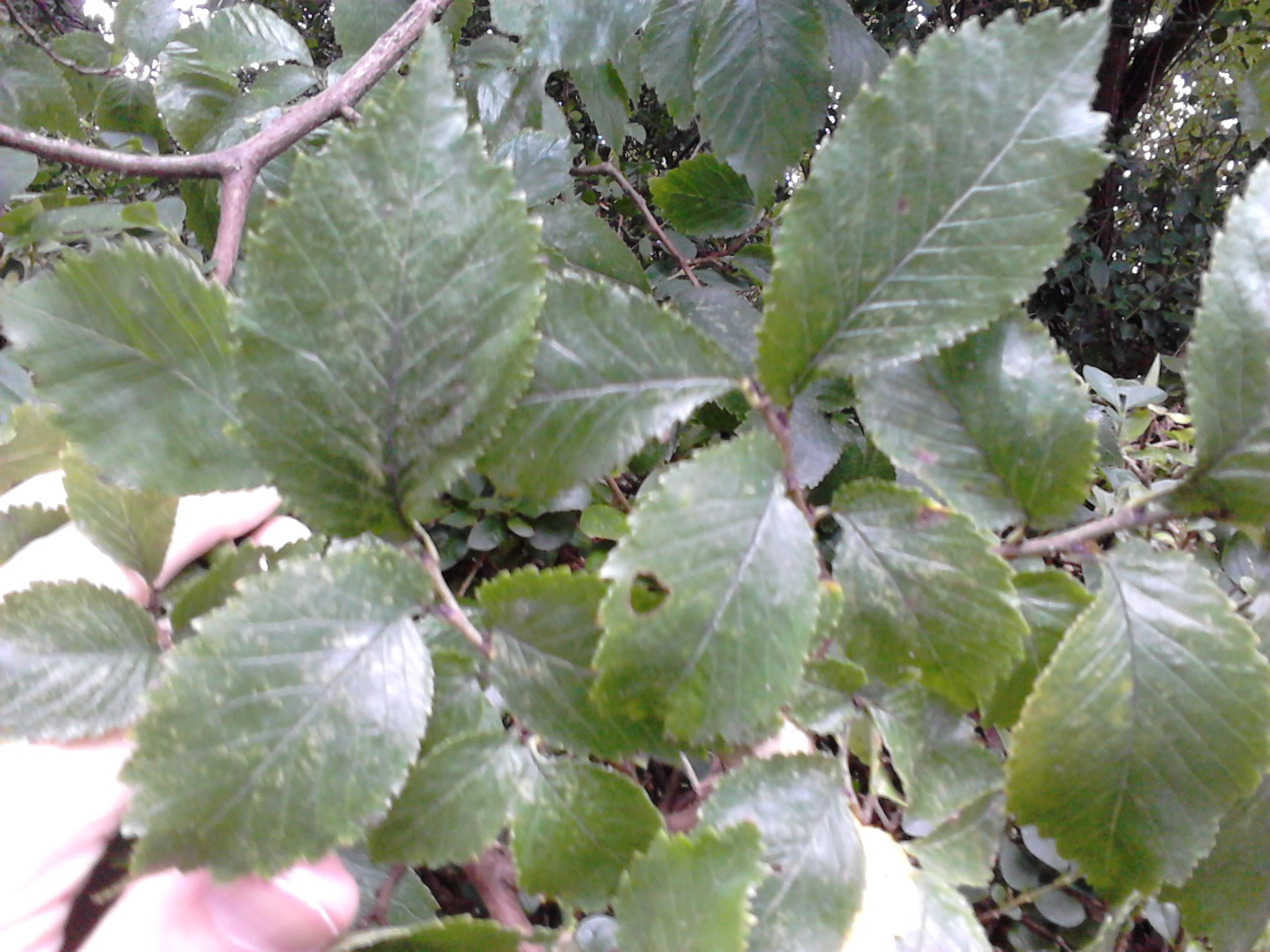
Leaves of same

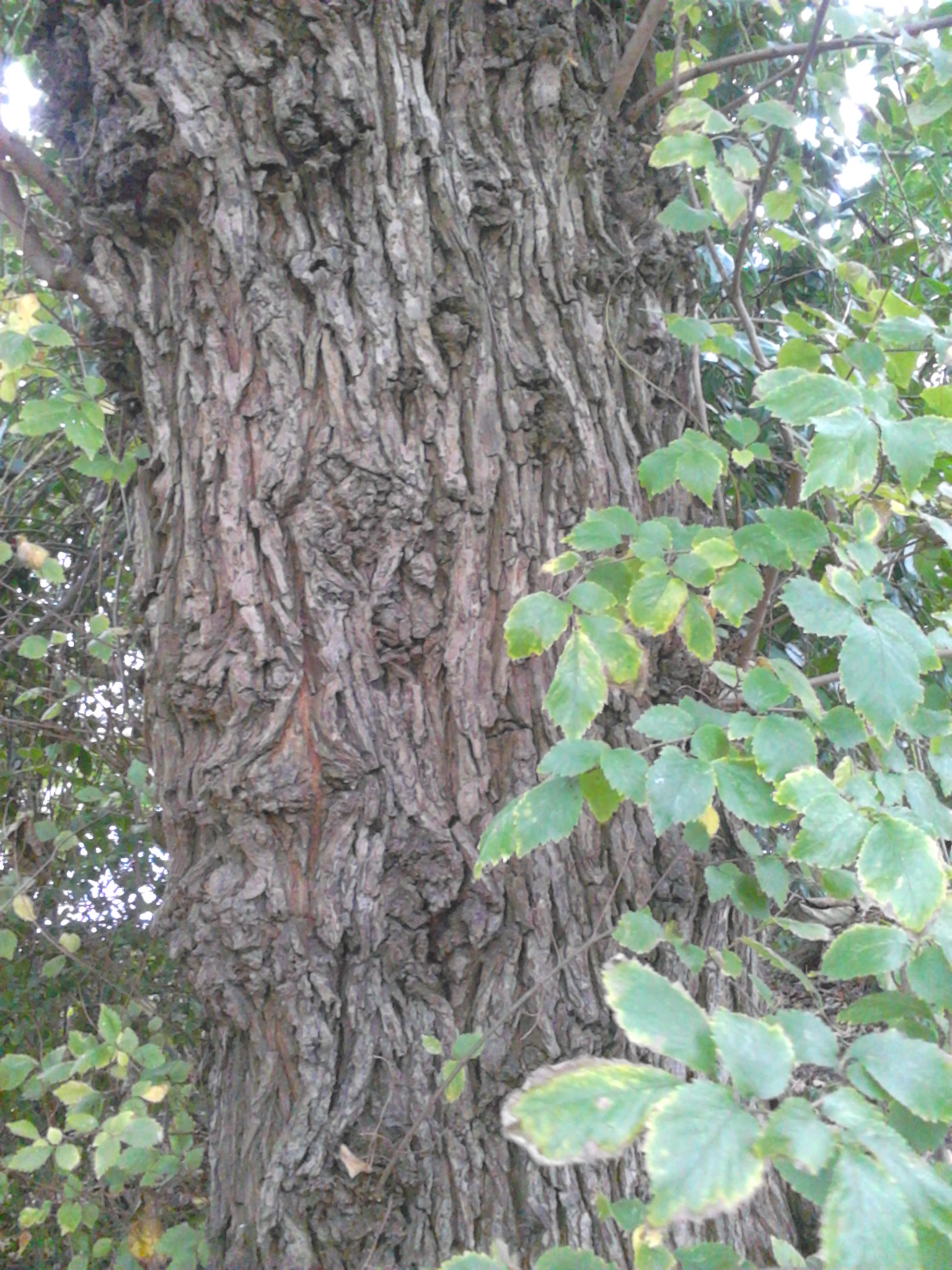
Bark

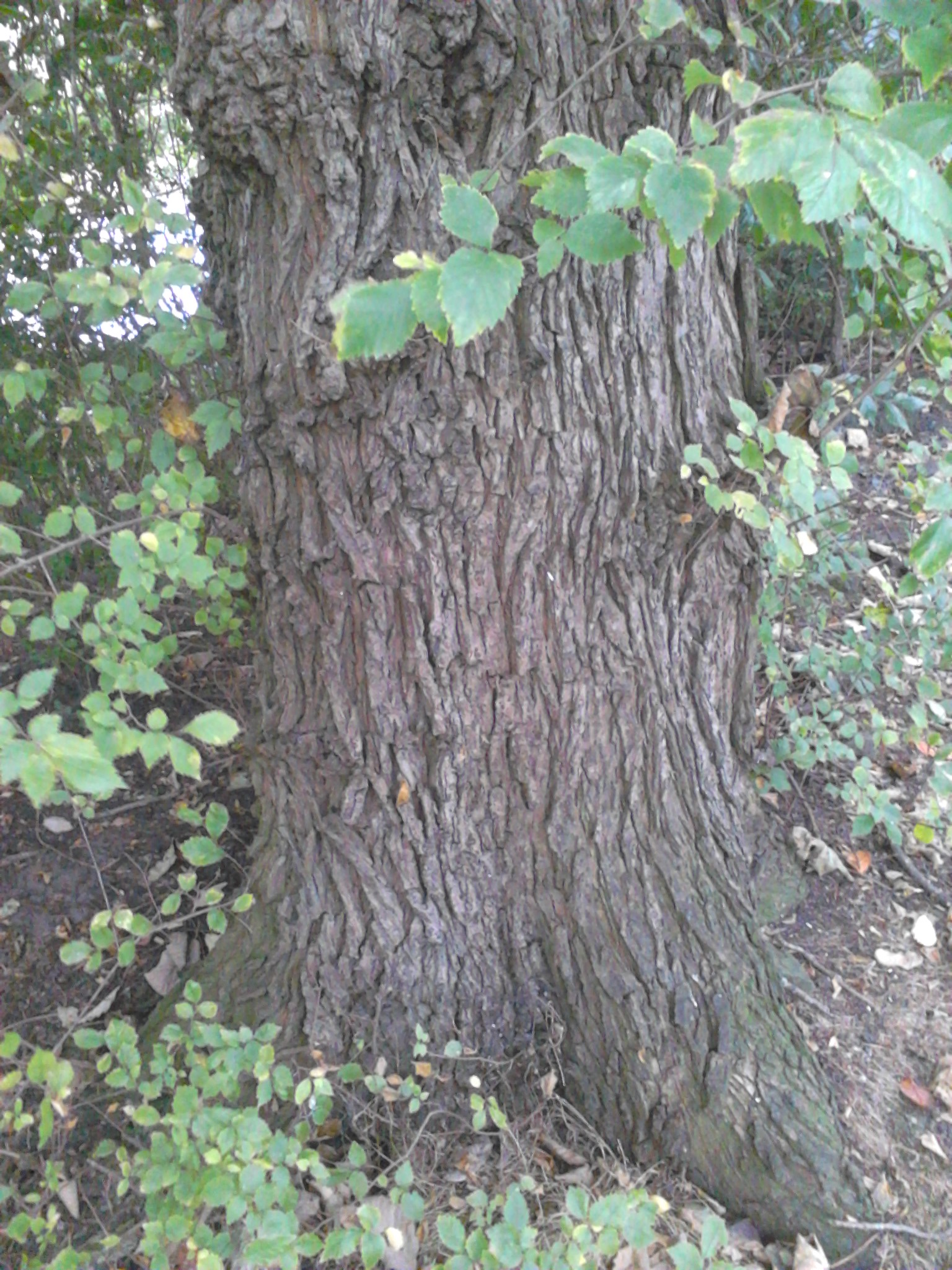
Bole

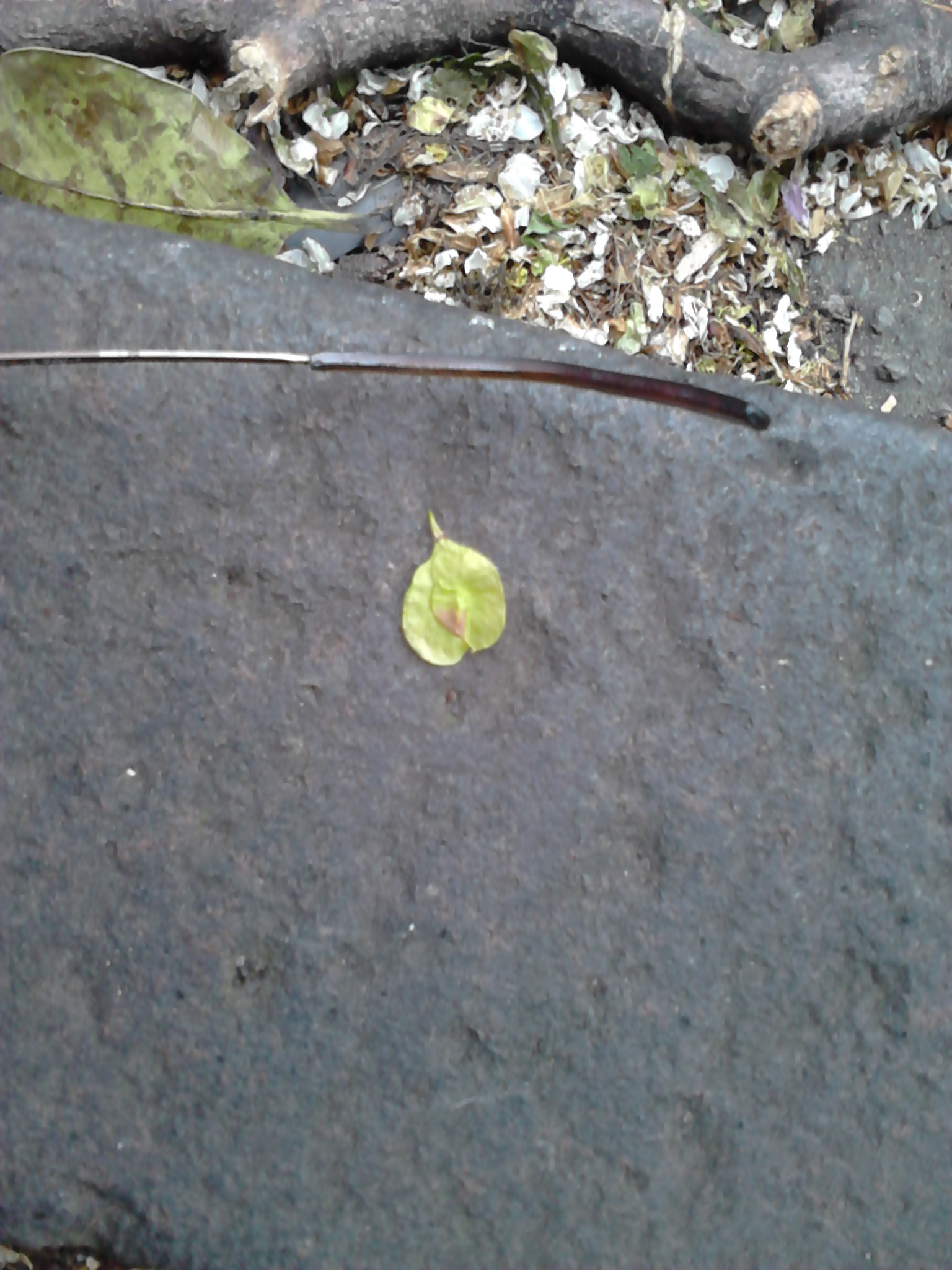
Samara

Moss in The Cambridge British Flora (1914) noted that 'Hunnybunii pseudo-Stricta' was sometimes propagated in error for Cornish elm, Ulmus minor 'Stricta'.

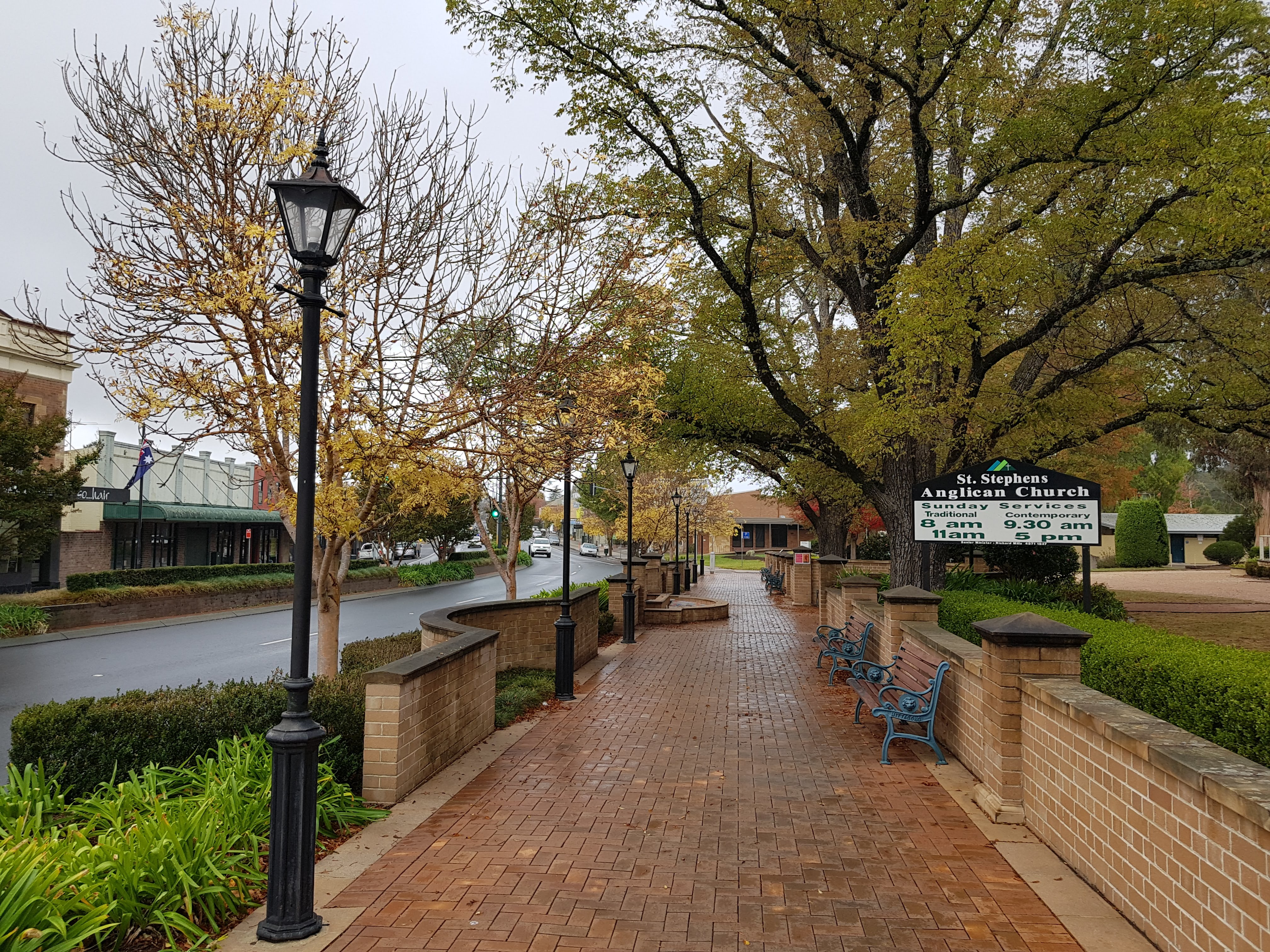
Elms supplied as 'Cornubiensis', St. Stephen's Church, Mittagong, NSW

A cultivar supplied as 'Cornubiensis' remains in cultivation in Australia, but Spencer, describing it in Horticultural Flora of South-Eastern Australia (1995), noted that it was not type-'Stricta'. He gave as an example the elms beside St. Stephen's Church, Mittagong, NSW. The tree labelled (2022) 'Cornish Elm' in Royal Botanic Gardens Victoria (Melbourne), is the hybrid 'Purpurea', cultivated in south-eastern Australia and thought by Dutch elm-authority F. J. Fontaine to be a Cornish elm "cross".

== In art ==
Landscape-paintings depicting Cornish elm include Holman Hunt's watercolour Helston, Cornwall (1860), showing hedgerow elms, and the watercolour Egloshayle, Cornwall by Thomas Campbell-Bennett (1858-1948), showing Cornish elms beside the River Camel, opposite the church of St Mary, Egloshayle. The latter illustrates Gerald Wilkinson's observation that "In its normal habitat the Cornish elm often has a flat, wind-cut top".

== Accessions ==
North America

- Arnold Arboretum, US. Acc. no. 17676, and acc. no. 328-81 (two trees).
- Bartlett Tree Nurseries, US. Acc. no. 96–2161, details unavailable.
- J. C. Raulston Arboretum, North Carolina State University, US. Details unavailable.

Europe

- Brighton & Hove City Council, UK. NCCPG Elm Collection. 12 trees in Bear Road Cemetery, 2 in Hove Cemetery, 2 along Queen's Park Road, 1 along Buckingham Road, 1 at Benfield Valley (Hove Golf Course).
- Cambridge Botanic Garden, University of Cambridge, UK. as U. angustifolia var. cornubiensis, no accession details available.
- Grange Farm Arboretum, Sutton St James, Spalding, Lincolnshire, UK. As U. minor subsp. angustifolia. Acc. no. 1079.
- Wijdemeren City Council, Netherlands. Elm collection. 2 planted at cemetery De Hornhof, Slotlaan, Nederhorst den Berg 2015 (cultivation Noordplant Nursery, Glimmen)
- Royal Botanic Garden Edinburgh. Acc. no. 20171184

Australasia

- Royal Botanic Gardens, Sydney, Australia.

== Nurseries ==
Australasia

- Established Tree Transplanters Pty. Ltd., Wandin, Victoria, Australia.
