= Ulmus minor 'Sarniensis' =

Cultivar of the field elm

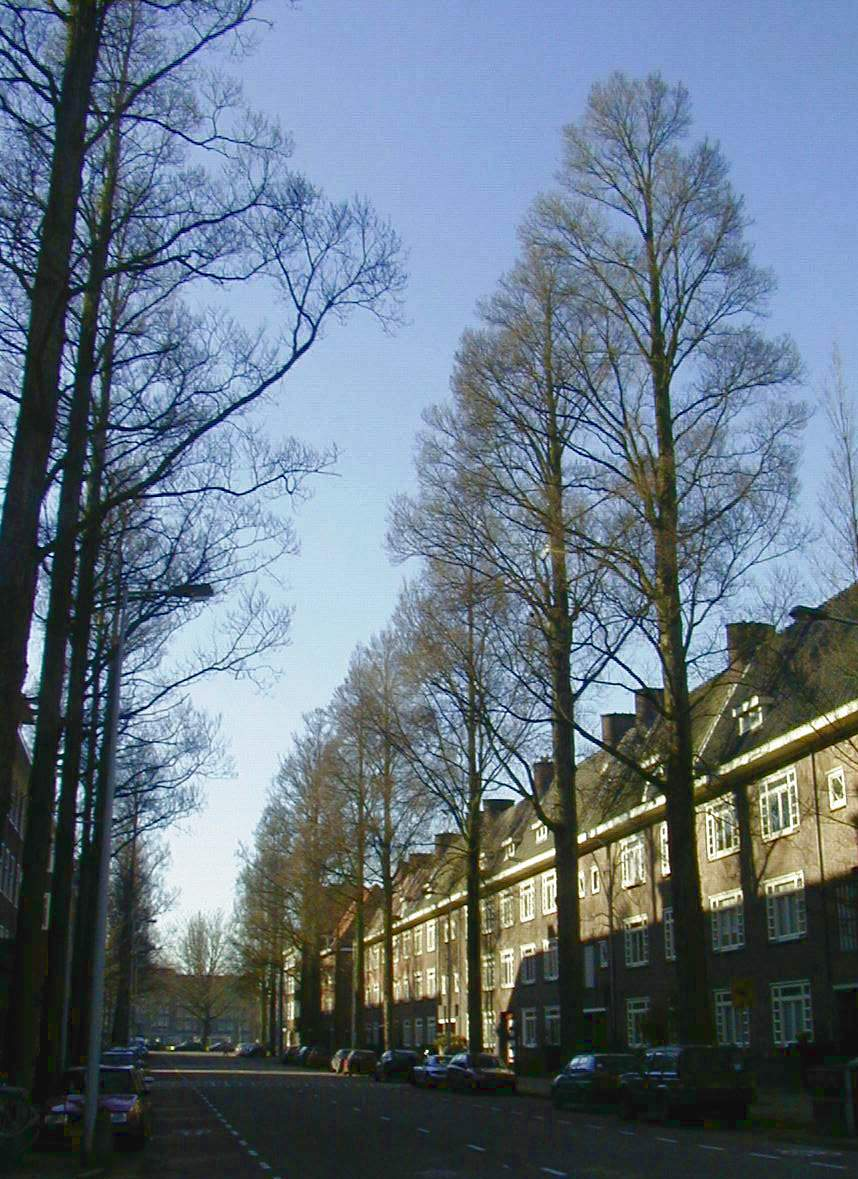
- Guernsey Elms, Amsterdam
- Species: Ulmus minor
- Cultivar: 'Sarniensis'
- Origin: Guernsey, or Brittany

The Field Elm cultivar Ulmus minor 'Sarniensis', known variously as Guernsey elm, Jersey elm, Wheatley elm, or Southampton elm, was first described by MacCulloch in 1815 from trees on Guernsey, and was planted in the Royal Horticultural Society's gardens in the 1820s. It was listed in the Loddiges catalogue of 1836 as Ulmus sarniensis and by Loudon in Hortus lignosus londinensis (1838) as U. campestris var. sarniensis. The origin of the tree remains obscure; Richens believed it "a mutant of a French population of Field elm", noting that "elms of similar leaf-form occur in Cotentin and in northern Brittany. They vary much in habit but some have a tendency to pyramidal growth. Whether the distinctive habit first developed on the mainland or in Guernsey is uncertain."

Melville, believing the cultivar a hybrid between Cornish elm U. minor 'Stricta' and Dutch elm Ulmus × hollandica, adopted the name U. × sarniensis (Loud.) Bancroft. Its clonal origin is (to date) suspected rather than proved, but the apparent uniformity of this taxon makes it likely to be a clone. A number of specimens in northern Britain were DNA-tested in 2013 by Forest Research, Roslin, Midlothian, and were found to be the same clone. Arguing in a 2002 paper that there was no clear distinction between species and subspecies, and suggesting that known or suspected clones of U. minor, once cultivated and named, should be treated as cultivars, Dr Max Coleman of Royal Botanic Garden Edinburgh preferred the designation U. minor 'Sarniensis'.

Guernsey elm was often misnamed 'Cornish elm' in the UK by the local authorities who planted it extensively. It was sometimes confused in continental Europe with the similar 'Monumentalis'. ('Sarniensis' is known as monumentaaliep [:monumental elm] in The Netherlands.)

== Description ==
The tree has a compact, columnar form, not dissimilar to the Lombardy Poplar. Rarely exceeding a height of 27 m, the tree has long stiff ascending branches forming a narrow pyramidal crown. Older specimens broaden round the 'waist', giving trees with a tapering crown a Chianti-flask shape. Like Cornish elm, a narrow-crowned elm from the same area, Guernsey elm is one of the last British trees to come into leaf, and it retains its dark, lustrous foliage into early winter. In favourable conditions it turns a rich golden-yellow in late November or early December. The small leaves and samarae are similar to those of the field elm group in general. Like others of the group, the tree suckers very freely, though it is often base-grafted on wych elm to prevent suckering. The tree often develops highly distinctive cancerous burls on its branches or trunk.

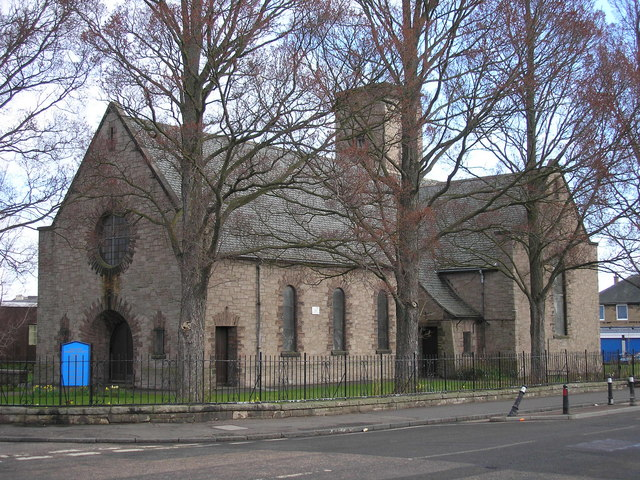
Purplish haze of flowering Guernsey Elm, Granton, Edinburgh

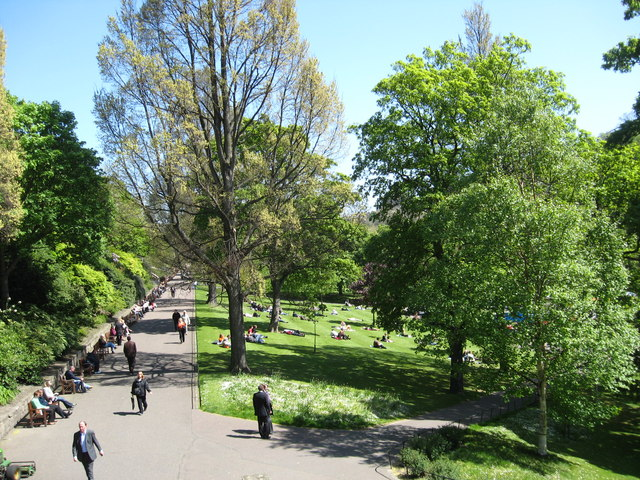
Guernsey Elm (left centre) leafing early summer (Princes Street Gardens, Edinburgh)

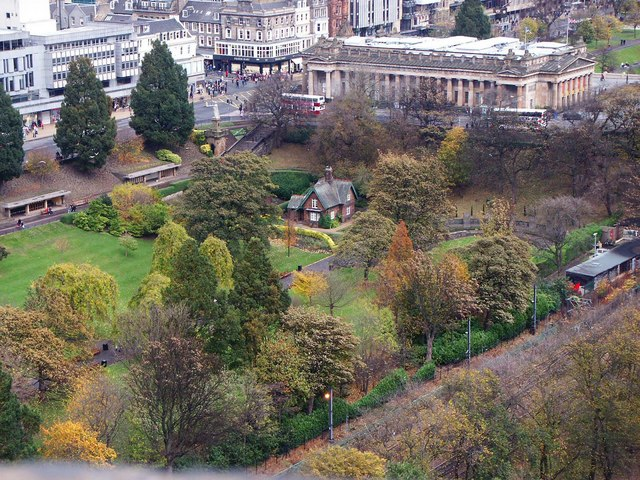
Guernsey Elms (top left), foliage still dark green in early winter (Princes Street Gardens)

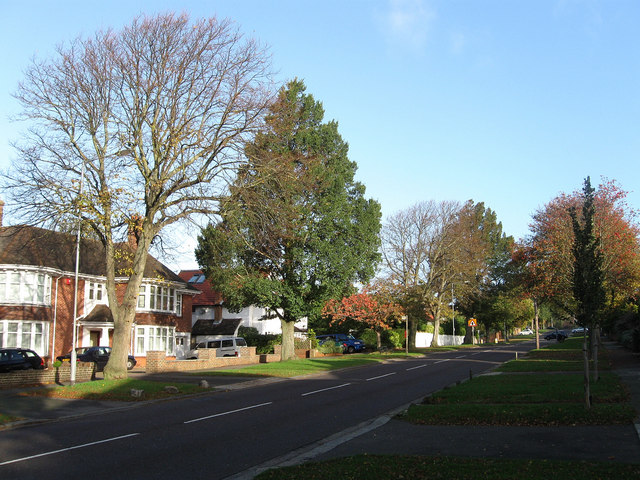
Guernsey Elm in late October, Shirley Drive, Hove

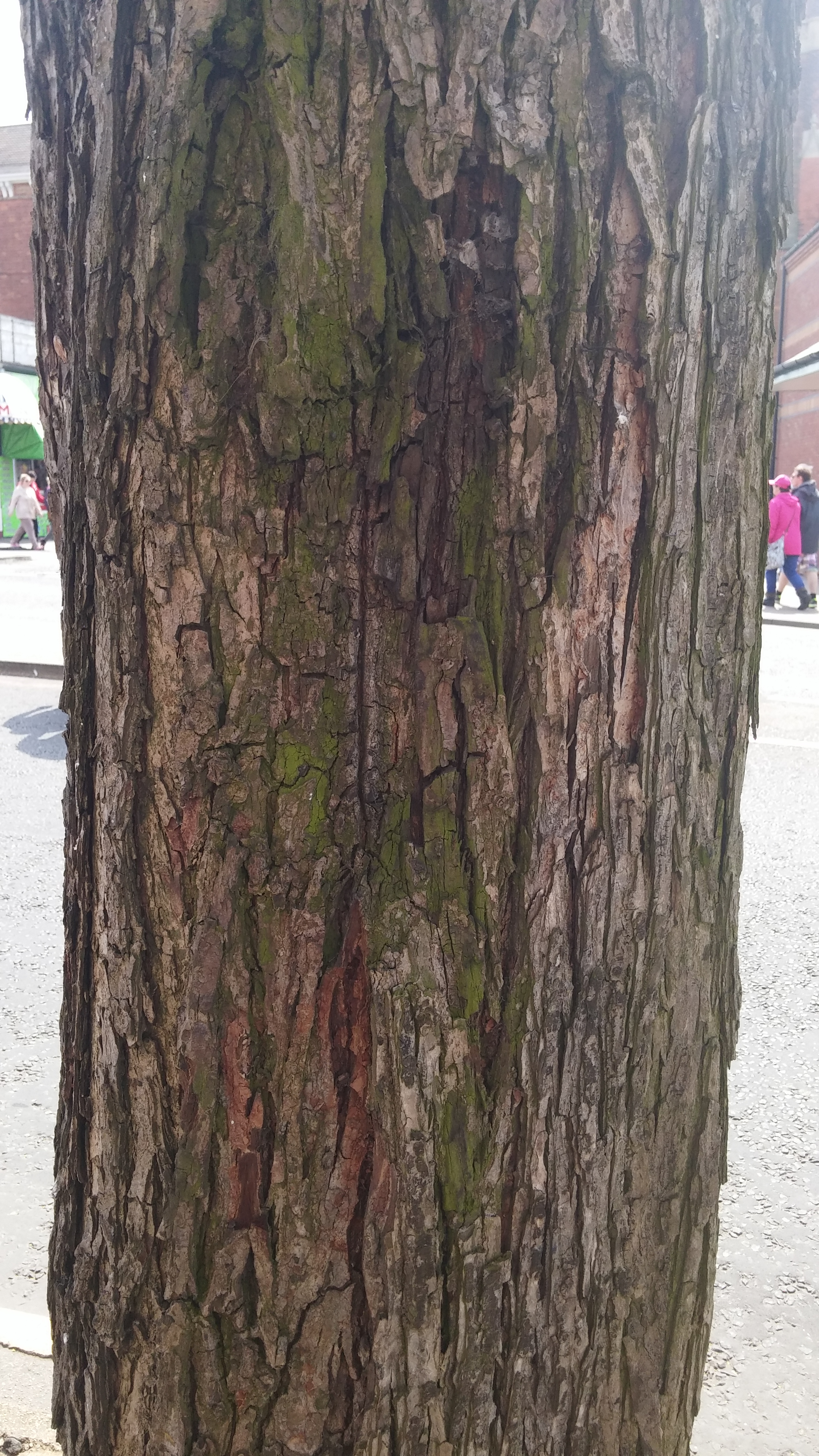
Bark of 'Sarniensis'

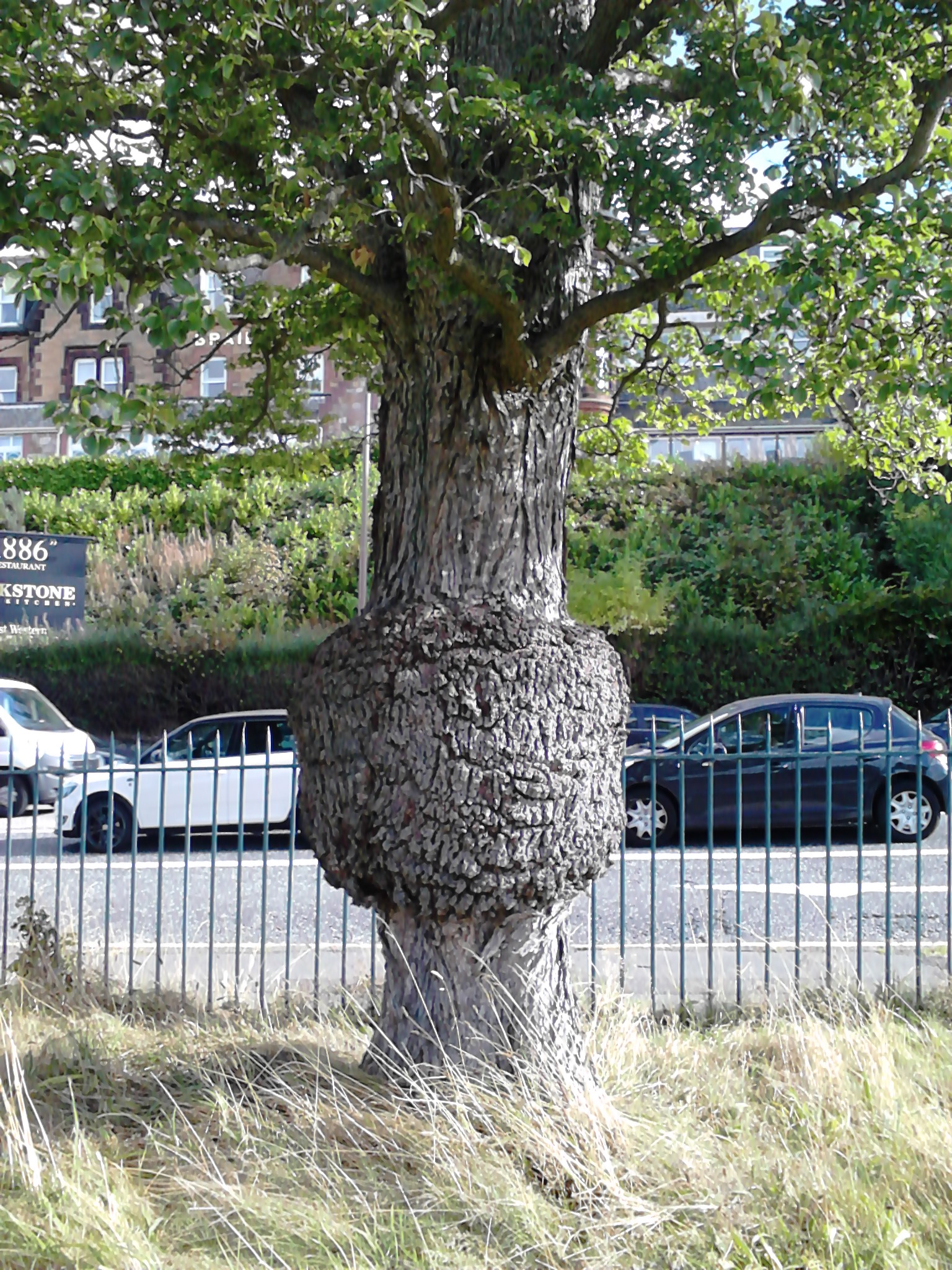
Burl on 'Sarniensis' trunk

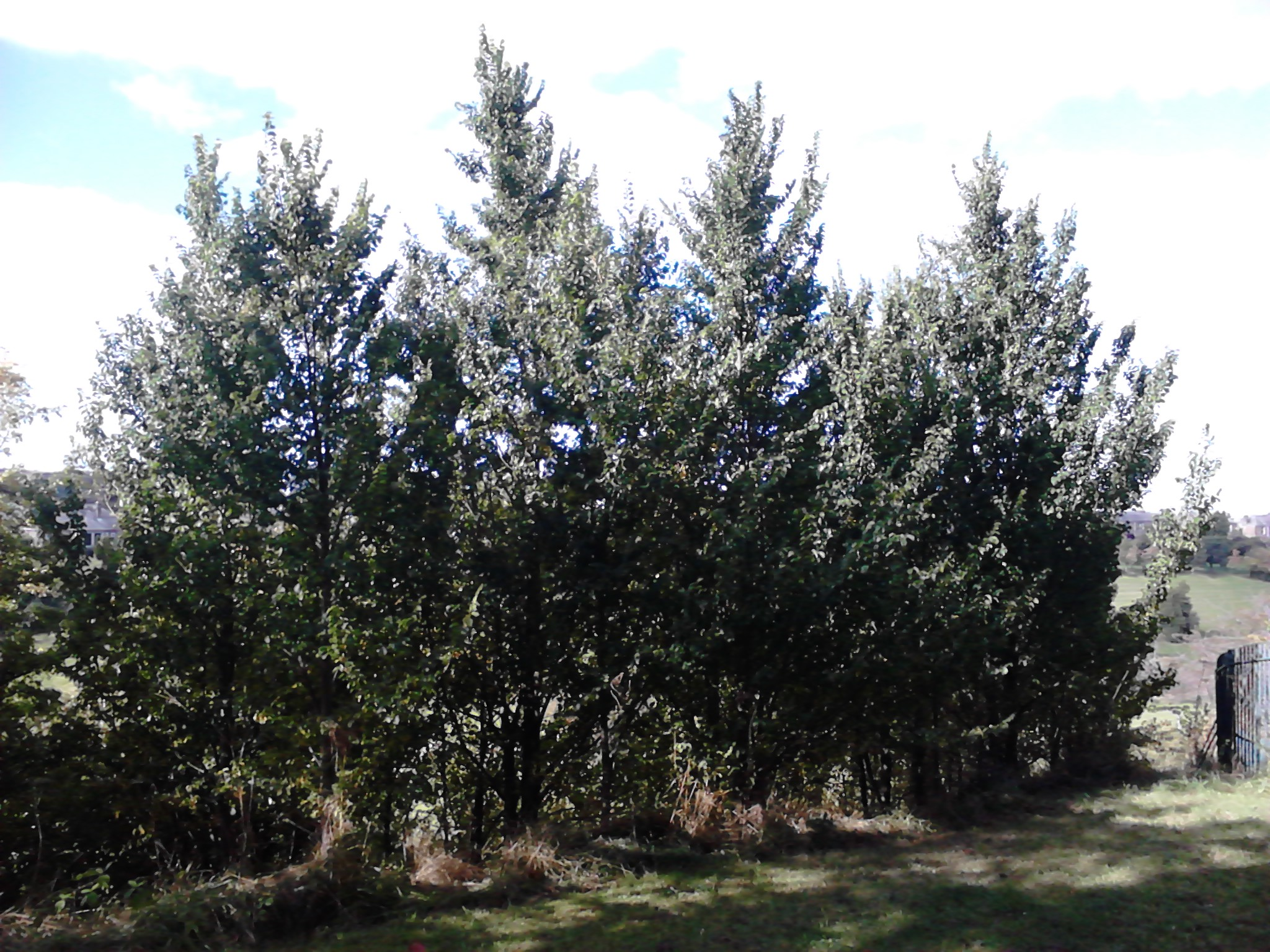
Young 'Sarniensis' spreading from suckers

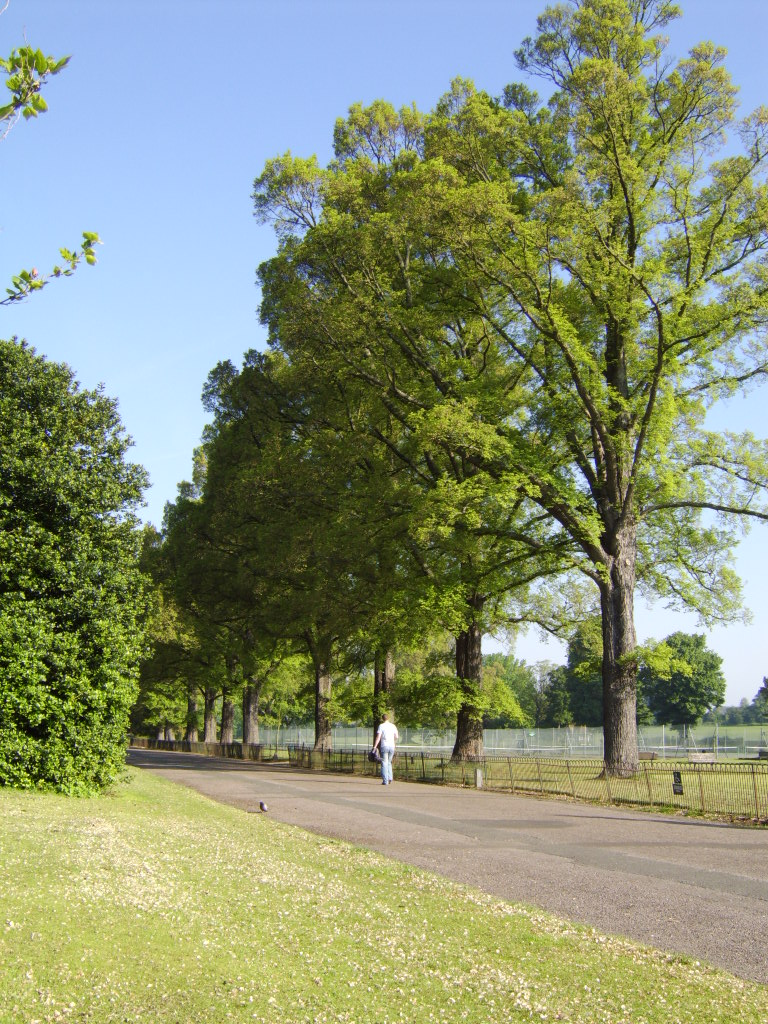
Guernsey elms spreading with age, Preston Park, Brighton (2005)

== Pests and diseases ==
Guernsey elm is very susceptible to Dutch elm disease.

== Cultivation ==
With its light, upcurving branches, Guernsey elm never became a danger, unlike English elm, which sometimes shed heavy lateral boughs. This fact, and its compact form, made it ideal for street planting. The tree was popular in Britain, where it was widely cultivated. Dutch elm disease has, however, now destroyed nearly all the mature trees in England save a few in Brighton, Bridlington, Peasholm Park, Scarborough and a single tree in Skegness. Around a hundred mature specimens still survive in Edinburgh, Scotland (2013). It was introduced to Osborne House on the Isle of Wight by Albert the Prince Consort, where it survives today as suckers along the lane leading to Barton Manor Farm. Guernsey elm was also planted in large numbers across Amsterdam, but eventually replaced by the similarly fastigiate but much more disease-resistant clone, 'Columella'.

One tree, supplied by the Späth nursery, was planted in 1897 as U. campestris sarniensis at the Dominion Arboretum, Ottawa, Canada. 'Sarniensis' was introduced to the United States, featuring in the 1904 catalogue of Frederick W. Kelsey as Ulmus Wheatlyi. In the catalogue of the Plumfield Nursery of Fremont, Nebraska, 1934, its origin was given as Holland. It was described as "a round-headed tree with small glossy leaves, [which] hybridized with American White Elm" (:Ulmus americana), a crossing that would seem unlikely given the ploidy differences. 'Sarniensis' remains in cultivation in the Morton Arboretum. The Ulmus monumentalis introduced to Australia in 1873 is thought to have been 'Sarniensis'.

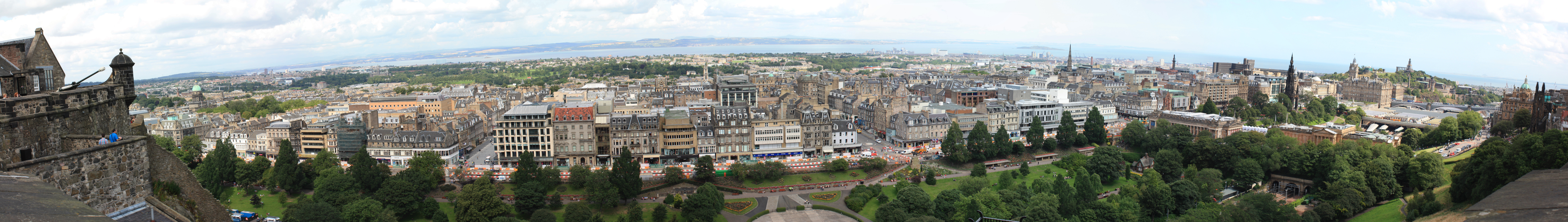
The dark cones of Guernsey Elm dominate Edinburgh's Princes Street Garden (2009)

== Notable trees ==
Elwes considered the Richmond public gardens 'Wheatley', c.90 ft. tall, the finest he had seen. Among the largest surviving specimens of Guernsey elm in the UK are one in Warriston Cemetery, Edinburgh (2017), bole-girth 3 m, and the one in Preston Park, Brighton. The latter is 34 m tall with a trunk 115 cm d.b.h. (diameter at breast height) in 2006, part of a line of trees averaging 30 m in height planted circa 1880. As of June 2020, the specimen beside the cafe in Blakers Park, Brighton, has become the 'national champion', according to the National Elm Collection, following the felling of the Preston Park specimen. The tallest on record in the UK stands on Paradise Drive, Eastbourne and had a height of 36 m in 2007.

In North America, the tree lines West 10th Avenue, Vancouver, British Columbia, Canada.

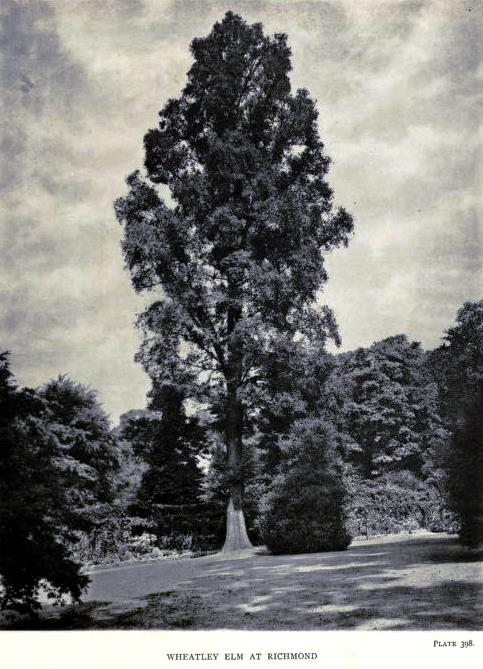
'Sarniensis' at Richmond, London, circa 1913

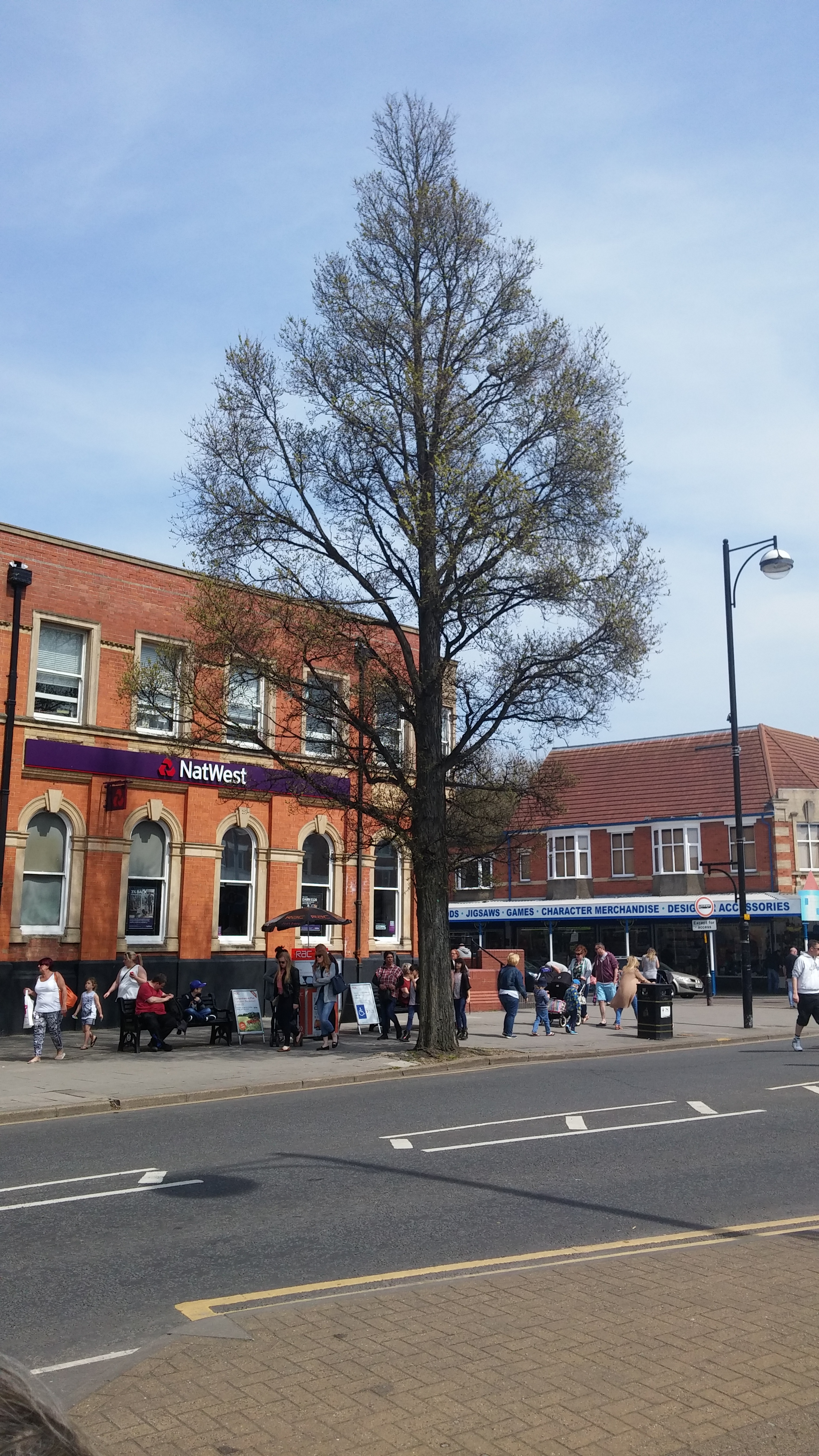
Surviving 'Sarniensis', Skegness, Lincolnshire (2017)

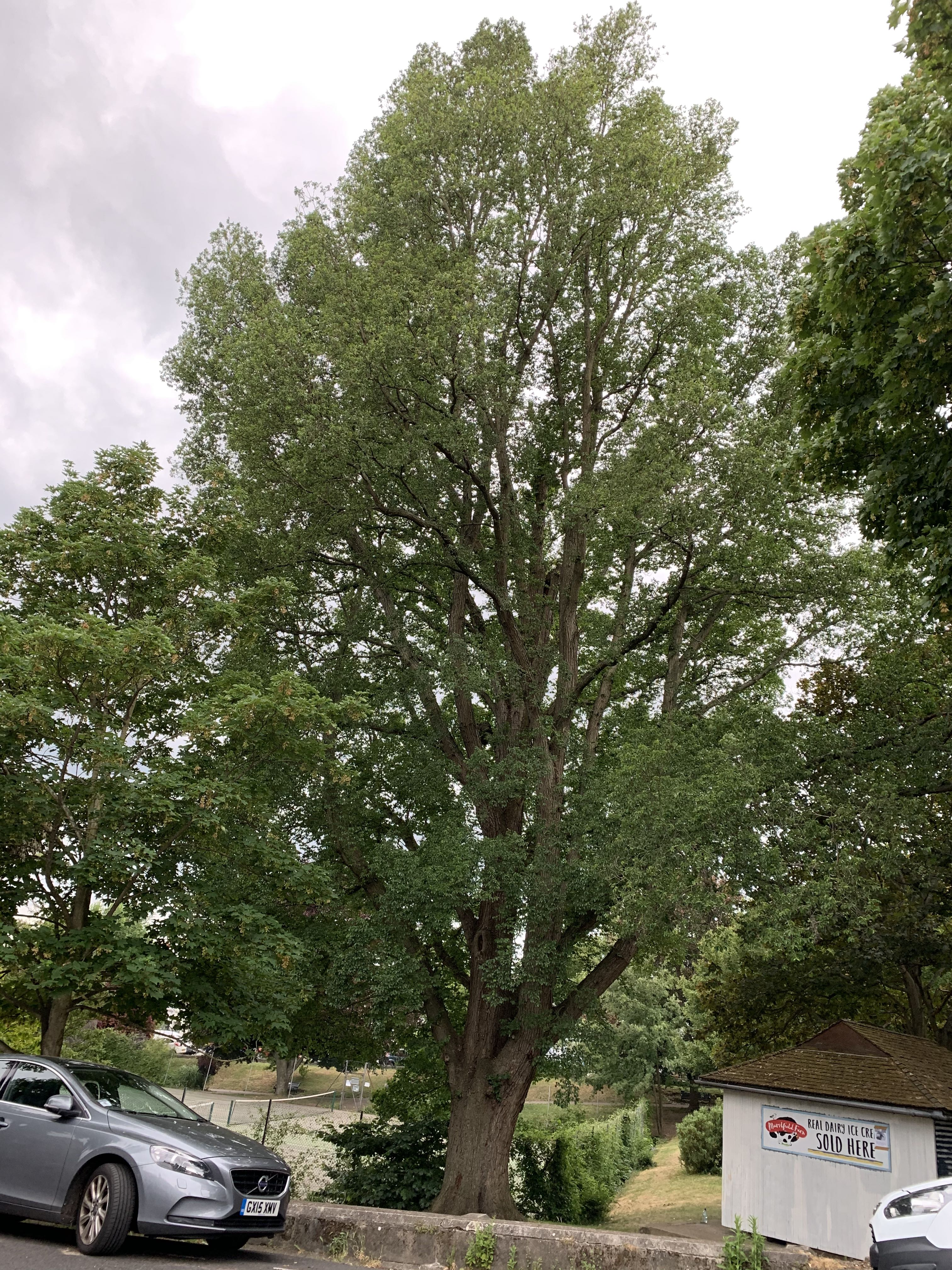
The 'national champion' Wheatley elm, as at 13 June 2020, in Blakers Park, Brighton

== Etymology ==
The tree is named for the Channel Island of Guernsey (Sarnia was the Roman name for Guernsey), where it may have originated. A similar tree is found along the Brittany coast, referred to in several 18th and 19th century French treatises as l'Orme male owing to its phallic resemblance; it is still sometimes referred to as the male elm in Guernsey, although no mature trees survive there either. The synonym Wheatley elm was derived from a tree planted at Wheatley Park, Doncaster, where it was introduced and propagated by Sir William Cooke in the early 19th century. The earliest known use of the name Wheatley elm occurs in the 1869 catalogue of Simon-Louis, Metz. The tree was also raised in great numbers at the Rogers nursery in Southampton in the late 1800s, which probably explains the synonym Southampton elm. Although the tree is also known as the Jersey elm, its introduction from Guernsey has been clearly chronicled. Wilkinson (1978) mentions that some botanists distinguished between 'var. wheatleyi' and 'Jersey elm', presumably the result of slight mutations in the course of repeated propagation.

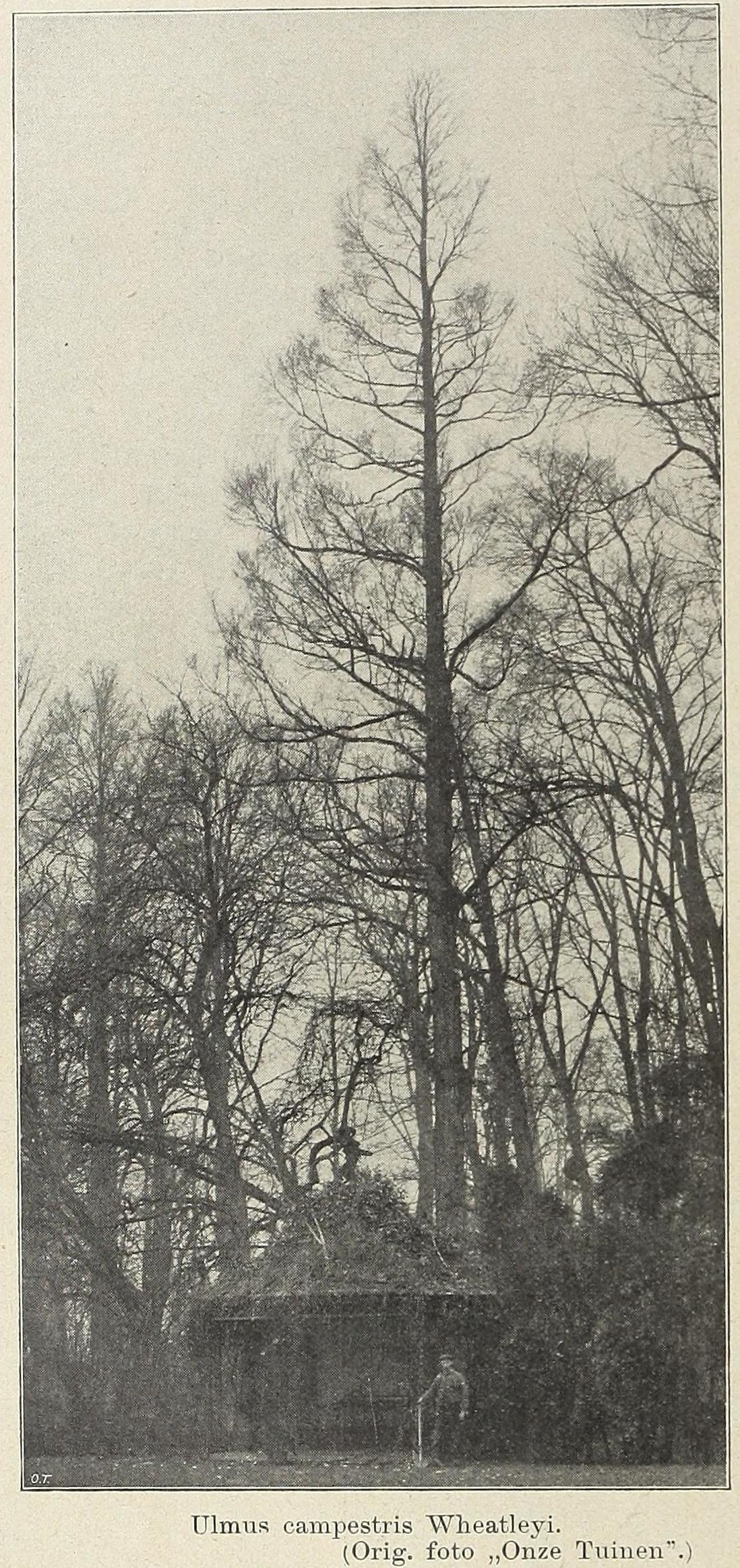
A comparatively level-branched tree labelled 'Wheatleyi', Holland, 1912

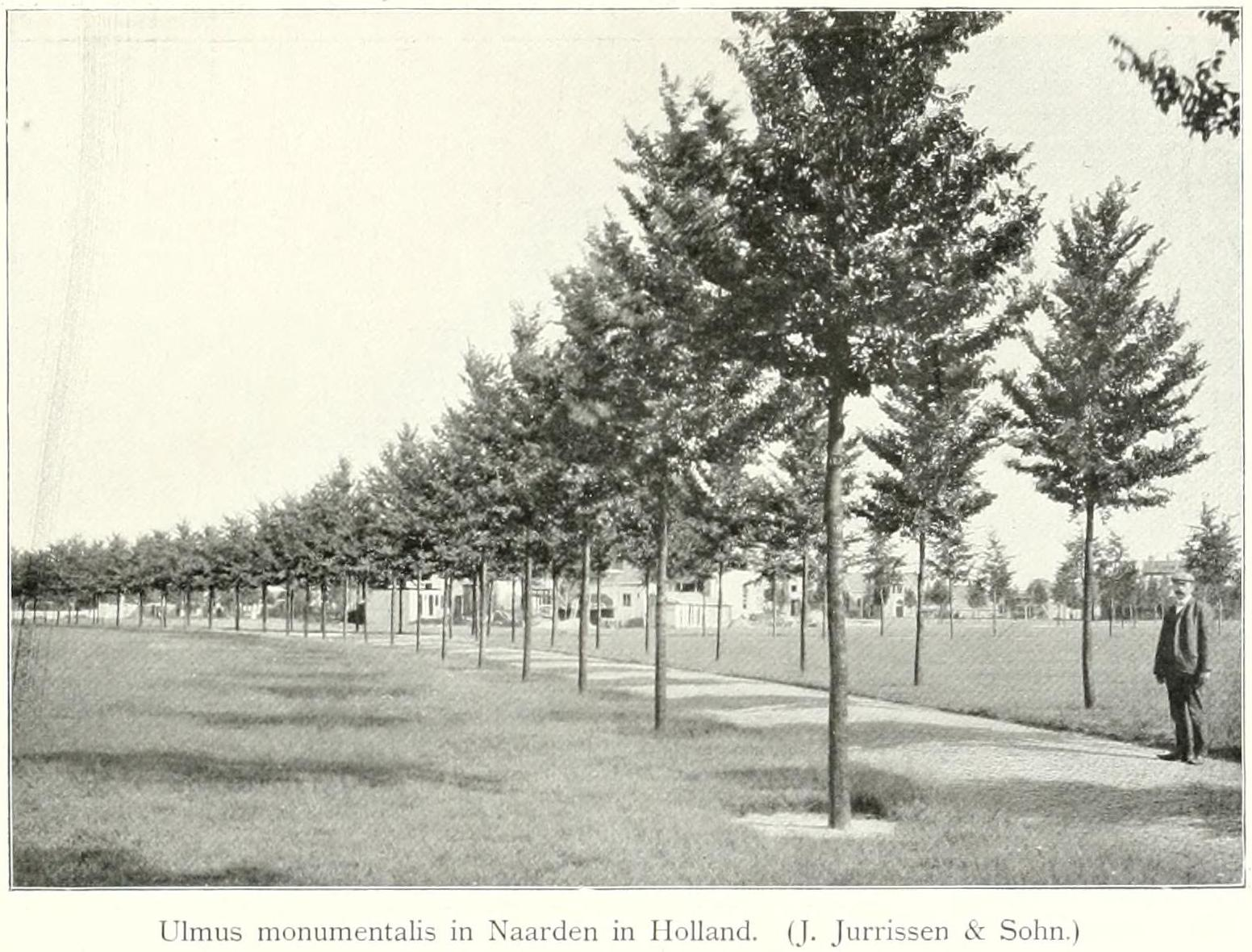
'Sarniensis' in Naarden, the U. monumentalis or monumentaaliep [:monumental elm] of The Netherlands

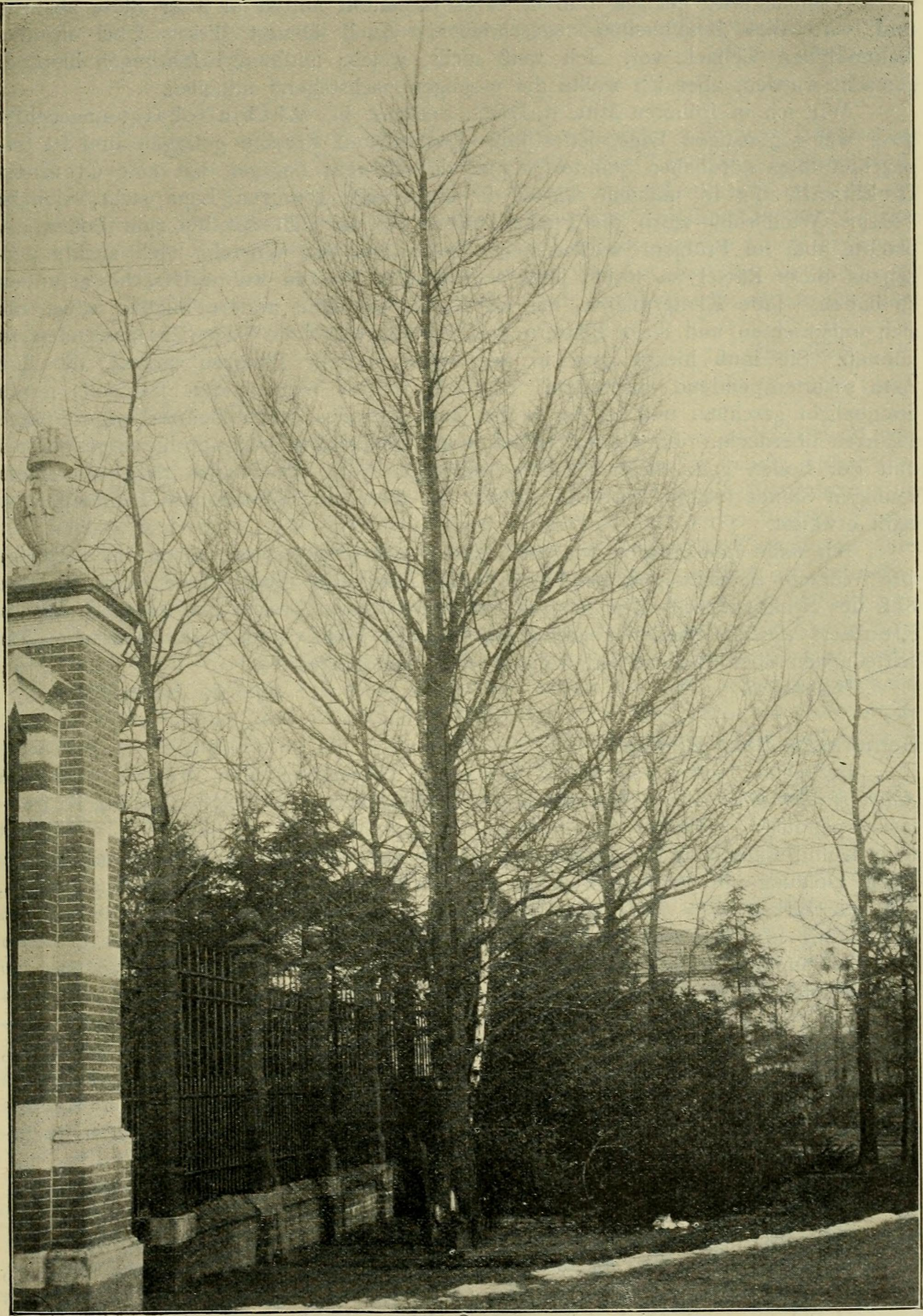
'Sarniensis' in Tilburg, the U. monumentalis or monumentaaliep [:monumental elm] of The Netherlands (c.1909)

== Varieties ==
Some authorities consider 'Dickson's Golden Elm' a form of Guernsey elm. The nursery Messieurs Otin père et fils of Saint-Étienne sold an Ulmus Wheatleyi aurea pyramidalis, with leaves marbled yellow, in 1882.

== Accessions ==
North America

- Holden Arboretum, US. as U. × Sarniensis. Acc. no. 56-185.
- Morton Arboretum, US. as U. carpinifolia 'Sarniensis'. Acc. nos. 591-22, 212-40, 1043-41, all garden collected.
- Smith College, US. as U. carpinifolia 'Sarniensis'. Acc. no. 8120PA.
- United States National Arboretum, Washington, D.C., US. One small tree imported 2011. No accession details available.

Europe

- Brighton & Hove City Council, UK. NCCPG Elm Collection. Including the world's best line at Preston Park; with fine avenues at Surrenden Crescent, Elm Grove, Shirley Drive, Carden Hill. This species is still planted in the city.
- Grange Farm Arboretum , Sutton St James, Spalding, Lincs., UK. Acc. no. 832.
- National Botanic Gardens , Glasnevin, Dublin, Ireland. Location: A3 (153)
- Wakehurst Place Garden, Wakehurst Place, UK. As U. × Sarniensis. Acc. nos. 1977-67, 1977-68, collected by Melville.
- Wijdemeren City Council, Netherlands, Elm Arboretum; 2 trees planted 2019, Overmeerseweg, Nederhorst den Berg.

Australasia

- Eastwoodhill Arboretum , Gisborne, New Zealand. 1 tree (as U. minor 'Sarniensis'), details not known.

== Nurseries ==
North America

None known.

Europe

- Noordplant , Glimmen, Netherlands.
