= Cornish pilot gig =

Type of rowing boat

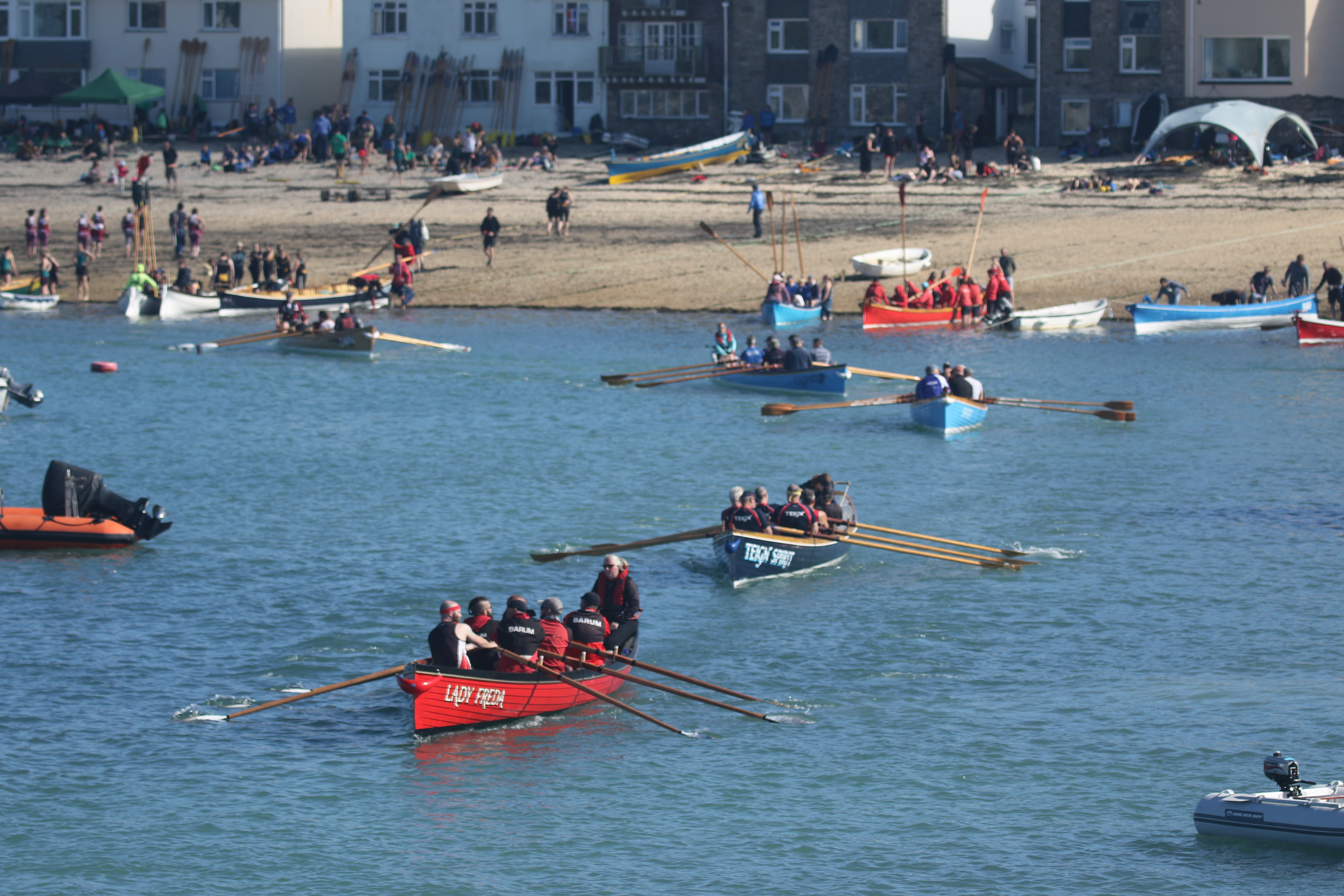
Lady Freda and Teign Spirit lead away from the harbour at St Mary's, Isles of Scilly, during the world pilot gig championships

The Cornish pilot gig is a six-oar rowing boat, clinker-built of Cornish narrow-leaf elm, 32 feet (9.8 m) long with a beam of 4 feet 10 inches (1.47 m). It is recognised as one of the first shore-based lifeboats that went to vessels in distress, with the earliest recorded rescues dating to the late 17th century. The original purpose of the Cornish pilot gig was as a general work boat, and the craft was used as a pilot boat, taking pilots out to incoming vessels off the Atlantic Coast. At the time, pilots would compete with each other for work; the gig crew who got their pilot on board a vessel first would get the job, and hence the payment.

There is a World Pilot Gig championship held in the Isles of Scilly each year at the beginning of May.

== History ==
According to Richard Gillis, the first Cornish pilot gig was built at Polvarth, St Mawes in 1790 by the Peters family. The maritime historian Basil Greenhill simply states that little is known about the origins of this type.

The working gig was planked with narrow-leaf elm from carefully selected trees. This was hand-sawn into quarter-inch (6.4 mm) thick planks, a job done with a high degree of accuracy. American elm was usually used for the keel and timbers, though some were built with oak keels. The overall length of most working gigs varied between 28 and 32 feet (8.5 and 9.8 m); the length was limited by the size of tree that could be found, since the Peters family (the major builder) insisted on no more than one scarph per strake. Whilst most had a 4 feet 10 inches (1.47 m) beam, those intended for salvage work or general carrying would have more, with some examples ranging from 5 feet 4 inches (1.63 m) up to 6 feet (1.8 m) or more.

As experience of gigs developed, they were built with a slight upward bend in the thwarts (by installing a pillar down to the keel), so that if the boat received a sharp blow to the side, the thwart could flex upwards a little instead of punching through the side of the hull and doing serious damage. Early gigs were built with very high quality copper nails and roves whose durability was not matched by those used in later years.

The working gig had a two-masted sailing rig – usually a dipping or standing lug on the main and a standing lug or spritsail on the mizzen. The oars were made of ash and were 14 to 16 feet (4.3 to 4.9 m) long, in some instances 18 feet (5.5 m). These were optimised for long-distance rowing and were used with a slower stroke than today's racing boats (which have shorter silver spruce oars).

The work for gigs ranged from taking pilots out to ships, salvage work, visiting damaged ships to get them to book repairs at the shipyard that owned the gig, taking out cargo samplers to grain ships (the quality of the sample was used in selling the cargo) and a range of miscellaneous transport tasks. Wherever more than one gig was heading out to any speculative job, they were racing for the work as it was customary for the ship's captain to employ the first to arrive. This could involve various subterfuges to overcome the competition. A night-time departure may involve a gig crew setting off down the street to their boat in their stockinged feet so as not to wake another crew. St Mawes gigs would position themselves in a cove from which they could see Falmouth gigs departing – this gave them a head start if the Falmouth boat was heading for a desirable-looking target.

== Pilot gigs today ==
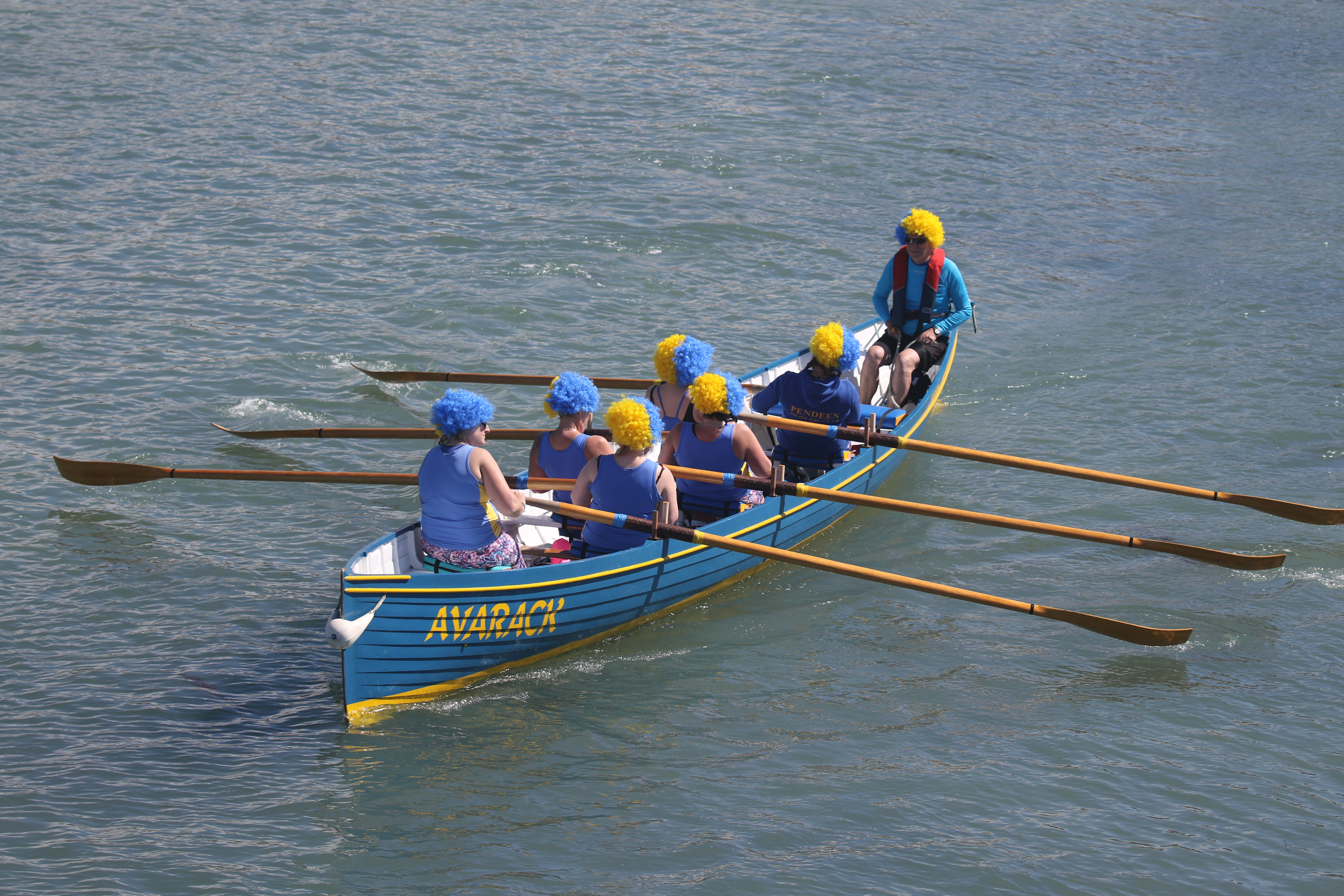
Avarack

Today, pilot gigs are used primarily for sport, with around 100 clubs across the globe. The main concentration is within Cornwall, particularly the west and the Isles of Scilly, however clubs exist in Devon, Suffolk, Sussex, Somerset, Hampshire, Dorset, Wales and London. Internationally, there are pilot gig clubs in France, the Netherlands, the Faroe Islands, Australia, Bermuda, and the United States.

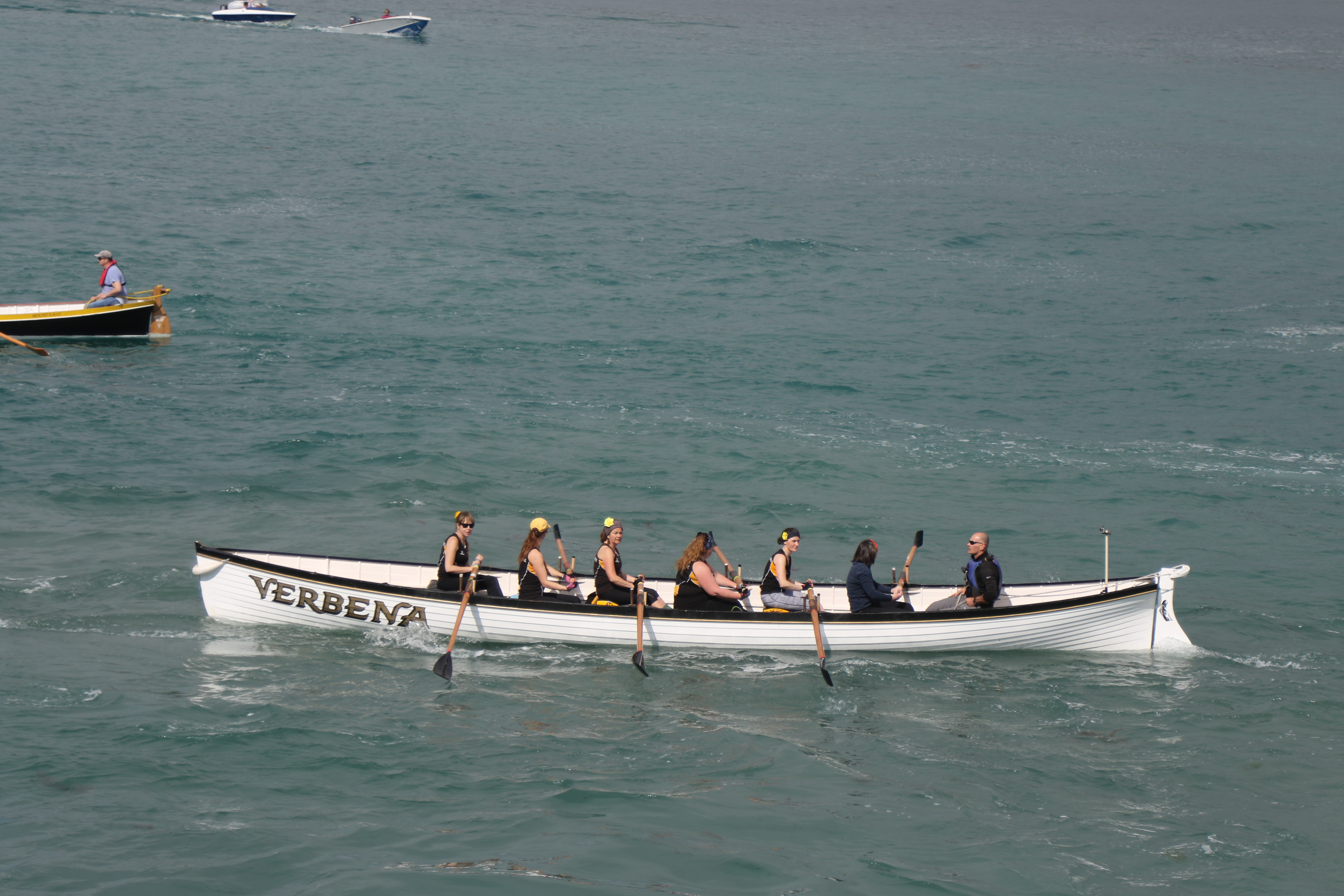
Verbena in St Mary's Harbour

All modern racing gigs are based on the Treffry, built in 1838 by William Peters of St Mawes, and still owned and raced by the Newquay Rowing Club. She was built for the Treffry Company, new owners of Newquay harbour. However non-racing gigs have been built which do not conform to the exact specification of the Treffry and are disallowed from racing in competitive races.

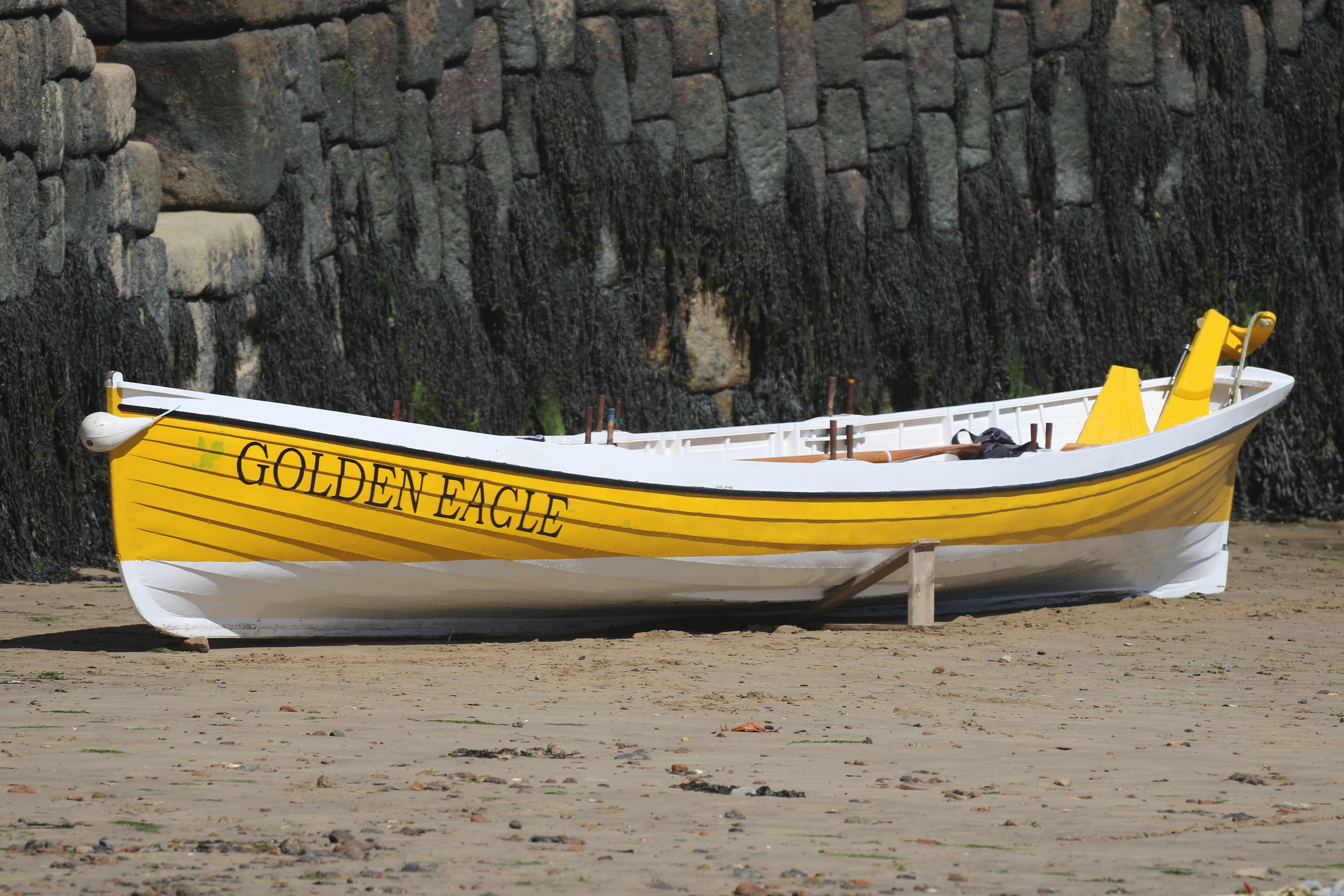
Golden Eagle ashore

The sport is governed by the Cornish Pilot Gig Association, which monitors all racing gigs during the construction phase. The Association's Standards Officer is responsible for measuring every gig at least three times during construction, to ensure that it conforms to the Standard set by the Association. Gigs are crewed by six rowers, and helmed by a coxswain. Modern gig racing dates from 1986, the founding of the CPGA, and the codification of class rules for the construction of new gigs.

In 2018 the 200th gig was registered on the CPGA register, built by W.C. Hunkin and Sons of Fowey. A new gig, complete with trailer and all equipment, costs over £32,000. From 2017, the CPGA has encouraged a 'Club In A Box' scheme. This includes a fibreglass gig, which is much cheaper than a traditionally-built wooden gig and allows a club to form and begin training and fundraising for a competitive boat.

As of 2023, pilot gig racing is becoming more popular in the United States, especially on the New England coast where whaling was a major industry. These boats, however, are less regulated than their British counterparts. While modern rowing technology is considered inappropriate, there are no strict rules as to what can and cannot be raced. Boats are classed by number of rowers and their approximate age. The rules are also different during the race; generally "fisherman's rules" apply—meaning that there are no rules.

With the growth of pilot gig rowing, there has been a demand for more readily available information about gig rowing, leading to the creation of the 'GigRower' website. This website, along with their social media pages, work with the CPGA to provide gig rowing news, information, and live streams of championships to the increasing number of gig rowers around the globe.

== World championships ==
Since 1990, the World Pilot Gig Championships have been held annually on the Isles of Scilly. Held over the Early May bank holiday weekend, they are attended by over 2000 rowers and spectators. It is widely believed to be the busiest weekend on the islands, with an approximate doubling of population.

== Pilot gig clubs ==
Pilot gig clubs are mostly located by the sea although there some that have been established at riverside locations. Pilot gig clubs might also have other types of rowing and sailing vessels.

Many pilot gig clubs compete with each other through a series of events through the summer, most notably at the World Pilot Gig Championships. This is held at the Isles of Scilly, due to its prevalence there, as well as the historical impact the Isles of Scilly have on the sport. Other, more specific championships are held throughout the year at different clubs in Cornwall and further afield, normally coinciding with "regattas" held by the clubs, which run mainly on an invitational basis.

88 pilot gig clubs are members of the Cornish Pilot Gig Association.

== See also ==
- Ann Glanville – British rower (1796–1880)
