= World Pilot Gig Championships =

Annual gig racing event

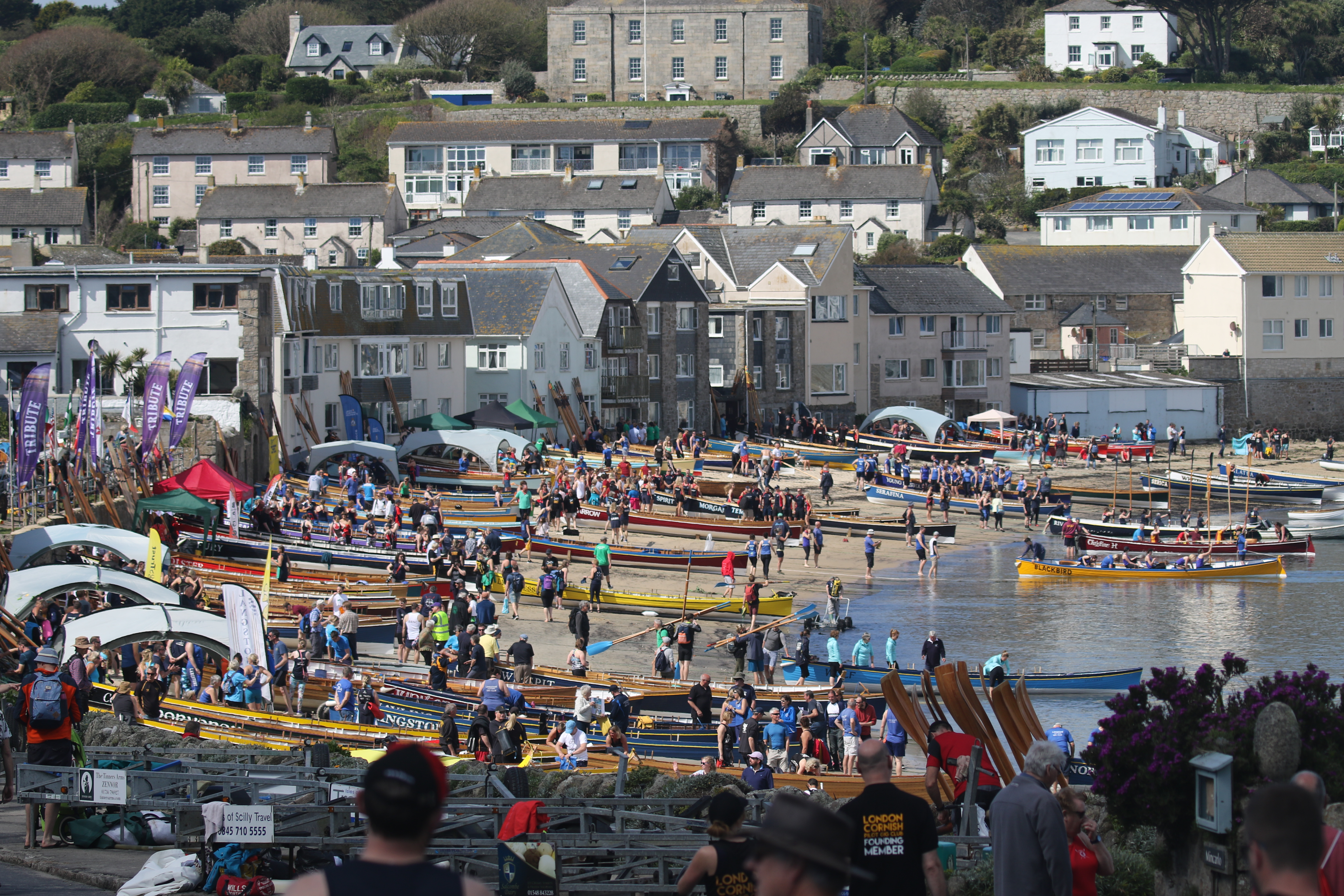
Pilot gig boats on the beach in Hugh Town, St Mary's, Isles of Scilly in 2018

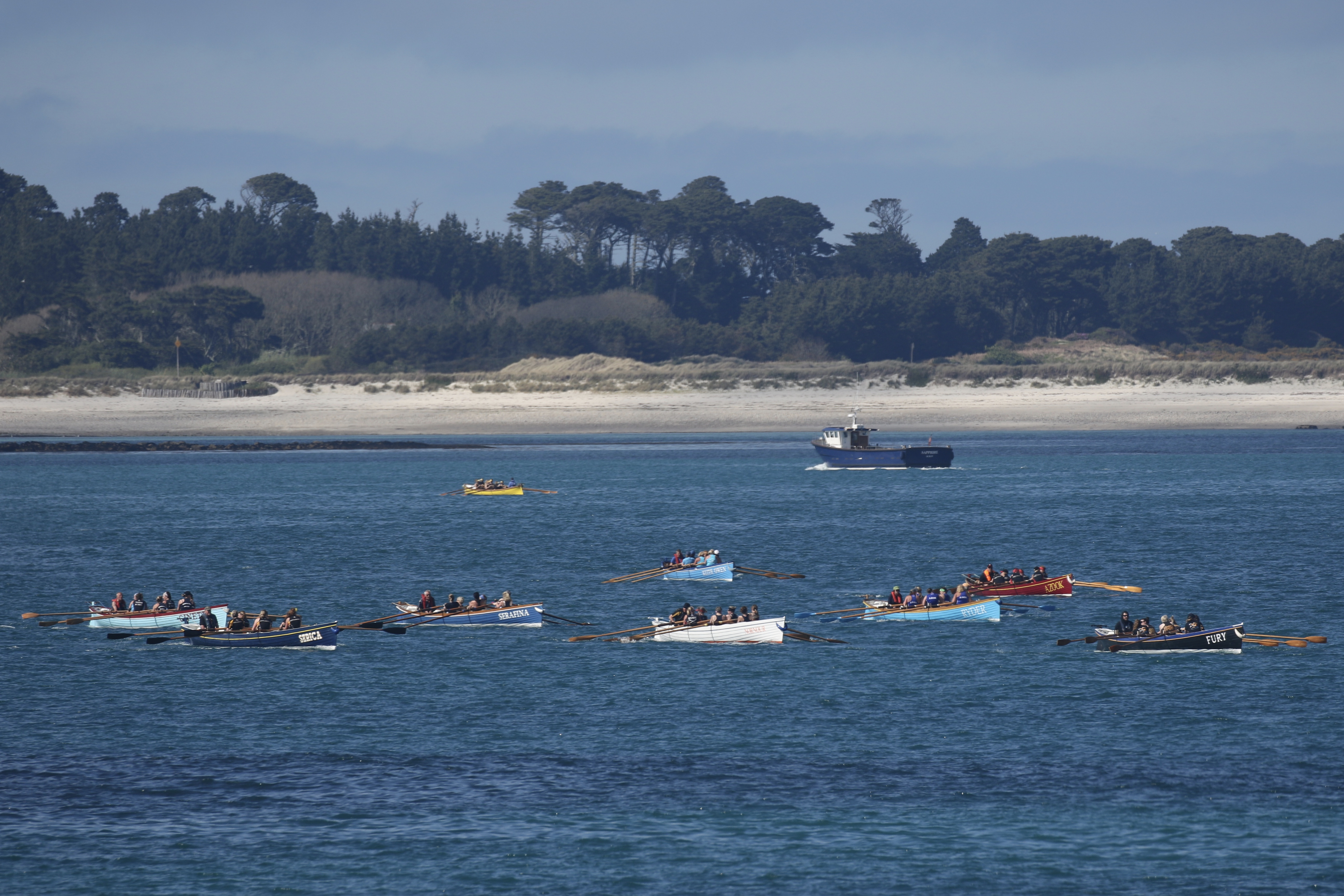
Race underway south of Tresco

The World Pilot Gig Championships are an annual gig racing event held on the Isles of Scilly, United Kingdom during the May Day bank holiday weekend.

The World Championships were first held in 1990, only attracting a few crews from Cornwall, but over the years the amount of pilot gigs attending has increased with crews coming from all over the South of England, the Netherlands, Ireland, France and beyond.

== Races ==
There are multiple races that take place over the weekend, of varying distance, all starting on the Friday night. The women's and men's Veterans (40+) and Super Veterans (50+) races take place on Friday evening, while the four Open races take place on Saturday and Sunday. Traditionally a sailing race is held on the Monday along with an Isles of Scilly vs Mainland rugby union match.

St Agnes

The longest race is from the island of St. Agnes down to the finish line just off the quay of St. Mary's (approx 1.6 nautical miles). Both Veterans and Super Veterans races follow this course to decide the winner of the trophy for these categories.

On the Saturday the women and men race separately, with a full line up of gigs. In 2019 163 gigs were on the women's start line with 160 crews competing in the men's race. The finishing positions from the St. Agnes course determine the seedings for the subsequent heats.

Nut Rock

Each gig is seeded based on the St. Agnes race and the heats are split into groups of 12 for the race from Nut Rock back to St. Mary's (approx 1.16 nautical miles). Two heats are held - one on Saturday and one of Sunday morning - with the top two gigs in each group being promoted and the bottom two relegated.

The finals for both the women and men take place on the Sunday afternoon, again racing the same Nut Rock course. Each group then has a winner and the outcome of group A decides who is the overall champions.

== Results ==
Women's results

Year	1st place	2nd place	3rd place
1990	Newquay	Padstow	Fowey
1991	Isles of Scilly	Roseland	Newquay
1992	Isles of Scilly	Padstow	Newquay
1993	Newquay	Isles of Scilly	Fowey
1994	Fowey	Isles of Scilly	Falmouth
1995	Falmouth	Port Isaac	Isles of Scilly
1996	Fowey	Falmouth	Truro
1997	Falmouth	Fowey	Isles of Scilly
1998	Falmouth	KWV De-Kaag (Netherlands)	Isles of Scilly
1999	KWV De-Kaag (Netherlands)	Falmouth	Charlestown
2000	Isles of Scilly	KWV De-Kaag (Netherlands)	Falmouth
2001	Isles of Scilly	Par Bay	KWV De-Kaag (Netherlands)
2002	Falmouth	Isles of Scilly	Mounts Bay
2003	Isles of Scilly	KWV De-Kaag (Netherlands)	Salcombe
2004	Falmouth	Isles of Scilly	Charlestown
2005	Falmouth	Isles of Scilly	Caradon
2006	Falmouth	Mounts Bay	Caradon
2007	Falmouth	Roseland	Caradon
2008	Falmouth	Charlestown	Roseland
2009	Roseland	Falmouth	Mounts Bay
2010	Falmouth	Roseland	Scheveningen (Netherlands)
2011	Falmouth	Scheveningen (Netherlands)	Charlestown
2012	Falmouth	Isles of Scilly (St Mary's)	Par Bay
2013	Falmouth	Mounts Bay	Caradon
2014	Falmouth	Isles of Scilly (St Mary’s)	Roseland
2015	Newquay	Mounts Bay	Roseland
2016	Caradon	Flushing and Mylor	Isles of Scilly (St Mary's)
2017	Caradon	Fowey	Isles of Scilly (St Mary's)
2018	Caradon	Falmouth	Mounts Bay
2019	Falmouth	Caradon	Scheveningen

Men's results

Year	1st place	2nd place	3rd place
1990	Truro	Isles of Scilly	Isles of Scilly
1991	Isles of Scilly	Fowey	Truro
1992	Isles of Scilly	Truro	Isles of Scilly
1993	Isles of Scilly	Truro	Isles of Scilly
1994	Isles of Scilly	Hayle	Caradon
1995	Caradon	Isles of Scilly	Par Bay
1996	Caradon	Truro	Roseland
1997	Caradon	Roseland	Par Bay
1998	Caradon	Par Bay	Roseland
1999	Caradon	Isles of Scilly	Par Bay
2000	Caradon	Roseland	KWV De-Kaag (Netherlands)
2001	Caradon	Roseland	Falmouth
2002	Falmouth	Caradon	Rame
2003	Caradon	Rame	Isles of Scilly
2004	Caradon	Falmouth	Caradon B
2005	Caradon	Caradon B	Par Bay
2006	Caradon	Roseland	Caradon B
2007	Caradon	Roseland	Par Bay
2008	Mounts Bay	Par Bay	Roseland
2009	Par Bay	Caradon	Falmouth
2010	Par Bay	Caradon	Mounts Bay
2011	Falmouth	Caradon	Mounts Bay
2012	Falmouth	Looe	Caradon
2013	Falmouth	Looe	Roseland
2014	Falmouth	Looe	Caradon
2015	Falmouth	Caradon	Looe
2016	Falmouth	Looe	Caradon
2017	Falmouth	Looe	Caradon
2018	Looe	Caradon	Falmouth
2019	Looe	Roseland	Coverack

== Results by crew ==
Women

Rank	Crew	1st place	2nd place	3rd place	Total
1	Falmouth	15	4	2	21
2	Isles of Scilly	5	7	5	17
3	Caradon	3	1	4	8
4	Newquay	3	0	2	5
5	Fowey	2	2	2	6
6	Roseland	1	3	3	7
7	KWV De-Kaag (Netherlands)	1	3	1	5
8	Mounts Bay	0	3	3	6
9	Padstow	0	2	0	2
10	Charlestown	0	1	3	4
11	Scheveningen (Netherlands)	0	1	2	3
12	Par Bay	0	1	1	2
13	Port Isaac	0	1	0	1
13=	Flushing and Mylor	0	1	0	1
14	Salcombe	0	0	1	1
14=	Truro	0	0	1	1

Men

Rank	Crew	1st place	2nd place	3rd place	Total
1	Caradon	12	5	6	23
2	Falmouth	8	1	3	12
3	Isles of Scilly	4	3	4	11
4	Looe	2	6	0	8
5	Par Bay	2	2	5	9
6	Truro	1	3	1	5
7	Mounts Bay	1	0	2	3
8	Roseland	0	6	4	10
9	Caradon B	0	1	2	3
10	Rame	0	1	1	2
11	Fowey	0	1	0	1
11=	Hayle	0	1	0	1
12	KWV De-Kaag (Netherlands)	0	0	1	1
12=	Coverack	0	0	1	1
