= Cornish Pilot Gig Association =

The Cornish Pilot Gig Association (or CPGA) is a body which governs the sport of Cornish pilot gig racing. As of March 2023 it is made up of 88 clubs and over 8,000 active gig rowers. This does not include gigs used in the Isles of Scilly.

== History of the Cornish Pilot Gig Association ==
The first 'gigs' were built in the late 18th century and were used to carry the 'pilot' out to ships waiting off the Cornish coasts.

The pilot would then navigate the ship through the potentially hazardous rocks into the harbour.

Pilots needed to row out to the ships quickly - it was a competitive career as the first man to reach the waiting ship would receive the pilot's fee. Gig racing evolved both from this competition and from the testing of newly built gigs against others to measure their performance.

Competitive gig racing was popular in Cornwall during the mid-19th century, but by the end of the century began to decline as the industrial revolution gathered speed and engines increasingly replaced sails and oars.

Many gigs were subsequently broken up or left to rot, but Newquay in Cornwall managed to retain a few and formed Newquay Rowing Club in 1921.

One of their boats, 'Treffry' built in 1838 still races and is used as the standard measurement for the construction of all new boats.

Newquay Rowing Club also owns two other historic gigs: 'Dove' built in 1820 and 'Newquay' built in 1812 - which is considered to be the oldest rowing boat in the world.

Between 1985 and 1986 four new gig clubs were formed (Truro, Cadgwith, Roseland and Mount's Bay). This was in addition to Newquay Rowing Club (formed in 1922) and the small number of rowing clubs that existed around the coast.

During 1986 George Northey (Newquay Rowing Club), John Bawden and Ralph Bird all felt that a specification should be laid down as to how the new gigs should be built.

A meeting was called for 5 December 1986, with total of 14 gentlemen attending. It was decided that the new gigs would be built to the specification laid down by the Peters family, which built the gigs 'Treffry' (1838), which is still actively rowed by the Newquay Rowing Club. It was decided that there would only be one officer which would be elected as the chairperson and he would carry out the measuring of the gig during the construction phase to make sure the gig complied with the new specifications.

The committee met again in the January 1987 at the Royal Hotel in Truro and accepted the plans that had been drawn up by Ralph Bird. In the meeting it was decided that the association would be called the Cornish Pilot Gig Association.
