= Pyramidal elm =

Pyramidal or pyramid elm may refer to various cultivars of Wych elm Ulmus glabra and other elms. The following list is not complete:

- Ulmus glabra = campestris, sometimes referred to as pyramidal; its inner bark was used medicinally
- Ulmus 'Exoniensis', the Exeter Elm, when trimmed in pyramid form, the Scandinavian pyramidalm
  - Ulmus glabra 'Fastigiata Variegata'
- Ulmus minor 'Atinia Pyramidalis'
