= Ulmus 'Dodoens' =

Elm cultivar

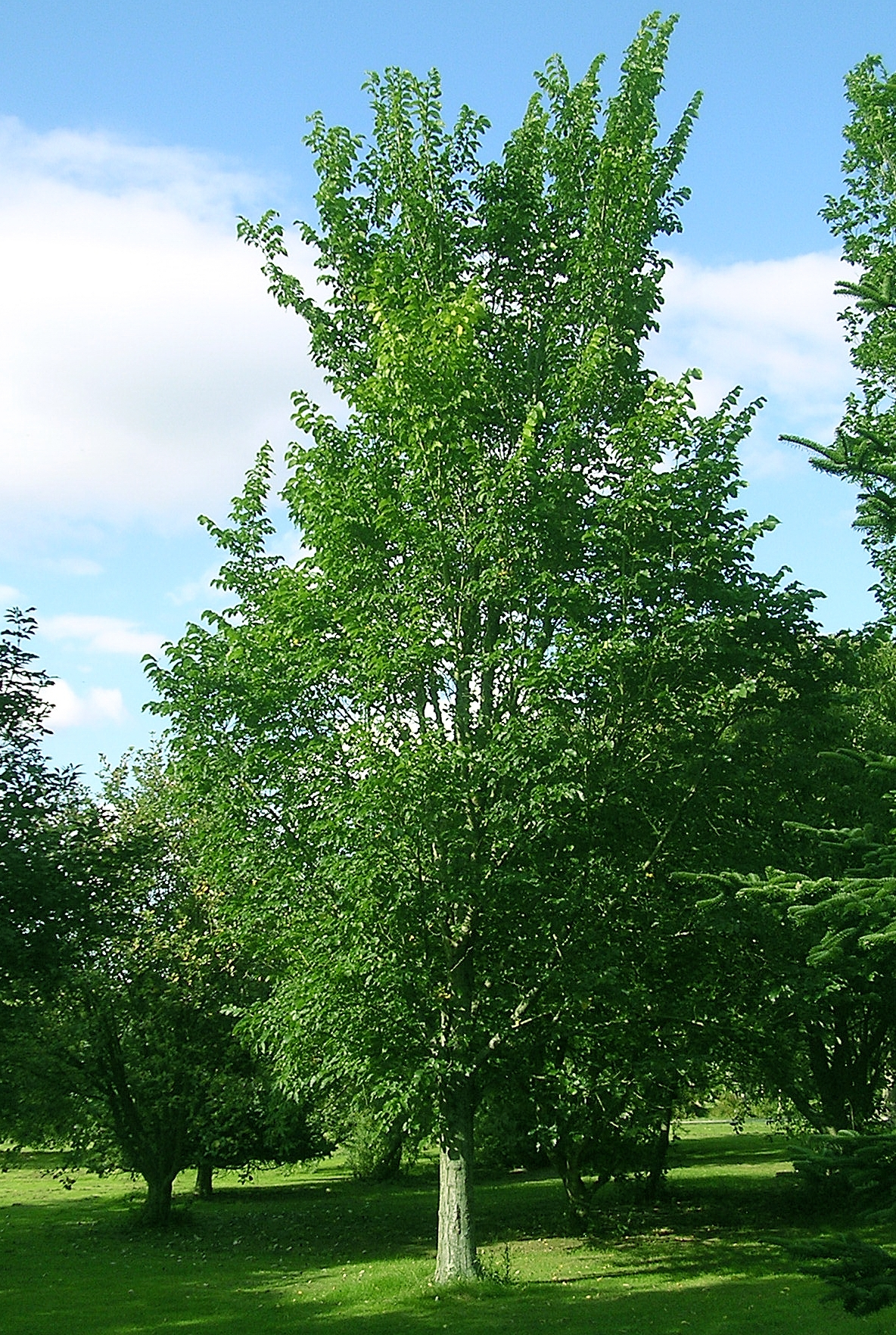
- 'Dodoens', Sir Harold Hillier Gardens, UK
- Genus: Ulmus
- Hybrid parentage: ('Exoniensis' × U. wallichiana) selfed
- Cultivar: 'Dodoens'
- Origin: Wageningen, The Netherlands

The Dutch hybrid cultivar Ulmus 'Dodoens' was derived from a selfed seedling of a crossing ('202') of the Exeter Elm Ulmus 'Exoniensis' with the Himalayan Elm Ulmus wallichiana at the Dorschkamp Research Institute for Forestry & Landscape Planning, Wageningen. The tree was one of several cultivars prepared for release in 1970, but delayed by the outbreak of the second, far more aggressive strain of Dutch elm disease.

== Description ==
A fast-growing tree with upright branches. The generally ovate leaves are dark-green, glabrescent, < 14 cm in length by 10 cm broad, with a pronounced acuminate apex.

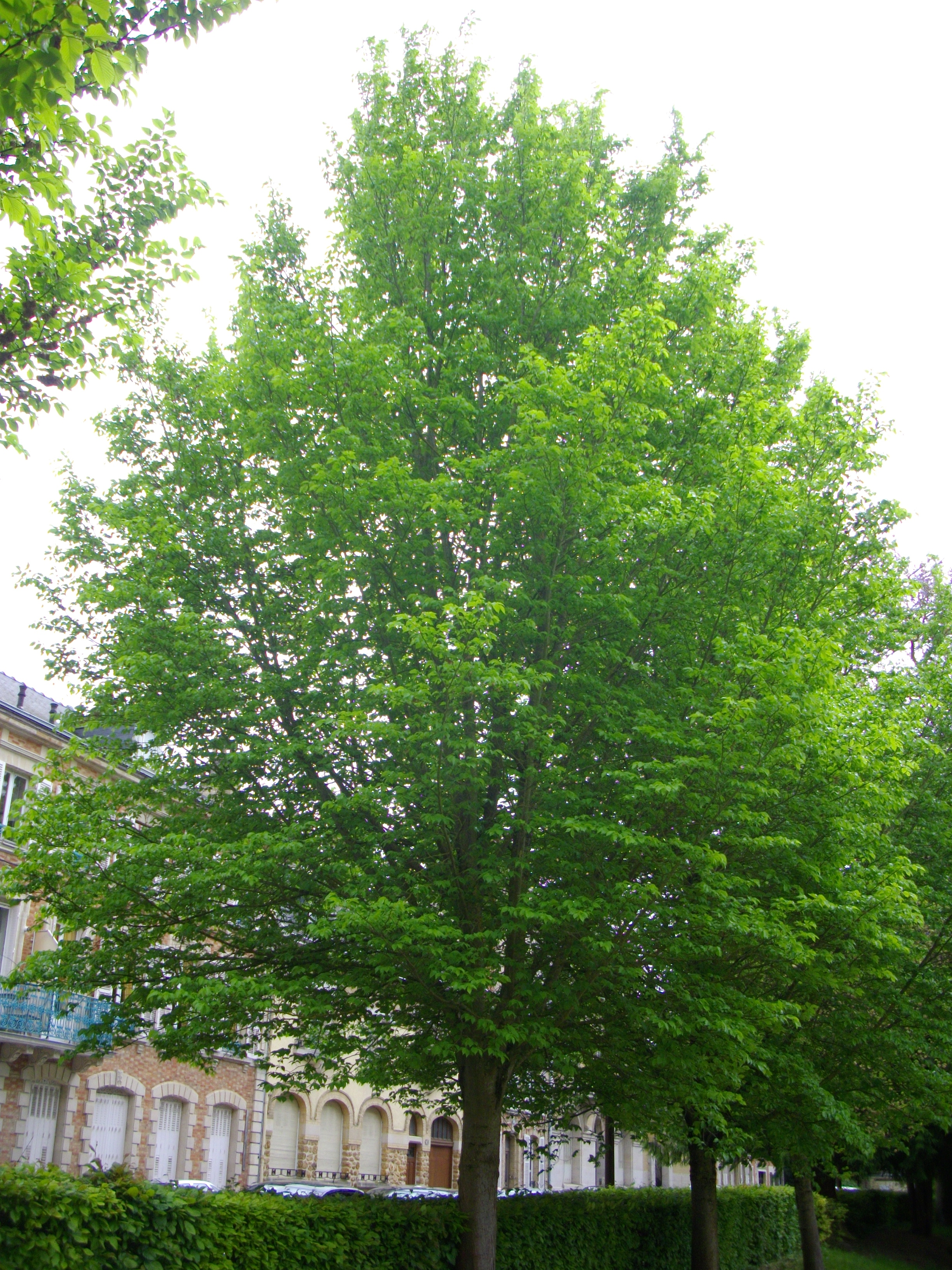
'Dodoens', Châlons-en-Champagne, Marne

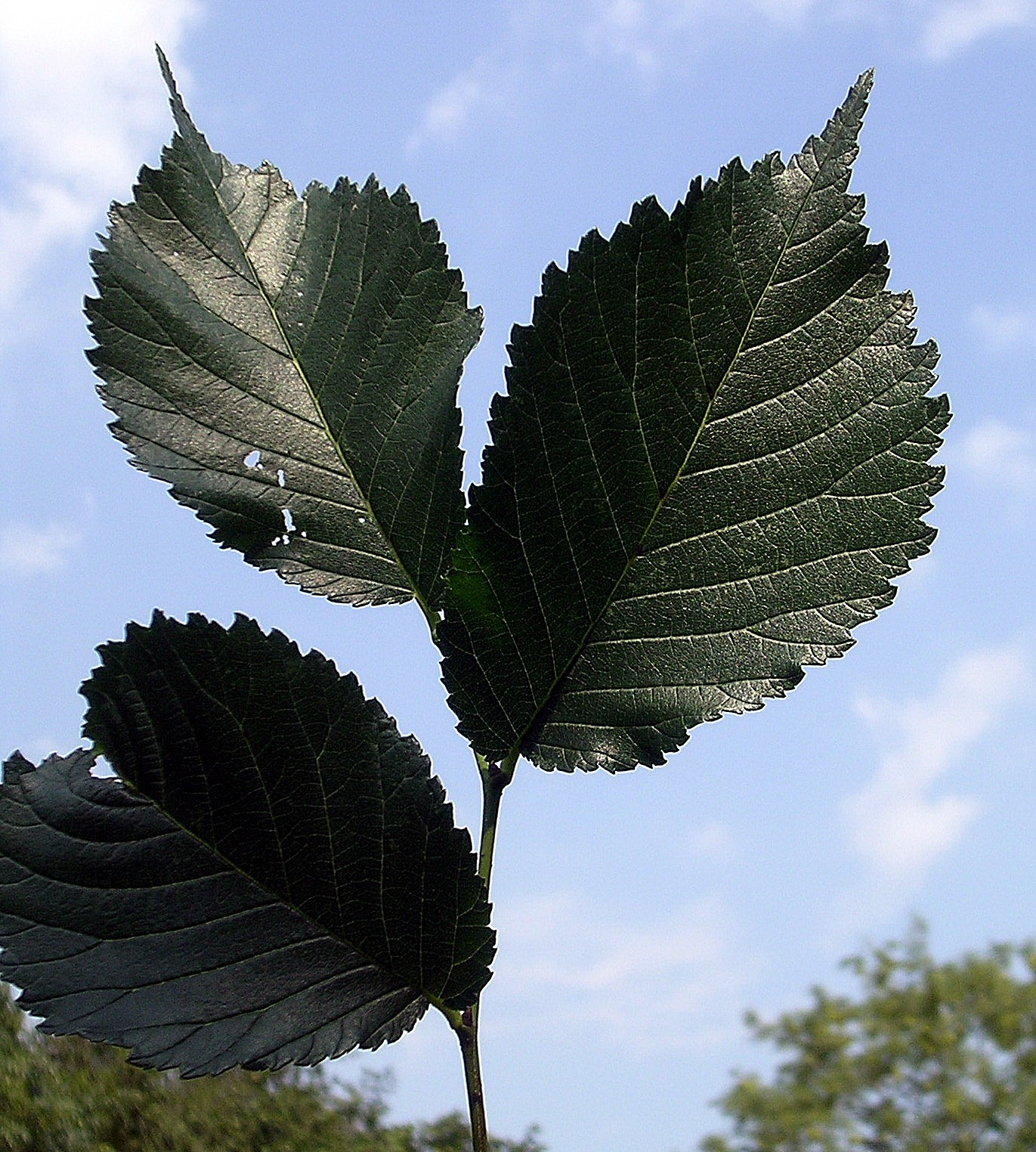
'Dodoens' leaves

== Pests and diseases ==
'Dodoens' has moderately good resistance to Dutch elm disease, rated 4 out of 5.

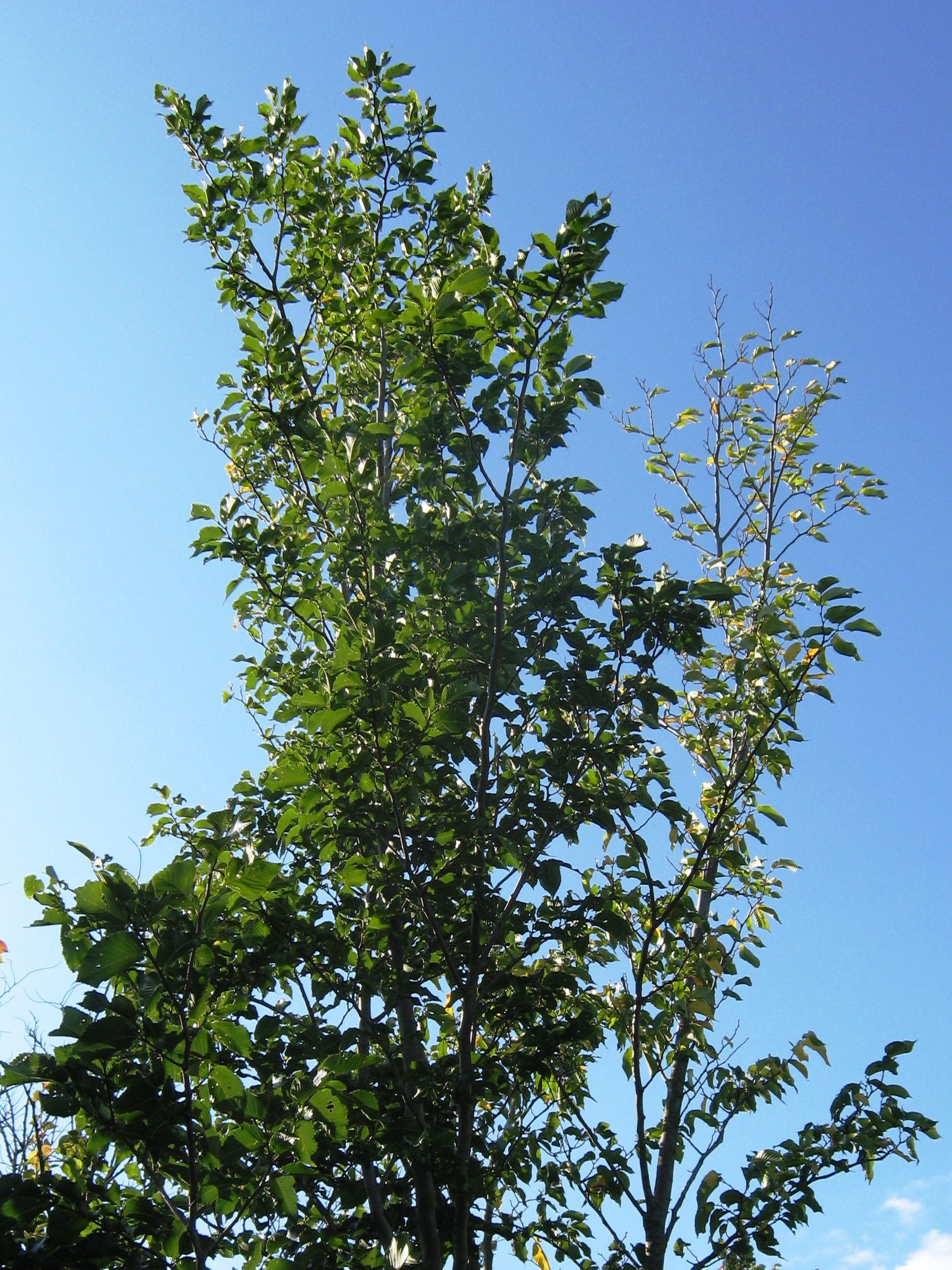
'Dodoens' with DED, Horsea Island, UK

== Cultivation ==
Eventually released in 1973, sales in the Netherlands dwindled from a peak of almost 16,000 in 1979 to 600 in 2004. Although still commercially available in Europe, the tree is no longer recommended for planting wherever the disease remains prevalent. Among plantings in the UK is an avenue of 'Dodoens', planted at 12 years old in 2011, lining the path (2024) along the River Ribble in Miller Park, Preston. 'Dodoens' was originally propagated by grafting onto U. glabra rootstocks, which has proven an unsatisfactory combination in the Netherlands, leading to graft failures in maturity. 'Dodoens' is now grown on its own roots or occasionally on U. 'Stavast'; trees grown by the latter method were planted in the Wijdemeren City Council Elm collection in 2015.

'Dodoens' was included in trials in Canberra, Australia, started in 1988, but has not thrived in that environment, although it prospers further south in the Benalla Botanic Gardens. It is not known to have been commercially released in North America although it was evaluated at the Iowa State University in the early 1970s where it soon perished, unable to tolerate the very cold winters.

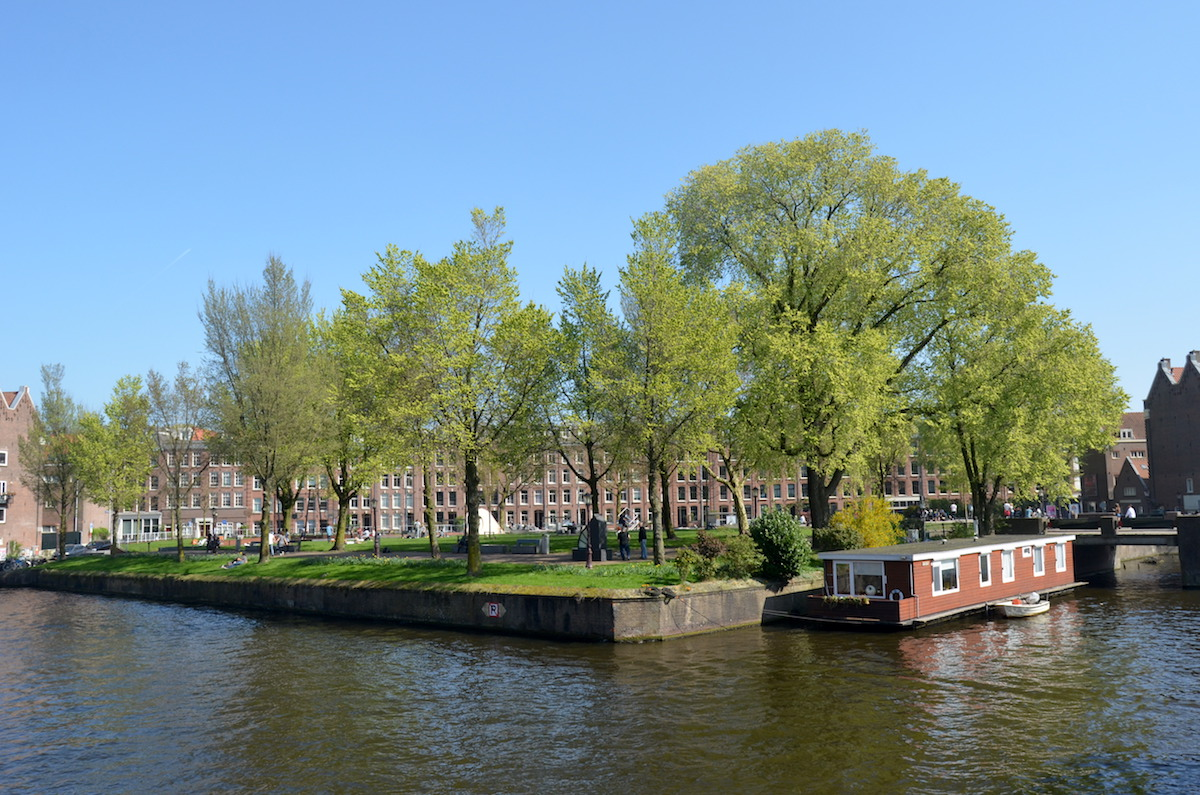
'Dodoens' (left to centre) lining north side of Eerste Marnixplantsoen, Amsterdam, 2017

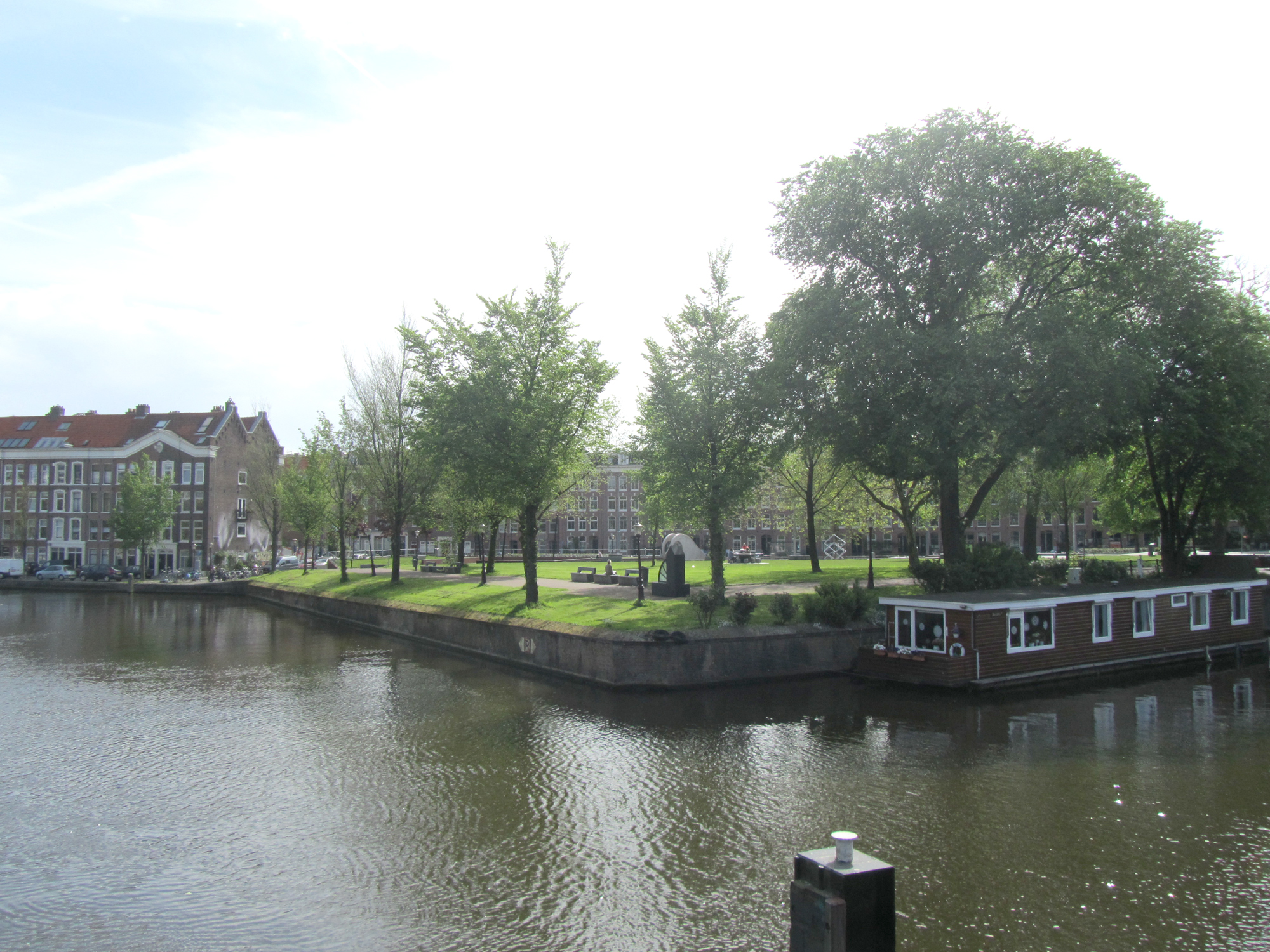
Same, 2012

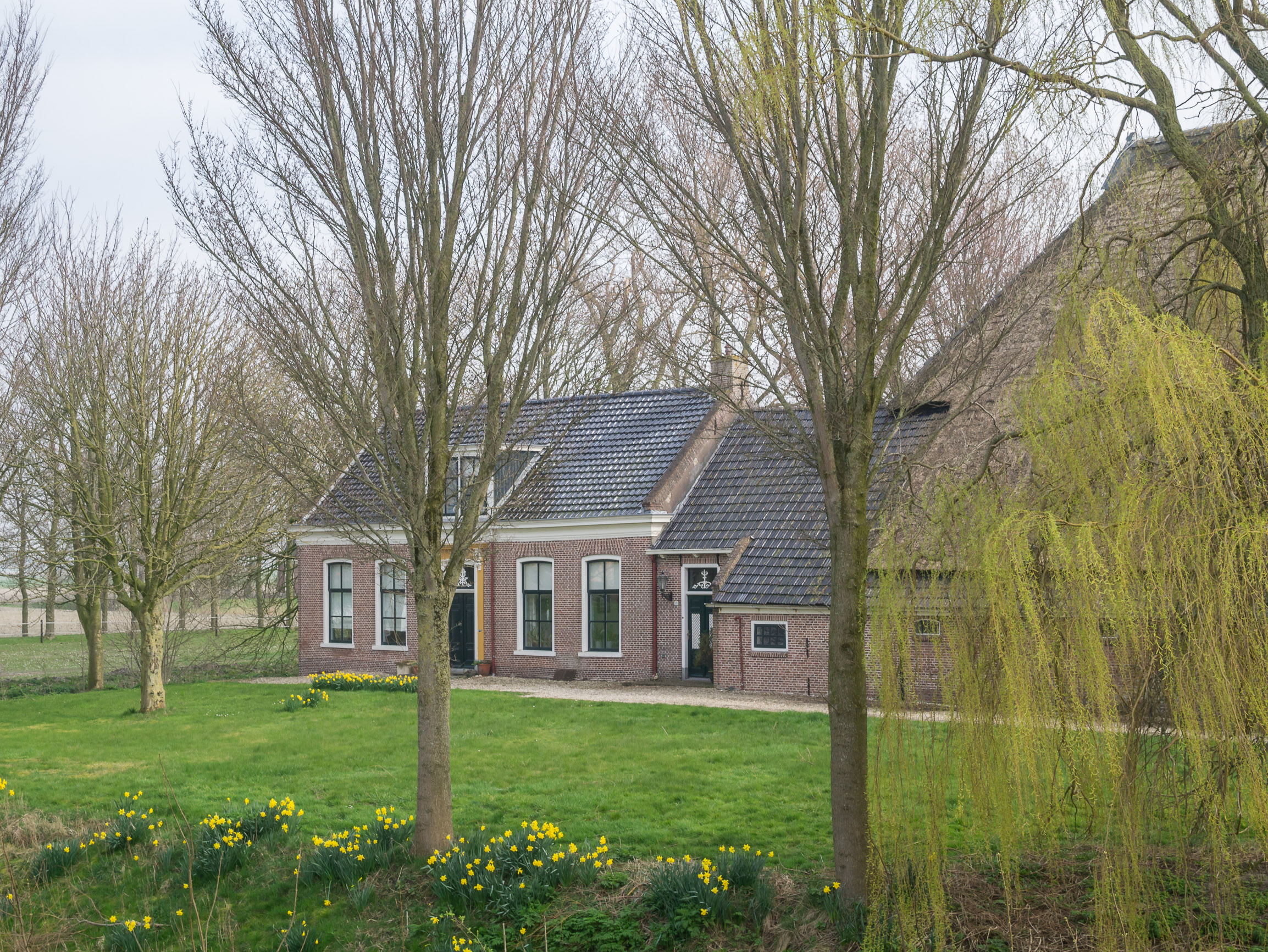
'Dodoens', Sint Annaparochie, Friesland, 2014

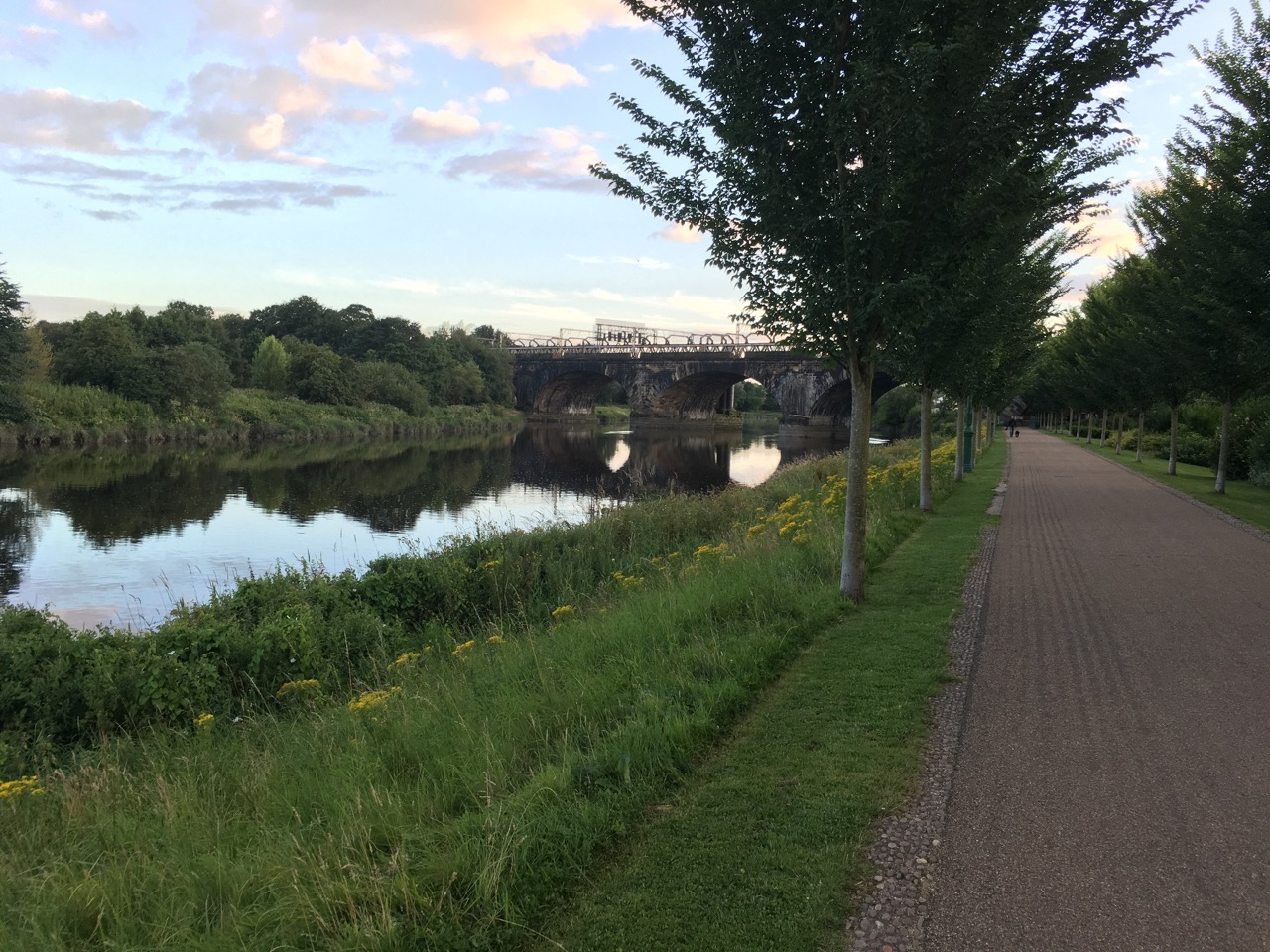
'Dodoens' avenue by the Ribble Viaduct, Miller Park, Preston, Lancashire, 2017

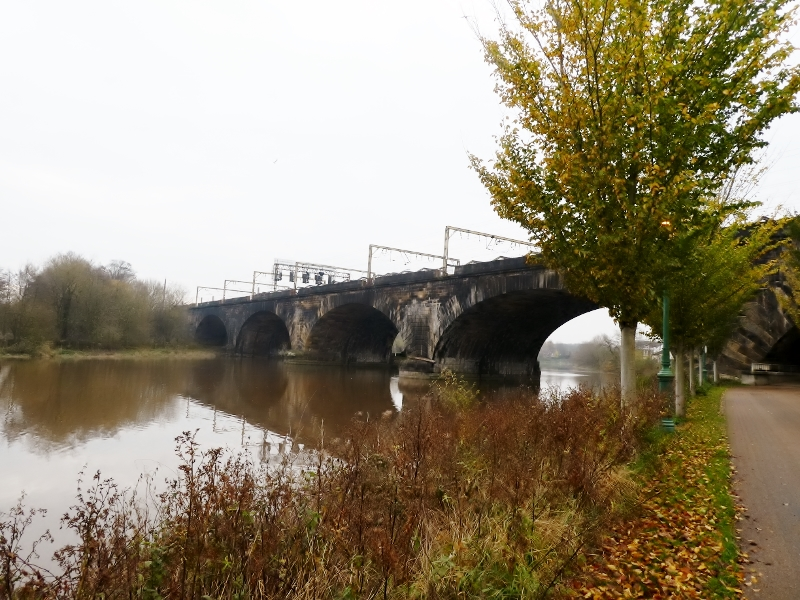
Same, 2018

== Notable trees ==
The UK TROBI Champion grows at the Westonbirt Arboretum; planted in 1980, the tree measured 20 m high by 47 cm d.b.h. in 2009.

== Etymology ==
The cultivar is named for the 16th-century Flemish physician and botanist Rembert Dodoens.

== Accessions ==
=== North America ===
- United States National Arboretum, Washington D.C., US. Acc. no. Q28833 (quarantine)

=== Europe ===
- Arboretum de La Petite Loiterie , Monthodon, France. No details available
- Brighton & Hove City Council, UK. NCCPG Elm Collection. 1 large tree at Stanmer Park Arboretum, planted 1982. Many trees planted around the city.
- Grange Farm Arboretum, Sutton St. James, Spalding, Lincs., UK. Acc. no. 820.
- Royal Botanic Gardens Kew, UK. Acc. nos. 1980-730, 2000-2071, 2001–839.
- Sir Harold Hillier Gardens, UK. Acc. nos. 1982:4060, 1993:1249.
- Westonbirt Arboretum , Tetbury, Glos., UK. Acc. no. 1980/156.
- Wijdemeren City Council, Netherlands. Elm Collection, planted ~1980. Planted mainly in Nederhorst den Berg and Ankeveen.

=== Australasia ===
- Royal Botanic Gardens Victoria (Melbourne), Australia
