= Ulmus 'Berardii' =

Elm cultivar

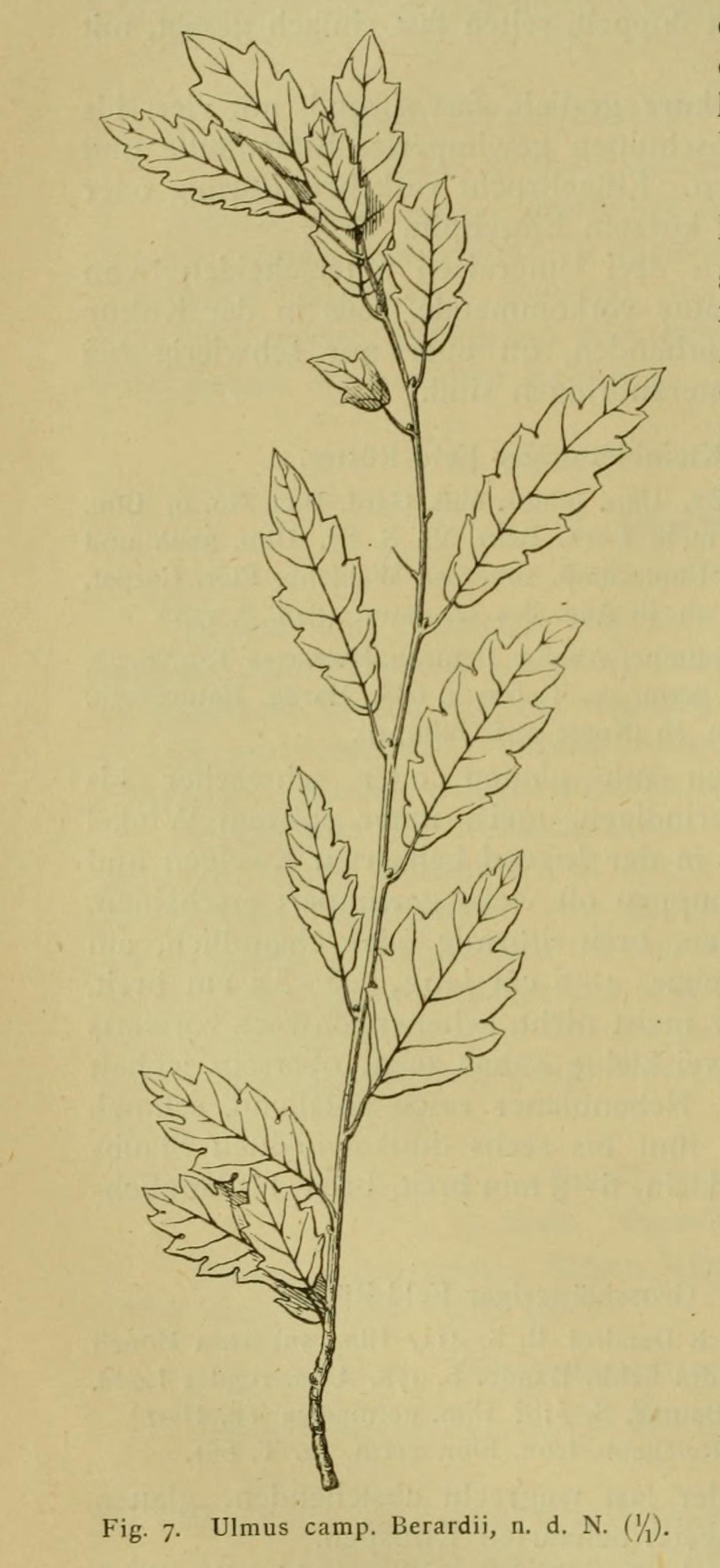
- Leaves of 'Berardii'
- Genus: Ulmus
- Cultivar: 'Berardii'
- Origin: Metz, France

The elm cultivar Ulmus 'Berardii', Berard's Elm, was raised in 1865, as Ulmus Berardi, from seeds collected from large specimens of "common elm" growing on the ramparts at Metz, by an employee of the Simon-Louis nursery named Bérard. Élie-Abel Carrière, the Späth nursery of Berlin, and the Van Houtte nursery of Gentbrugge regarded it as form of a field elm, listing it as U. campestris Berardii, the name used by Augustine Henry. Cheal's nursery of Crawley distributed it as Ulmus nitens [:Ulmus minor] 'Berardii'. Smith's of Worcester preferred the original, non-specific name, Ulmus 'Berardii'.

As with 'Koopmannii', 'Berardii' is treated in some north Eurasian treatises as a cultivar of the Siberian Elm Ulmus pumila. Peter Shaw Green, who had examined dried specimens of the plant, also considered it "as possibly a form of U. pumila". A much re-labelled 1820s' herbarium specimen from the Baikal region of Siberia (one conjecture was "U. siberica var. pumila ?") in the Museum national d'histoire naturelle, Paris, shows 'Berardii'-type leaves, suggesting the possibility of a French cultivation in the early 19th century of a small-leaved U. pumila, later called 'Berardii'. Siberian elms with 'Berardii'-like leaves are present in Russia.

== Description ==
No tree-photographs of 'Berardii' are known, and descriptions of the cultivar vary. It is said to make a bushy shrub or small tree, but these descriptions date from the early decades of its cultivation, and the parent tree was large. Johann Gerd Krüssmann and Green state that it has slender upright branches, whereas Späth described the branches as "overhanging". A 1956 herbarium specimen at the Arboretum national des Barres, Nogent-sur-Vernisson, France, describes the source tree as 5 m tall with hanging branches (it includes a small pencil sketch). The leaves have been described as very small, very dark green (almost black), and glabrous, 12–18 mm long. Some herbarium specimens, however, show leaves up to 4 or 5 cm long, with 1 cm petioles, while Bean gives 1.5 to 4 cm long by 0.7 to 2 cm wide. They have been described as strongly crenated or deeply incised by relatively few teeth (four to seven); some herbarium specimens, however, show shallowly indented margins. The leaf-base is cuneate and almost symmetrical. The petioles and new shoots are downy. The leaves have been likened to those of Planera crenata, and to those of Zelkova × verschaffeltii. Krüssmann noted that 'Berardii' is late to come into leaf, Carrière that it holds its leaves late into autumn.

Samarae do not appear in any known 'Berardii' herbarium specimens. From their early dates, some of these are likely to show untypical juvenile leaves.

Huberty (1904) stated that there were variegated forms of 'Berardii'.

== Pests and diseases ==
Auguste Chevalier noted that 'Berardii' was one of four European cultivars found by researchers in The Netherlands to have significant resistance to the earlier strain of Dutch elm disease prevalent in the 1920s and '30s, the others being 'Exoniensis', 'Monumentalis' Rinz and 'Vegeta'. The four were rated less resistant than U. foliacea clone 23, from Spain, later cultivated as 'Christine Buisman'.

== Cultivation ==
Carrière noted that the original stock plant was still present in the Simon-Louis nursery in 1887. A specimen was grown at Kew Gardens, obtained from the Späth nursery before the First World War. One tree, supplied by Späth, was planted in 1893 at the Dominion Arboretum in Ottawa, Canada. Three specimens were supplied by Späth to the Royal Botanic Garden Edinburgh in 1902, and may survive in Edinburgh, as it was the practice of the Garden to distribute trees about the city. 'Berard's Elm', a "small tree, slender in growth, with leaves finely cut", was introduced to the USA c.1871, appearing in the catalogues of the Mount Hope Nursery (also known as Ellwanger and Barry) of Rochester, New York, and of Kelsey's, New York. A specimen stood in the New York Botanical Garden in the early 20th century, and one in the Arboretum national des Barres, Nogent-sur-Vernisson, France, in the mid 20th century. The tree is not known to remain in cultivation, though 51 specimens were reported from the Jūrmalas park in Liepāja, Latvia.

=== Putative 'Berardii' ===
An old non-suckering elm in the garden of the Bank of Scotland HQ, Edinburgh, which produces a very small number of 'Berardii'-like leaves among more regular ones, holds its leaves late like 'Berardii', and, in its form, recalls the 'Berardii' sketch and tracery from des Barres, may be one of Späth's 1902 three. It is known that Späth re-sourced some of his elms, rather than cloning them from nursery-stock – his U. campestris cornubiensis is not type-Cornish, his Ulmus campestris viminalis is not 'Viminalis' Loudon, and his Ulmus 'Tiliaefolia' is not 'Tiliaefolia' Host. The original trees were still present on the ramparts at Metz when Späth began cultivating his clone, which he renamed U. campestris Berardii. At least one 'Berardii' herbarium specimen appears to show that the zelkova-like leaves are not unvarying.

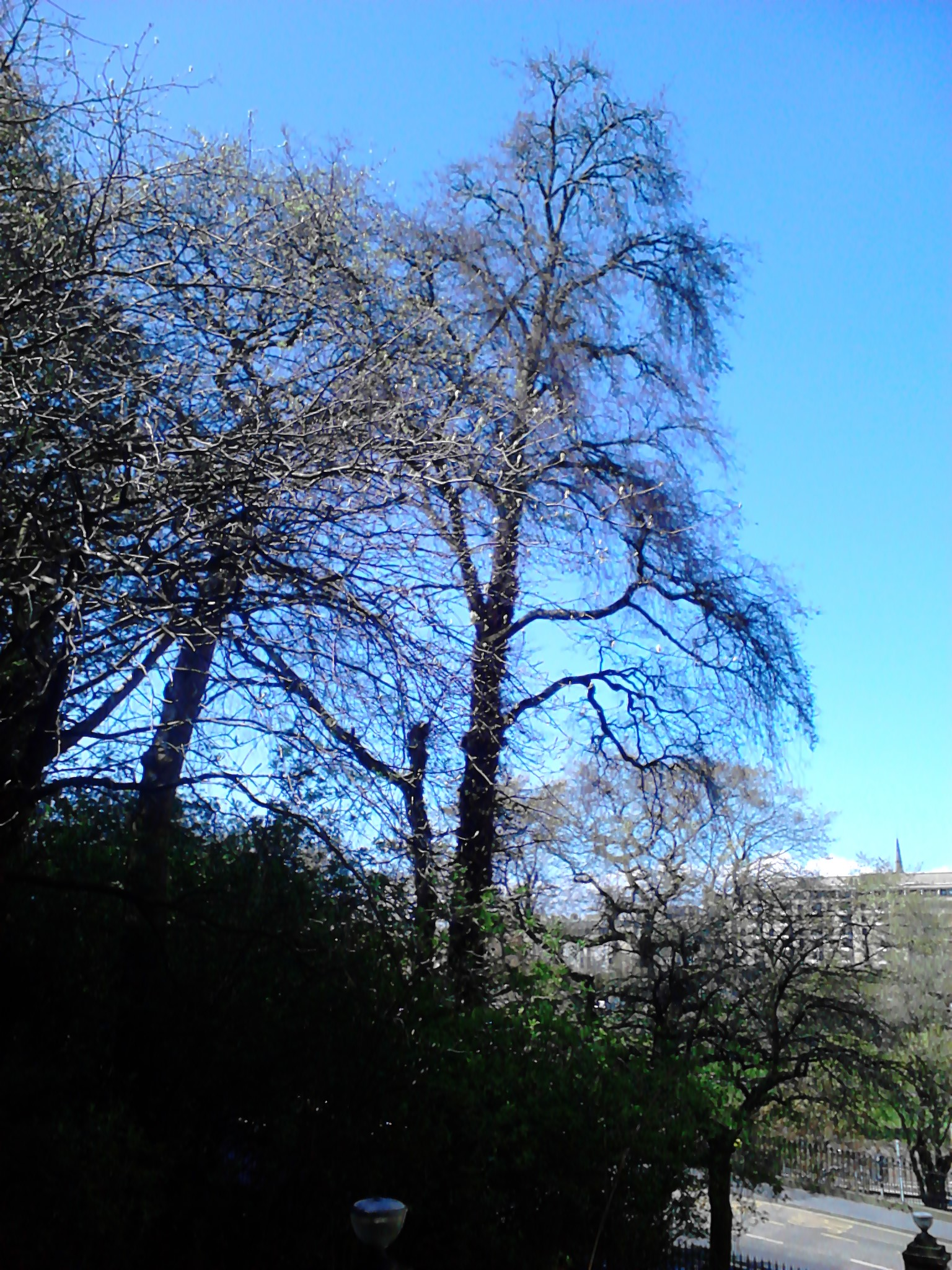
Bank of Scotland HQ elm, April

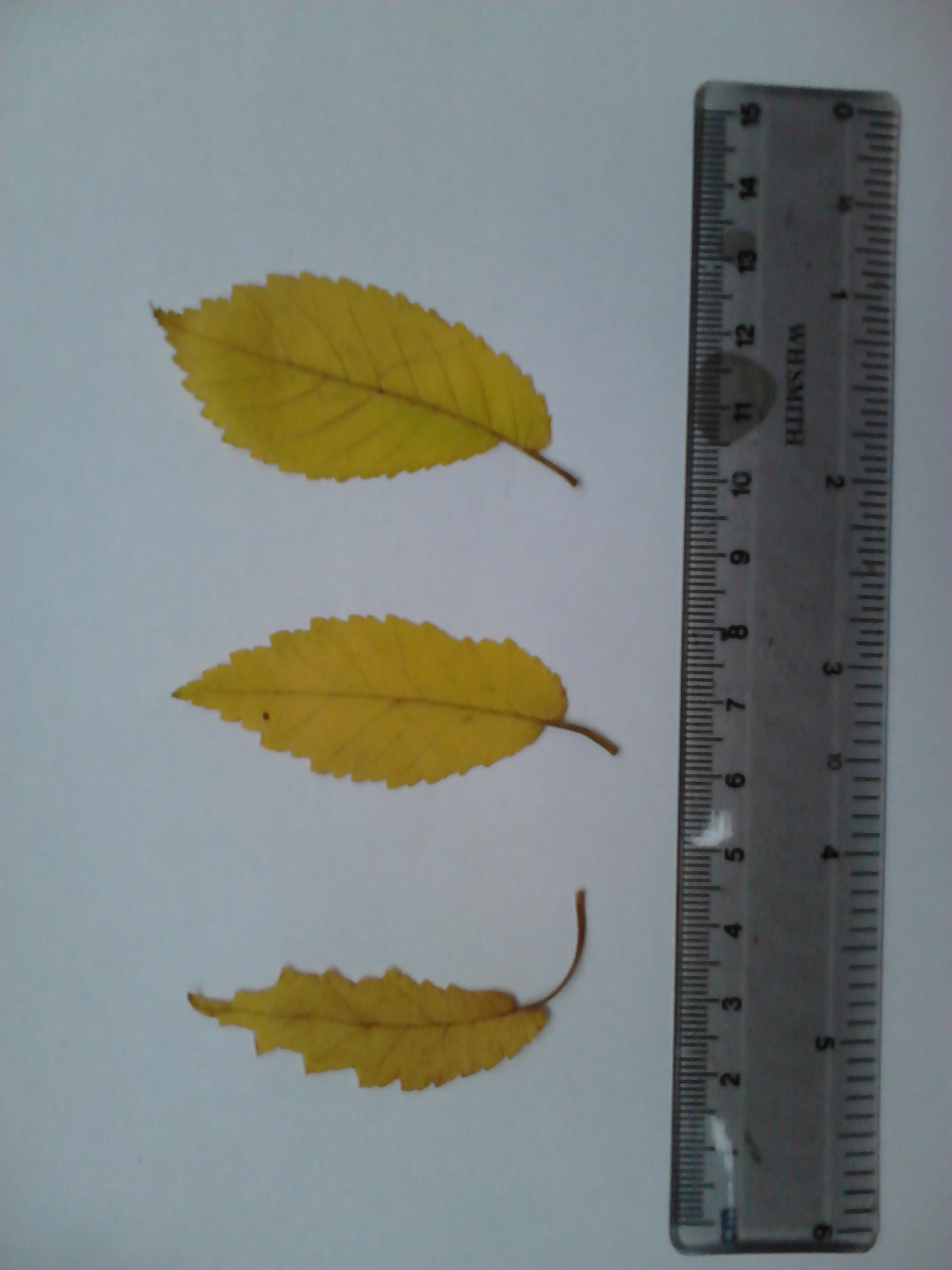
'Berardii'-like leaf (bottom)

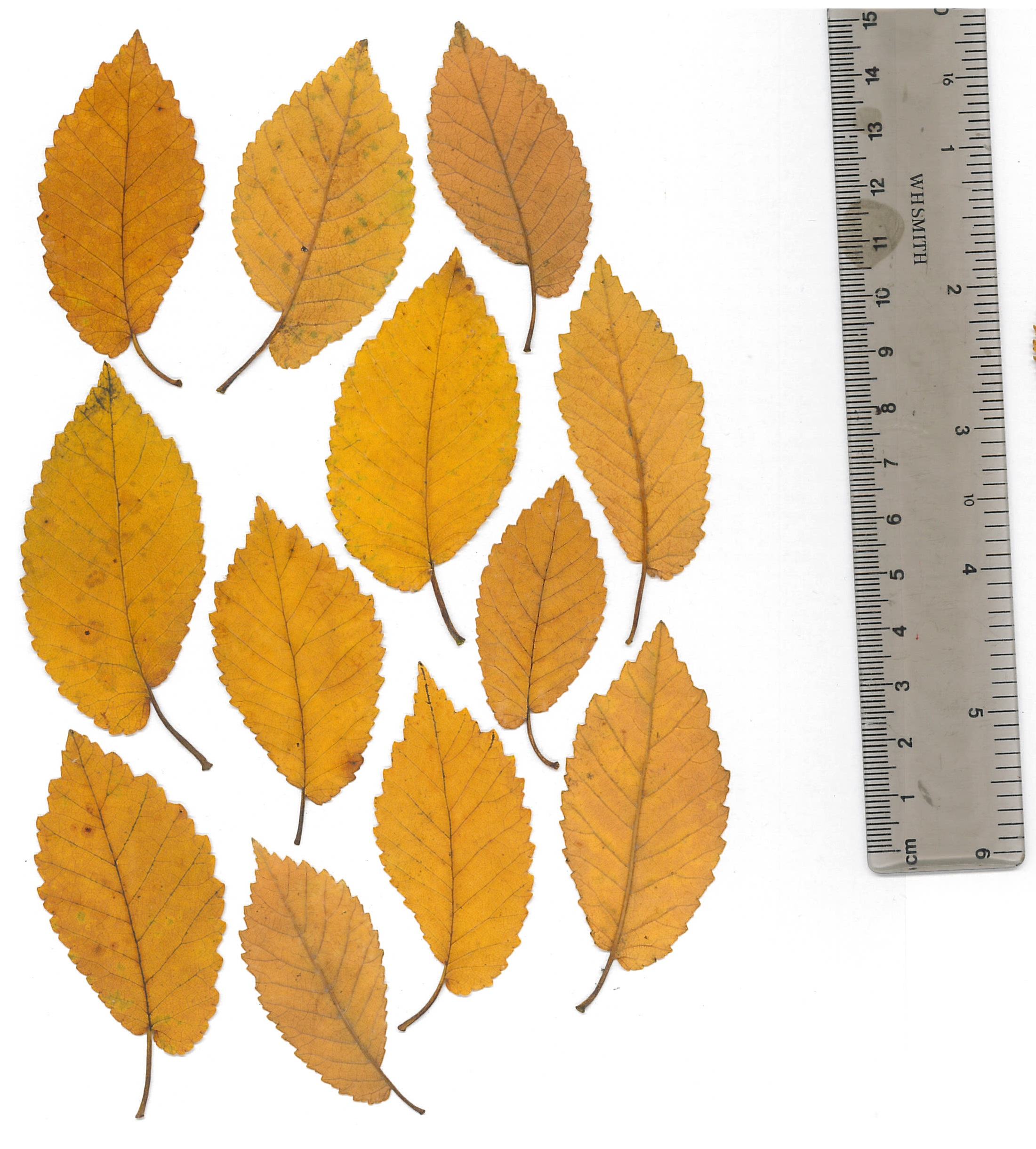
Regular leaves

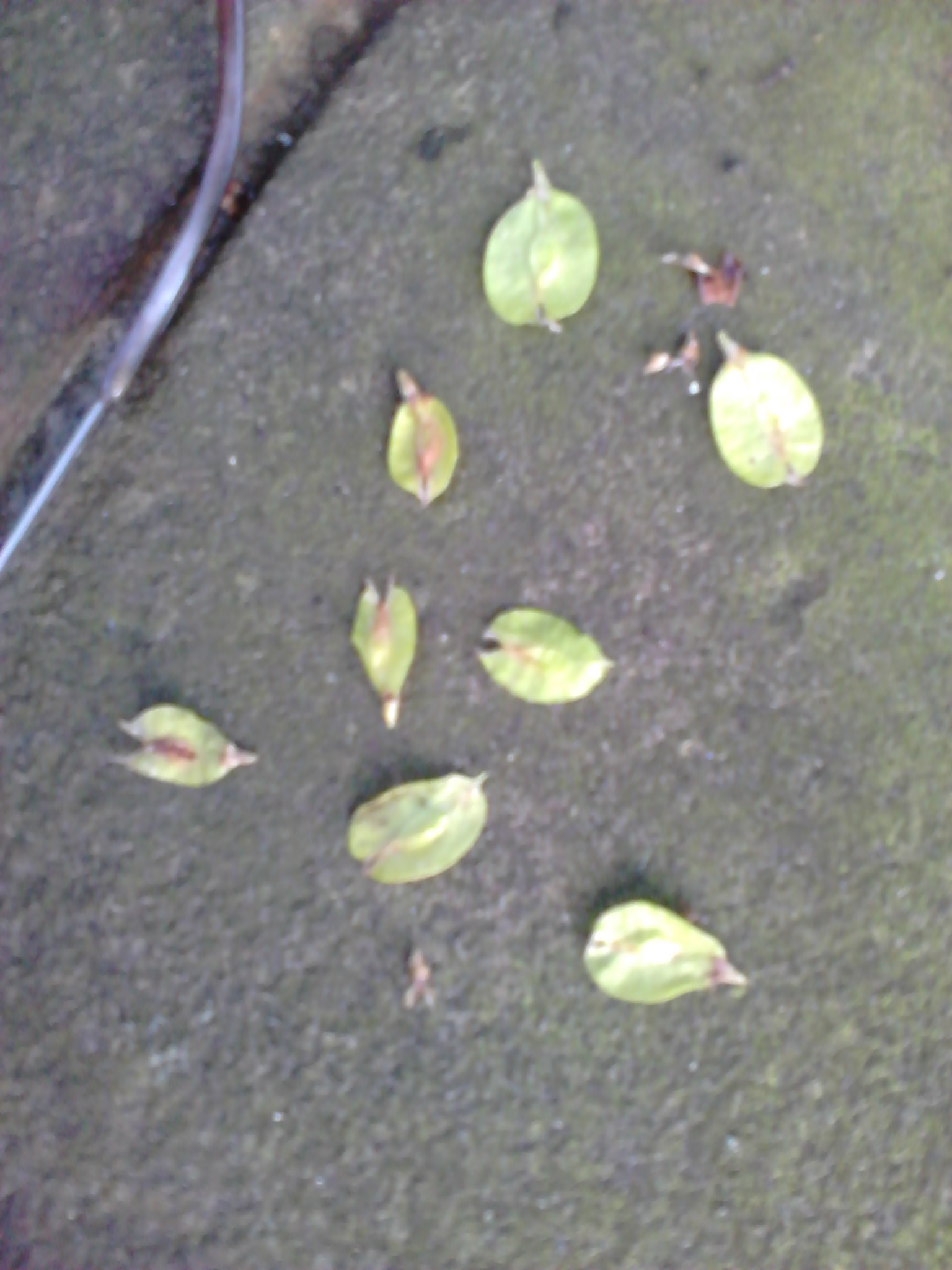
Samarae of same

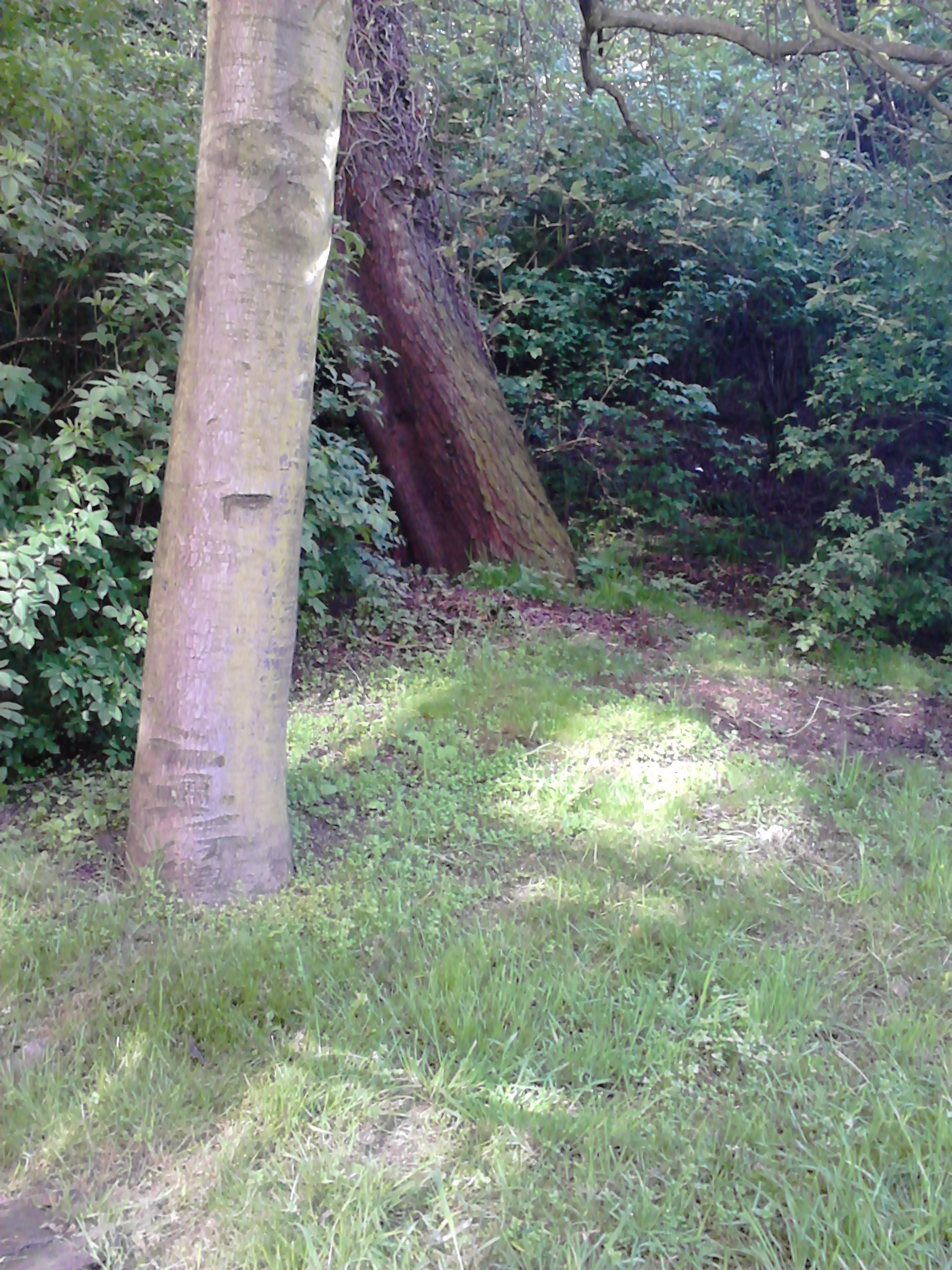
Bole of same (right)

== Synonymy ==
- Ulmus berardii: Simon-Louis Catalogue, 1869, p. 96. fig. 7.
