= Ulmus minor 'Monumentalis' =

Elm cultivar

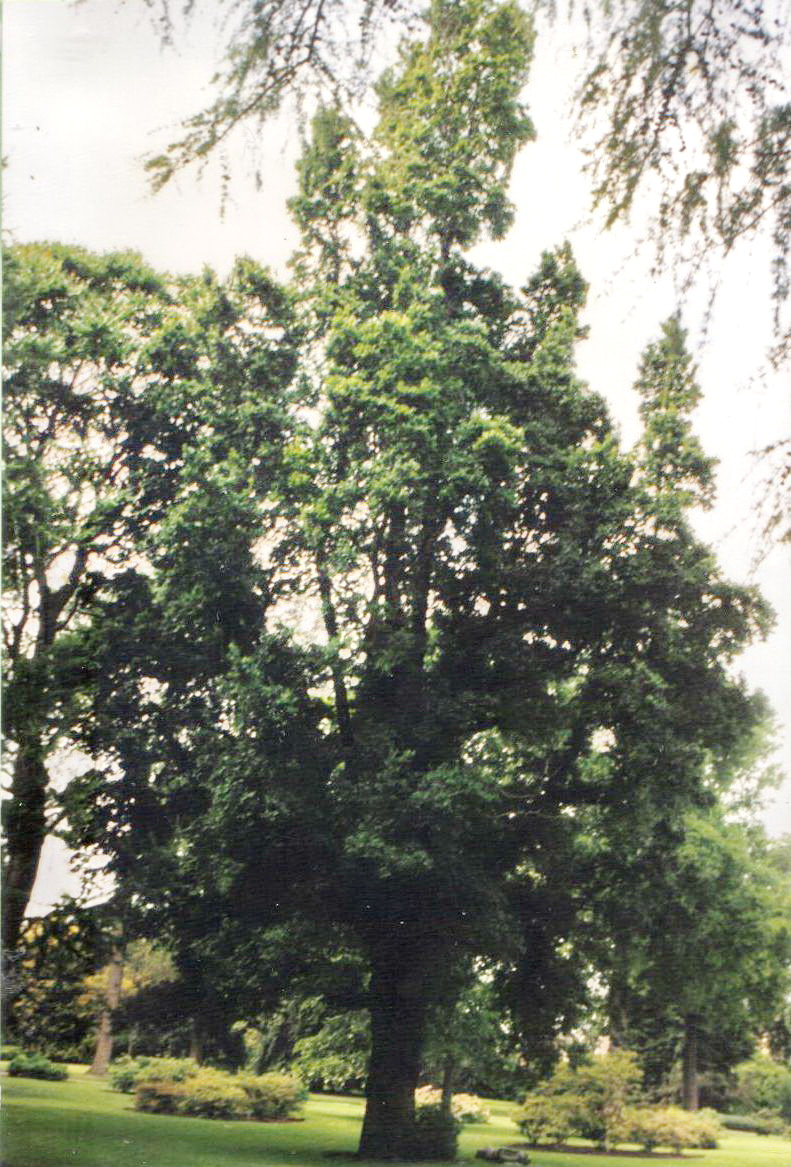
- 'Monumentalis' Rinz, Royal Botanic Garden Edinburgh (1989)
- Species: Ulmus minor
- Cultivar: 'Monumentalis'
- Origin: Rinz, Frankfurt

The Field Elm cultivar Ulmus minor 'Monumentalis', or tomb elm (Grabmal-Rüster), was raised as a sucker of U. suberosa by Sebastian Rinz, the city gardener of Frankfurt, before 1855 and listed by the Jacob-Makoy nursery of Liège in their 1861 catalogue as Ulmus monumentalis Rinz, "a new variety". Kirchner (1864) described it (as U. campestris var. monumentalis Rinz, 'Pyramid Field Elm'), confirming that it had only recently been propagated by Rinz and established in the nursery. It was distributed from the 1880s by the Baudriller nursery, Angers, by the Späth nursery, Berlin, and by Smith's of Worcester, as U. campestris monumentalis Rinz., appearing separately in their catalogues from U. minor 'Sarniensis', the Guernsey or Wheatley Elm, with which, according to Henry (1913), it was early confused on the continent. 'Sarniensis' is known as monumentaaliep [:monumental elm] in The Netherlands. Like Henry, Springer (1932) had stressed that the Dutch monumentaaliep was "not the actual monumentaaliep (U. glabra Mill var. monumentalis Rinz) but U. glabra Mill. var. Wheatleyi Sim. Louis", and that it "should be renamed U. glabra Mill. var. monumentalis Hort. (non Rinz)". By the late 20th century, however, Rinz's 'Monumentalis' had been all but forgotten, Fontaine (1968) and Krüssmann (1984), for example, giving 'Monumentalis' as a synonym of 'Sarniensis'.

Rinz gave his tree the name 'Monumentalis' for its columnar form, and, according to Beissner (1889), because the parent tree stood near the Monument of the Landgrave of Hesse (Hessenmonument) on the former glacis, which is now located in the city at Frankfurt. The German name 'Tomb Elm' may have arisen from the tree's similarity in form to cypress, a burial-ground tree in parts of Europe.

== Description ==
Rinz reported that tree did not grow tall, and in the early days some nurseries referred to it as a "dwarf" elm. Kirchner (1864) described 'Monumentalis' as a pyramidal field elm with a few upright main branches and numerous weak, short side-branches. The small, very rough leaves form a dark green foliage "that appears to hug the trunk". 'Monumentalis' was described by Beissner (1904) as a columnar form of suberose field elm with short, crowded, contorted branches and dense, often twisted black-green leaves, a tree of "a very peculiar monstrous appearance". Henry described it as "a columnar tree with a few upright main branches and numerous short twigs bearing dense crowded dark green leaves". Späth's catalogue likewise described the tree as having a dense upright shape.

Heike in Die Gartenkunst (1908) described 'Monumentalis' as "strictly pyramidal", and 'Wheatleyi' ('Sarniensis') as "similar, but [with] a wider, loose crown."

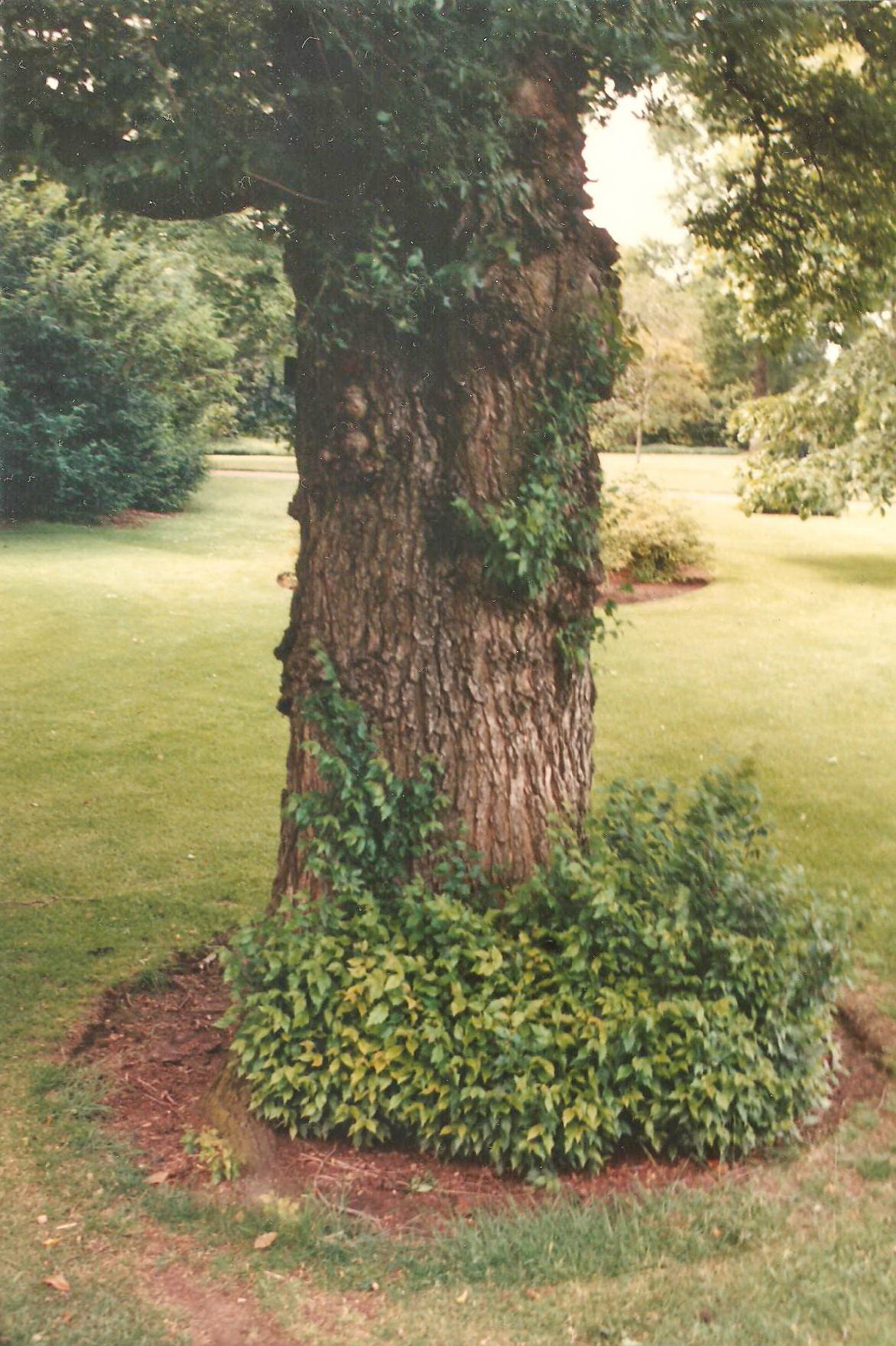
Bark of 'Monumentalis', RBGE tree C2713 (1989) (see 'Cultivation')

'Monumentalis' (tree C2713), RBGE azalea lawn, seen from south-east (1990s)

== Pests and diseases ==
Field Elm cultivars are susceptible to Dutch elm disease. Chevalier noted (1942) that 'Monumentalis' Rinz was one of four European cultivars found by researchers in The Netherlands to have significant resistance to the earlier strain of Dutch elm disease prevalent in the 1920s and '30s, the others being 'Exoniensis', 'Berardii' and 'Vegeta'. The four were rated less resistant than U. foliacea clone 23, from Spain, later cultivated as 'Christine Buisman'.

== Cultivation ==
No surviving specimens are known, but a non-grafted field elm cultivar would be expected to regenerate through root-suckers. Three specimens were supplied by Späth to the Royal Botanic Garden Edinburgh in 1902 as U. campestris monumentalis, Späth's name for Rinz's tree. One was planted in the garden proper on the azalea lawn as tree C2713, a suckering, narrow-pyramidal or columnar elm resembling a wild cypress (about 11 m tall by the late 1990s), with twisted, dense upright branching and small dark-green leaves. By 1958, when Melville examined it, its cultivar name had been dropped because 'Monumentalis' was by then assumed to be a synonym of 'Sarniensis'. Melville determined it U. carpinifolia × U. plotii × U. glabra. The leaves were pilose above and rather distorted, the lower surface with a zone of dense hair towards the base of the midrib. The tree was one of the first RBGE elms into leaf. The other two from Späth, or regrowth from them, may survive in Edinburgh, as it was the practice of the Garden to distribute trees about the city (viz. the Wentworth Elm); the current list of Living Accessions held in the Garden per se does not list the plant. Elsewhere, U. campestris monumentalis appeared separately from U. campestris sarniensis in the early 20th-century catalogue of the Ryston Hall arboretum, Norfolk, whose elms were supplied by Späth. One tree from Späth was planted in 1893 as U. campestris monumentalis at the Dominion Arboretum, Ottawa, Canada. The tree was present in The Hague in the 1930s, listed as 'Monumentalis Rinz' and distinguished from 'Wheatley'.

Introduced to the USA, U. campestris monumentalis appeared in the catalogues of the Mount Hope Nursery (also known as Ellwanger and Barry) of Rochester, New York, in 1871; in 1898 the nursery described their 'Monumentalis' as "a dwarf" and "conical in habit". The cultivar was also marketed by Trumbull and Beebe's nursery, San Francisco, in the 1890s, as "Monumental elm: a slow-growing dwarf variety, forming a sort of dense and straight column; distinct and beautiful". It appeared in the 1904 catalogue of Kelsey's, New York, and in the 1909 catalogue of the Bobbink and Atkins nursery, Rutherford, New Jersey, in separate entries from Wheatley Elm, as U. monumentalis, 'Monumental Elm', "a small variety, slow and dense of growth".

An elm in Gloucester Place, Brighton, listed by Brighton and Hove Council in 2025 as 'Monumentalis' without provenance information, lacks the dense foliage of Rinz's tree, and it flushes later in spring than the cultivar.
