= Ulmus minor 'Atinia Pyramidalis' =

Elm cultivar

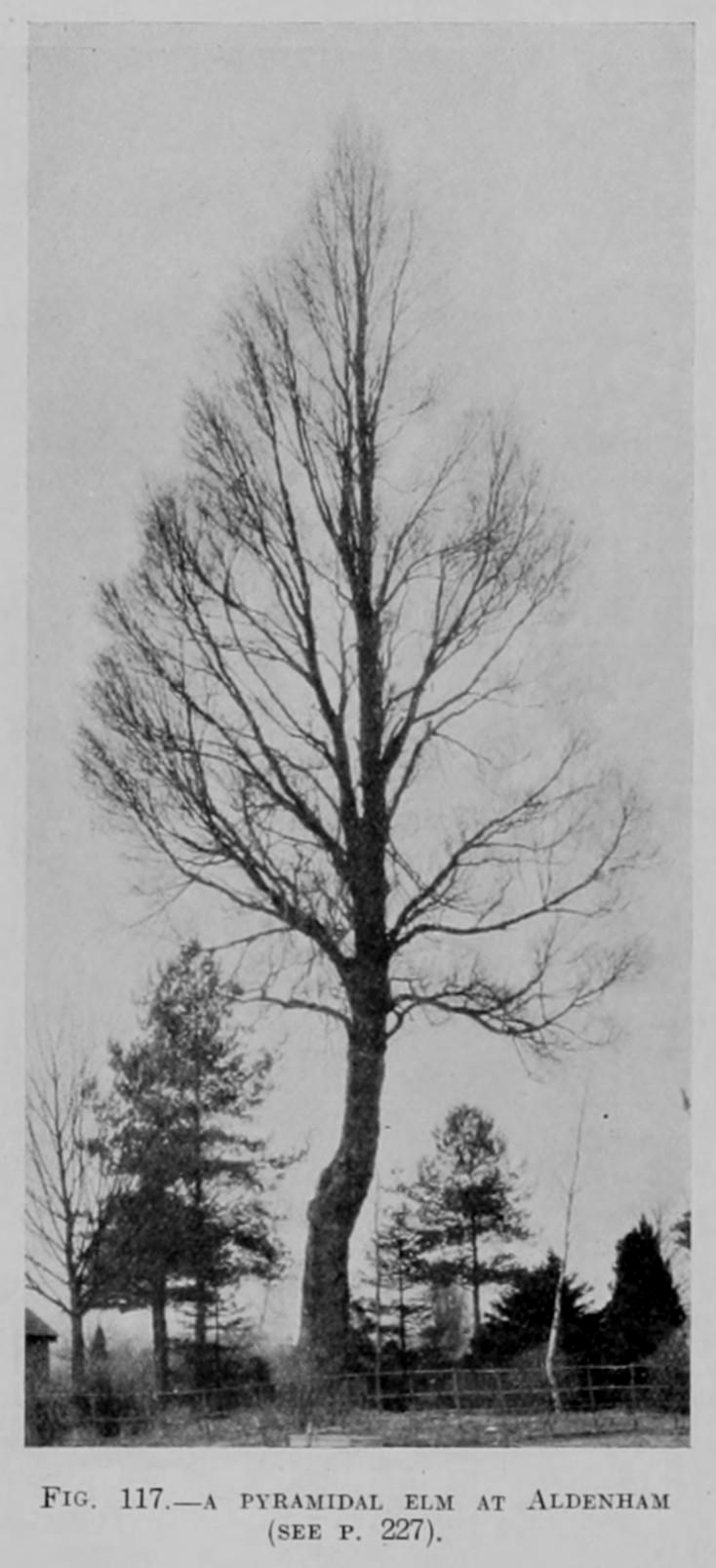
- 'Atinia Pyramidalis', Aldenham, c.1922
- Species: Ulmus minor
- Cultivar: 'Atinia Pyramidalis'
- Origin: UK

The Field Elm cultivar Ulmus minor 'Atinia Pyramidalis', was first described as U. campestris pyramidalis by Vicary Gibbs in the Gardeners' Chronicle (1922). 'Pyramidalis' reportedly originated from a bud sport of "common elm" (English Elm) at Gibbs' Aldenham estate, Hertfordshire, England, c. 1890.

Not to be confused with the cultivar known as pyramidalm 'pyramid elm' in Scandinavia, which is trimmed Exeter Elm.

== Description ==
As implied by the epithet, the cultivar was pyramidal in shape. Gibbs described the Aldenham specimen as 85 to 90 ft. tall by 1922.

== Pests and diseases ==
See under English Elm.

== Cultivation ==
The extent of cultivation is unknown. No specimens are known to survive.
