= Ulmus 'Exoniensis' =

Elm cultivar

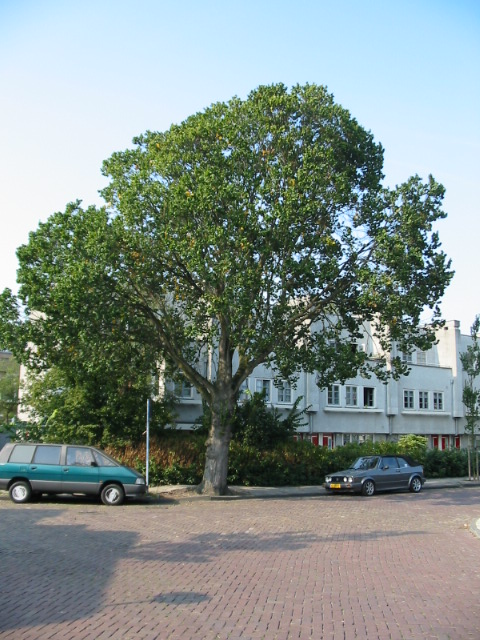
- Exeter Elm in Amsterdam
- Genus: Ulmus
- Cultivar: 'Exoniensis'
- Origin: Exeter, England

Ulmus 'Exoniensis', the Exeter elm, was discovered near Exeter, England, in 1826, and propagated by the Ford & Please nursery in that city. Traditionally believed to be a cultivar of the Wych Elm U. glabra, its fastigiate shape when young, upward-curving tracery, small samarae and leaves, late leaf-flush and late leaf-fall, taken with its south-west England provenance, suggest a link with the Cornish Elm, which shares these characteristics. The seed, however, is on the stalk side of the samara, a feature of wych elm and its cultivars, whereas in hybrids it would be displaced towards the notch.

== Description ==
The tree initially has an upright, columnar form, but later develops a large rounded crown and occasionally reaches 17 m in height. Older specimens may develop pendulous branches. Exeter Elm is chiefly distinguished by its contorted leaves, < 11 cm long by 8 cm broad, rounder than the type [wych] and with more laciniate margins, which occasionally wrap around the branchlets and remain thus well into winter. The samara is narrower than type wych. 'Exoniensis' is often pollarded to produce a denser, fan-shaped crown (see main picture).

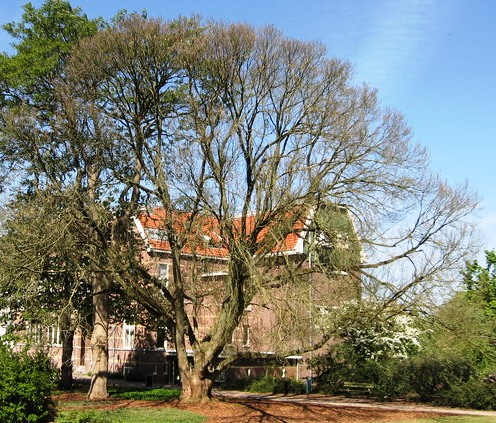
'Exoniensis' in April

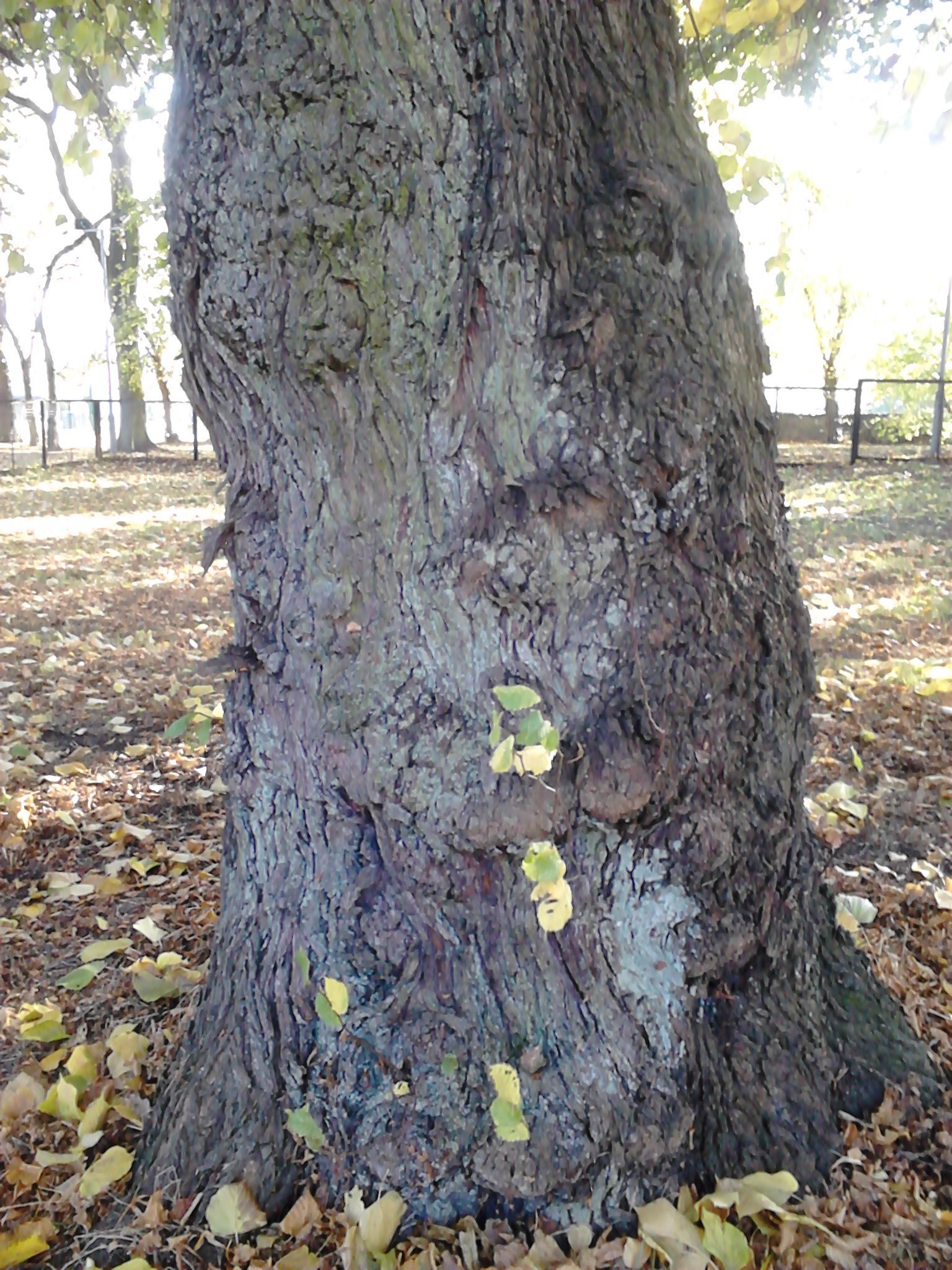
Bole of Exeter Elm

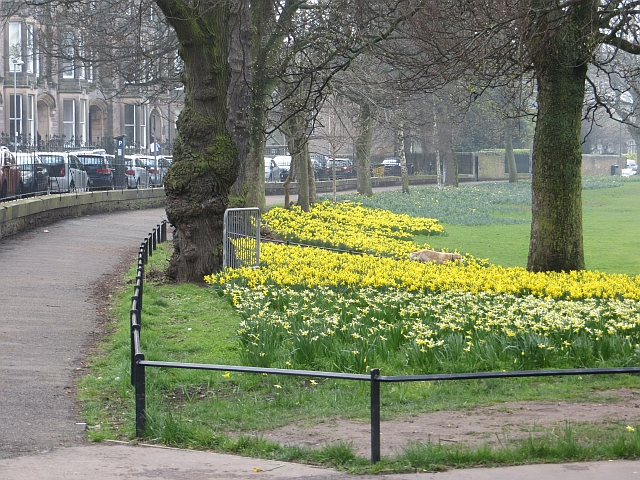
Characteristic bole-burls of Exeter elm (left), Bruntsfield Links, Edinburgh

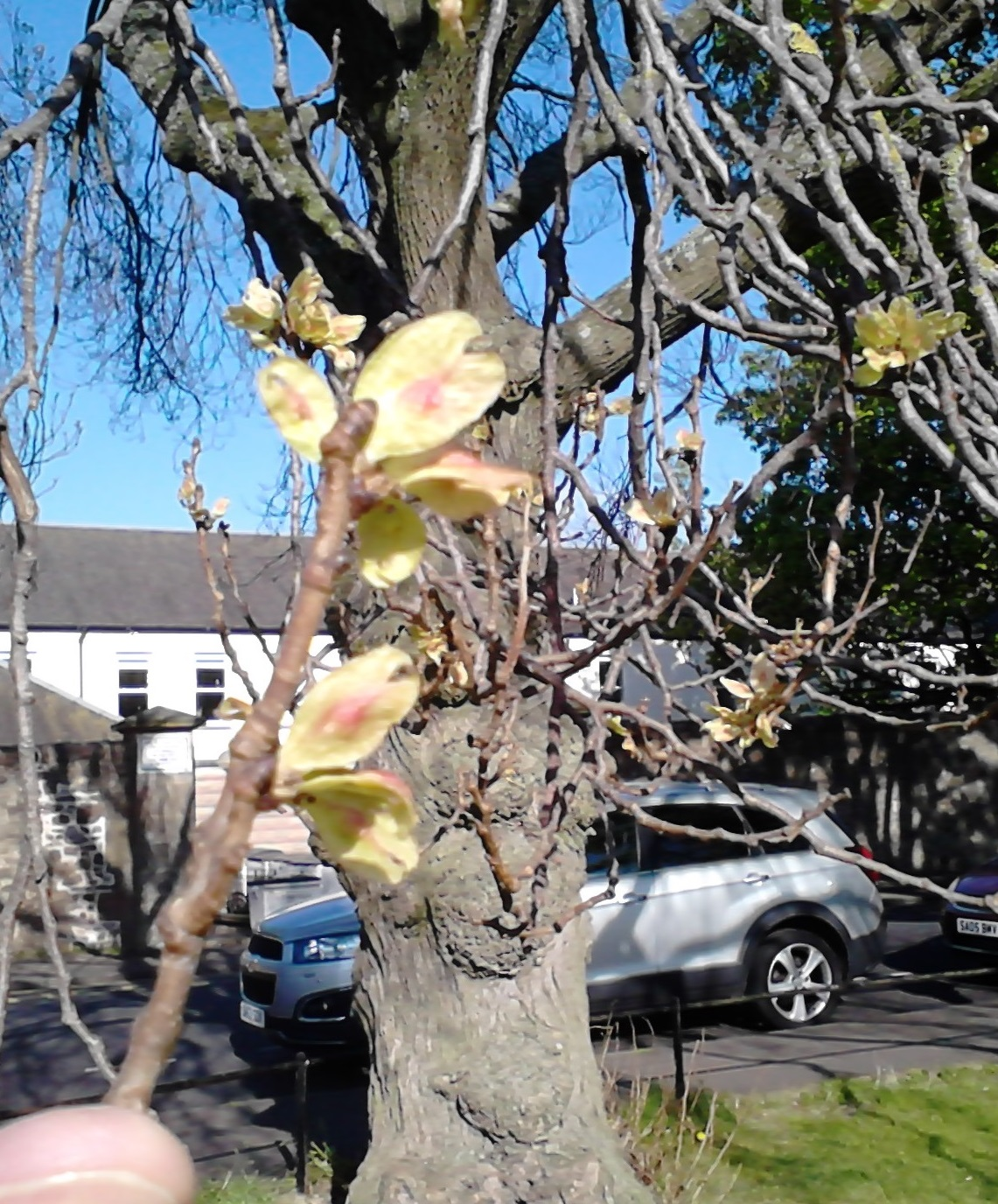
'Exoniensis' samarae

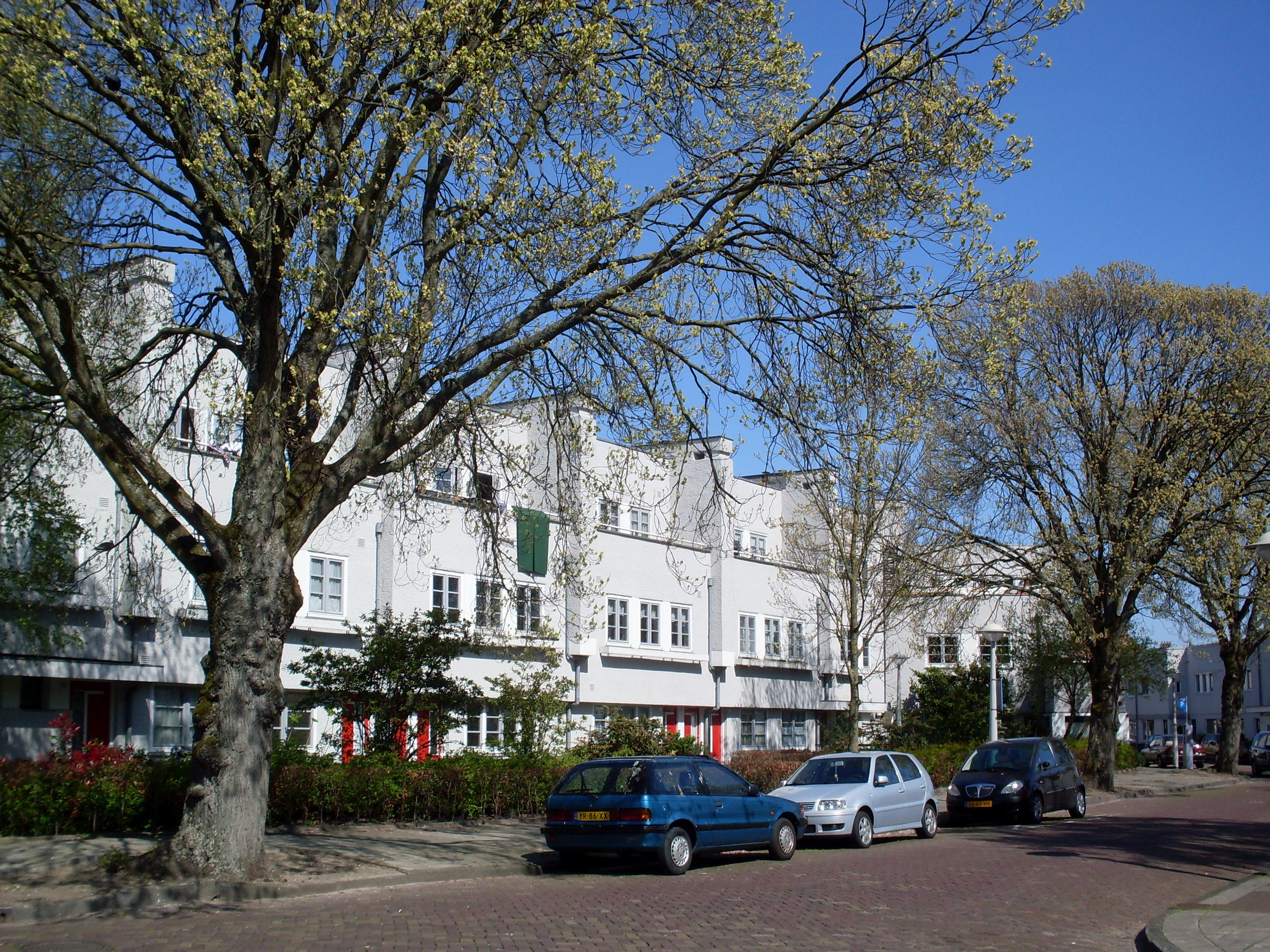
'Exoniensis' fruiting, late April, the Brink, Betondorp, the Netherlands (2014)

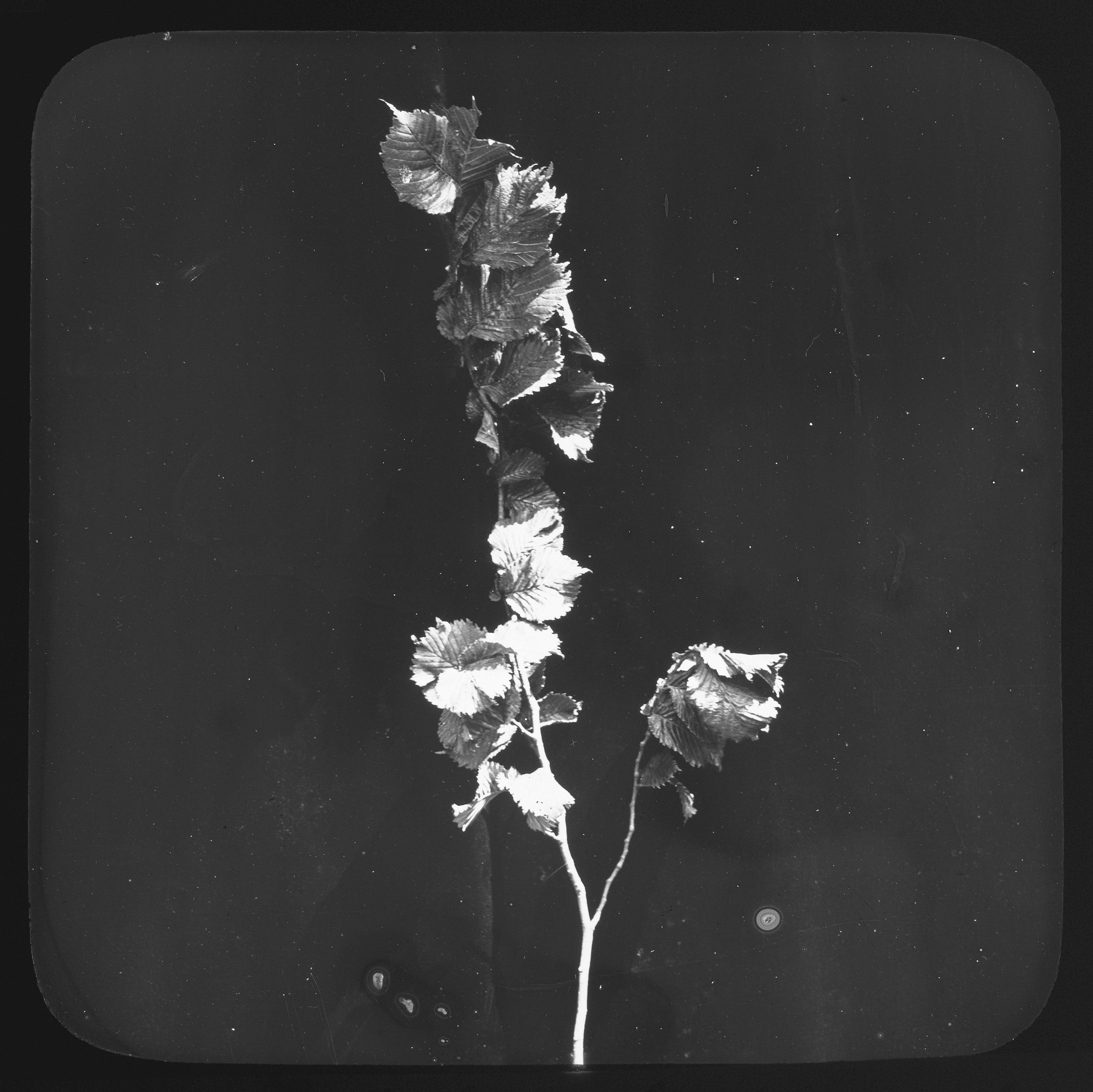
'Exoniensis' foliage

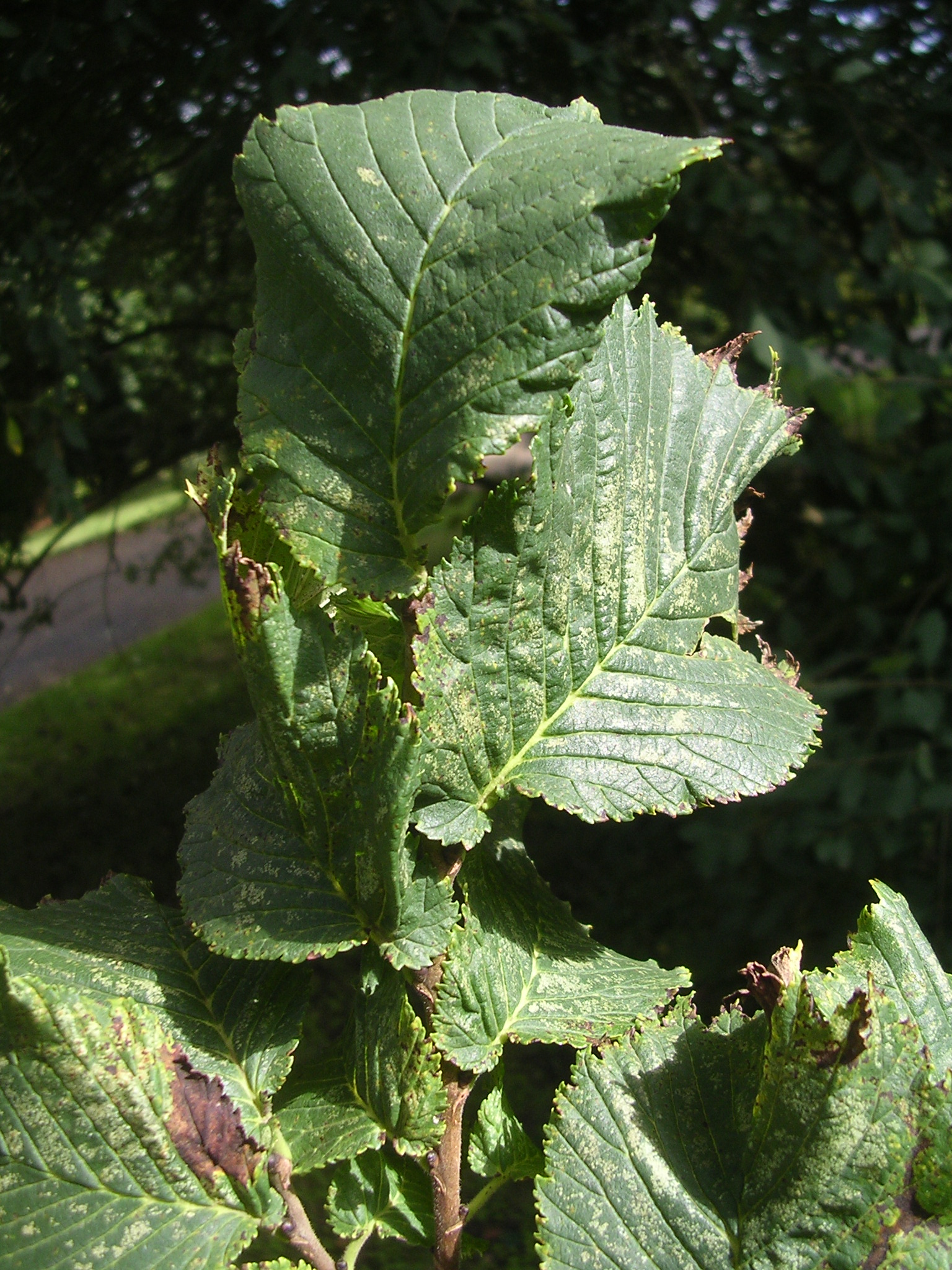
'Exoniensis' foliage

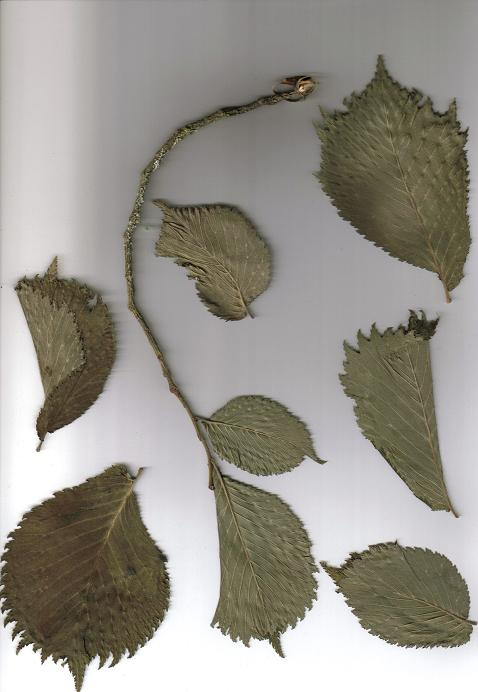
Dried 'Exoniensis' leaves

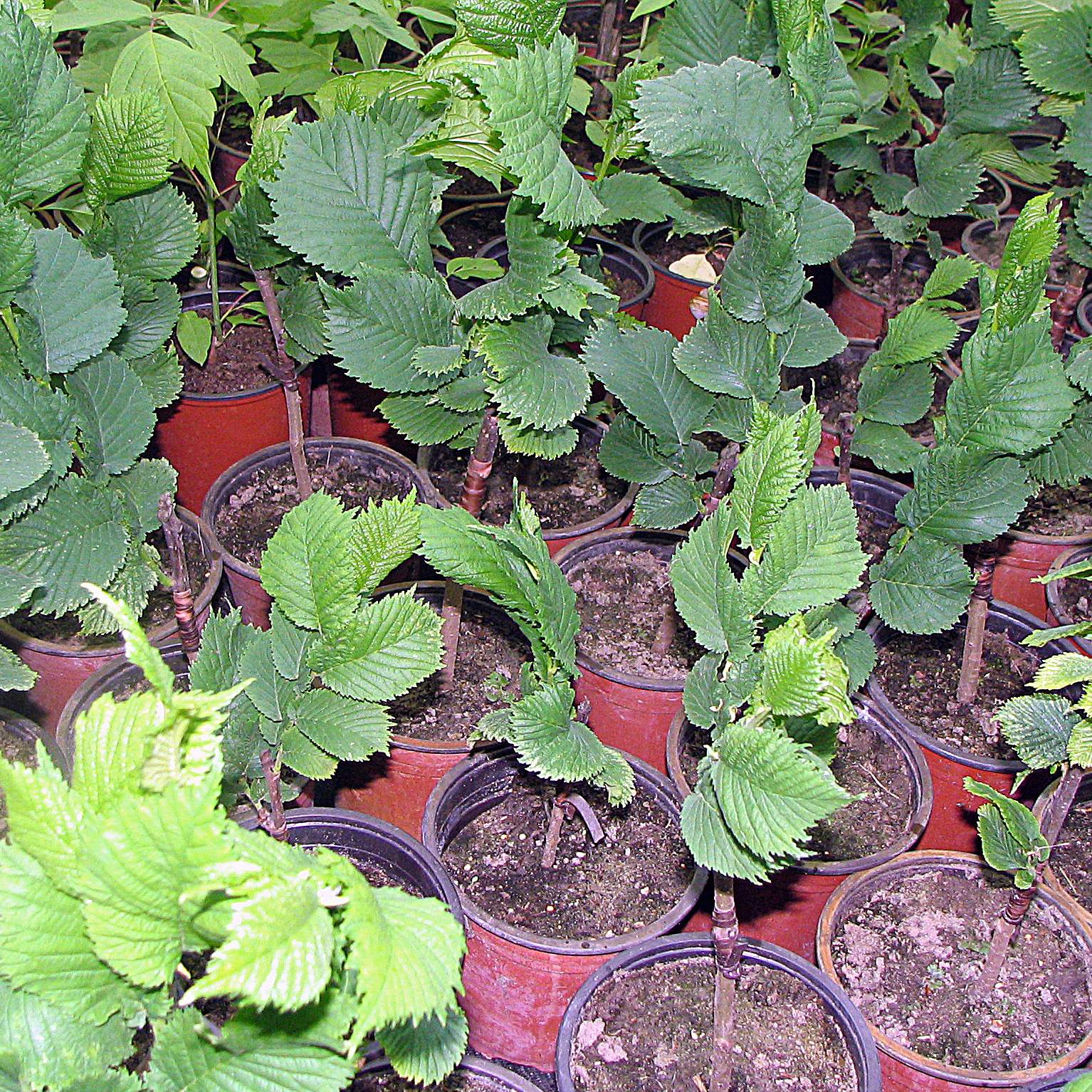
'Exoniensis' scion grafted on U. minor stock

== Pests and diseases ==
Chevalier noted (1942) that Ulmus montana fastigiata (Exeter Elm) was one of four European cultivars found by researchers in The Netherlands to have significant resistance to the earlier strain of Dutch elm disease prevalent in the 1920s and '30s, the others being 'Monumentalis' Rinz, 'Berardii' and 'Vegeta'. The four were rated less resistant than U. foliacea clone 23, from Spain, later cultivated as U. minor 'Christine Buisman'. 'Exoniensis' possesses a moderate resistance to the more virulent strain of Dutch elm disease, and consequently often featured in the Dutch elm breeding programme in association with the Field Elm (U. minor) and Himalayan Elm (U. wallichiana).

== Cultivation ==
Once commonly planted in the UK and parts of western Europe, notably in the Netherlands (as pluim-iep, plume-elm), and in Stockholm, Sweden, 'Exoniensis' is also known to have been marketed in Poland in the 19th century by the Ulrich nursery, Warsaw, and remains in commerce there. The Späth nursery of Berlin cultivated the tree as U. montana fastigiata (U. exoniensis Hort.) from the early 20th century. It is possible that three trees supplied by the Späth nursery to the Royal Botanic Garden Edinburgh in 1902 as U. montana fastigiata were Exeter Elm, old specimens of which survive in Edinburgh (one each in Drummond Place Gardens and Lochend Park). Among plantings of Exeter elm in Turku, Finland, are three old trees in front of the city hall, on the river Aura. The tree is still occasionally cultivated in the Netherlands, one being planted in Molenmeent, Loosdrecht, in 2021, as part of Wijdemeren City Council's elm collection.

'Exoniensis' is found in Australia at the Ballarat Botanical Gardens where it is listed on the Significant Tree Register of the National Trust. An Ulmus plumosa (a synonym of 'Exoniensis' in continental Europe), of "elegant and pyramidal shape" and "dark green foliage", appeared in the 1902 catalogue of the Bobbink and Atkins nursery, Rutherford, New Jersey.

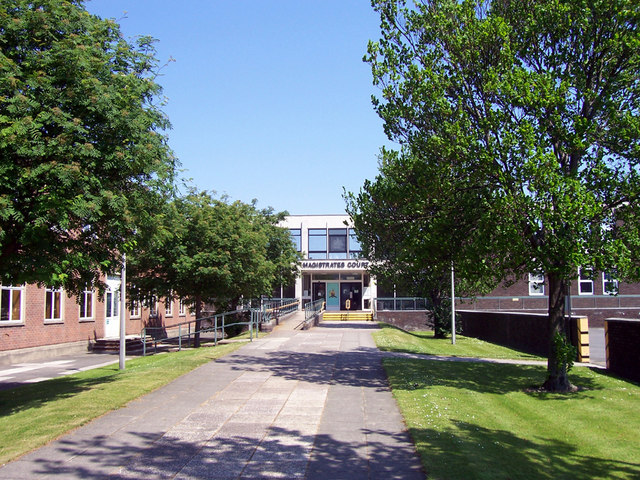
Exeter elms (right), Grimsby Magistrates Court, Lincolnshire (2009)

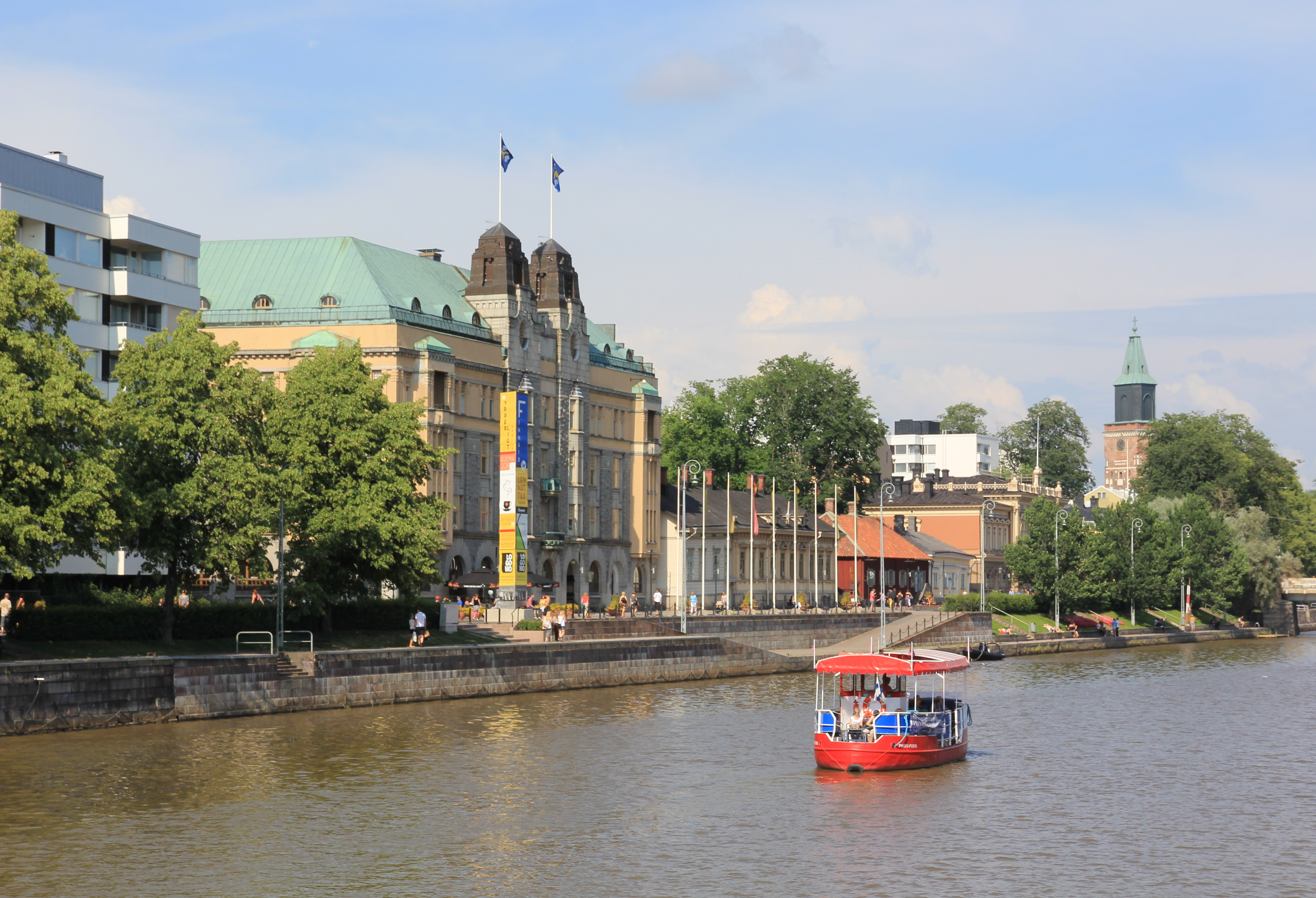
Three Exeter elms (bottom right) before the City Hall, Turku, Finland (2011)

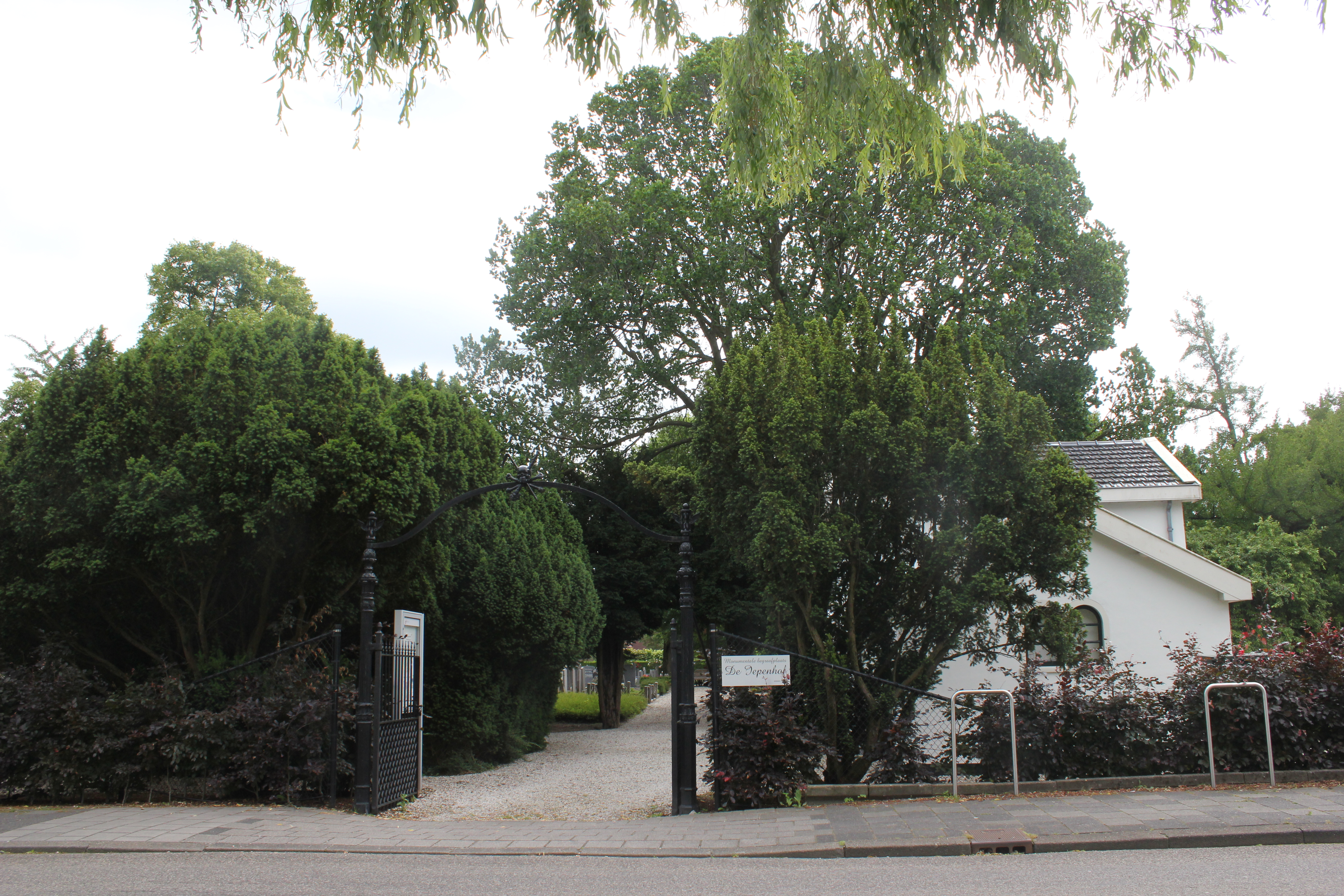
Exeter elm (background), De Iepenhof [: elmcourt] cemetery, Hoofddorp, Netherlands (2016)

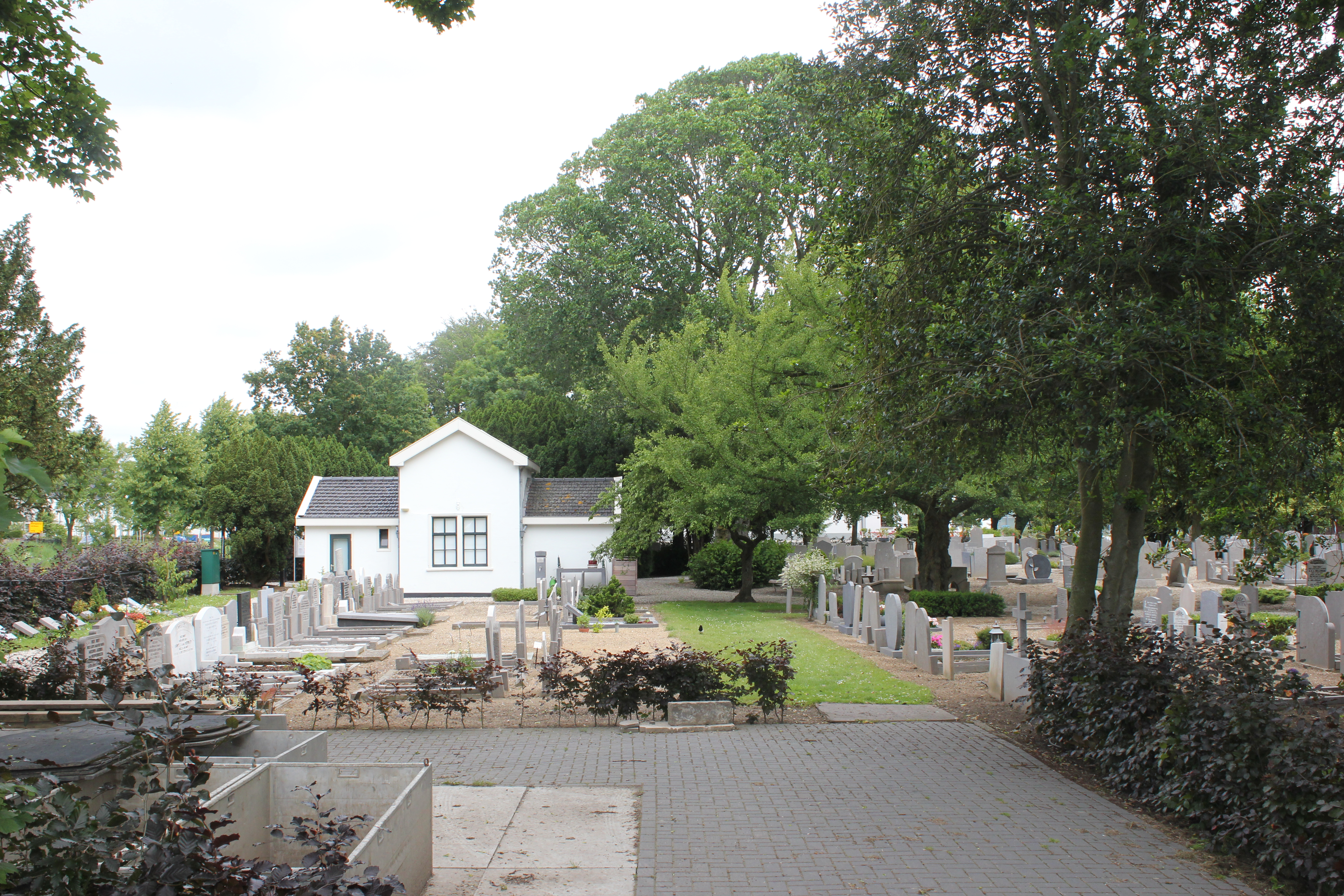
Exeter elm (background), De Iepenhof cemetery, Hoofddorp (2016)

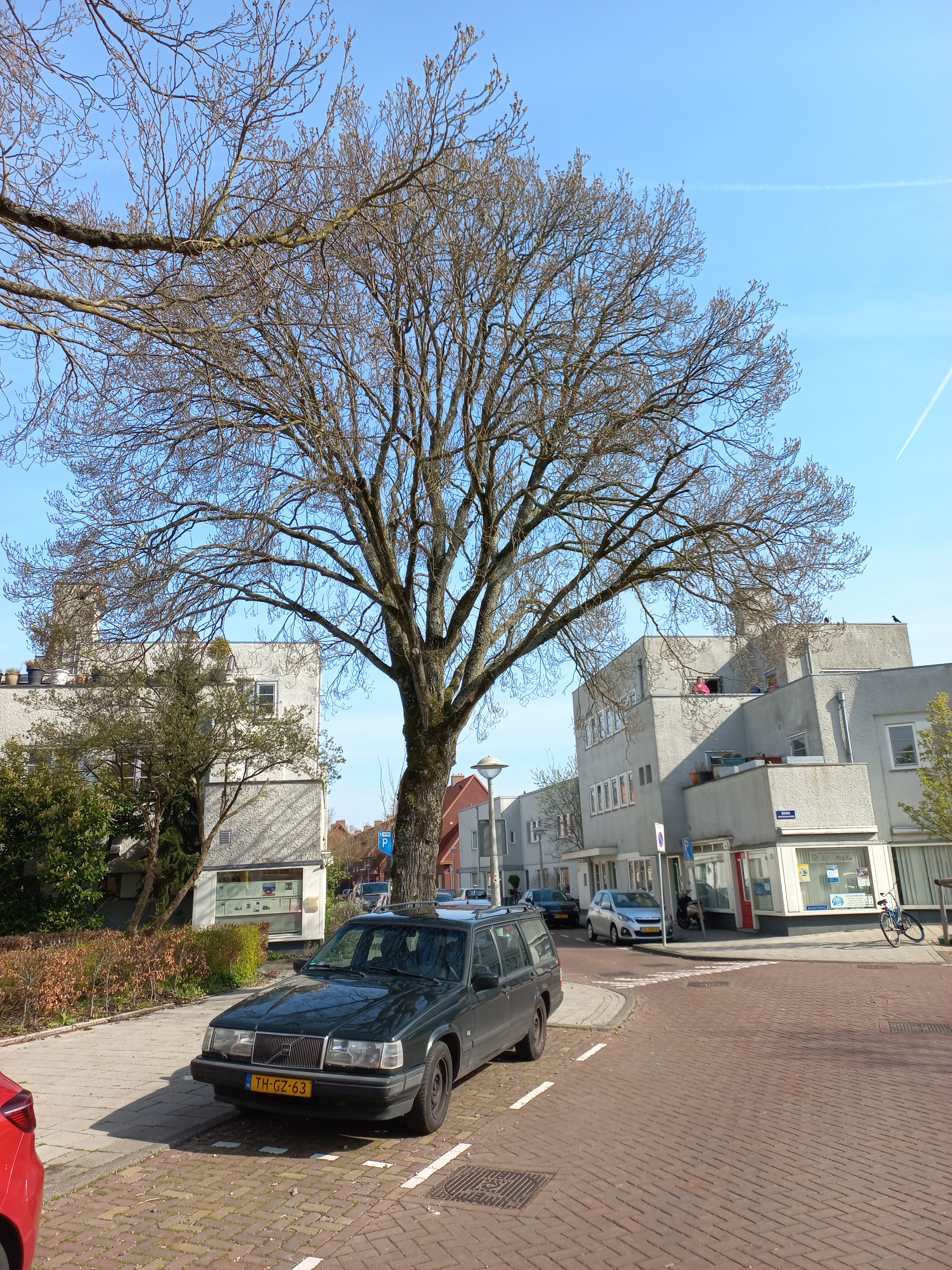
'Exoniensis' in April, the Brink, Betondorp, the Netherlands (2022)

In Sweden 'Exoniensis' is sometimes pruned from an early age to form a tidy cone-shaped tree called locally 'pyramidalm' (: pyramid elm - also one of Späth's names for 'Exoniensis').

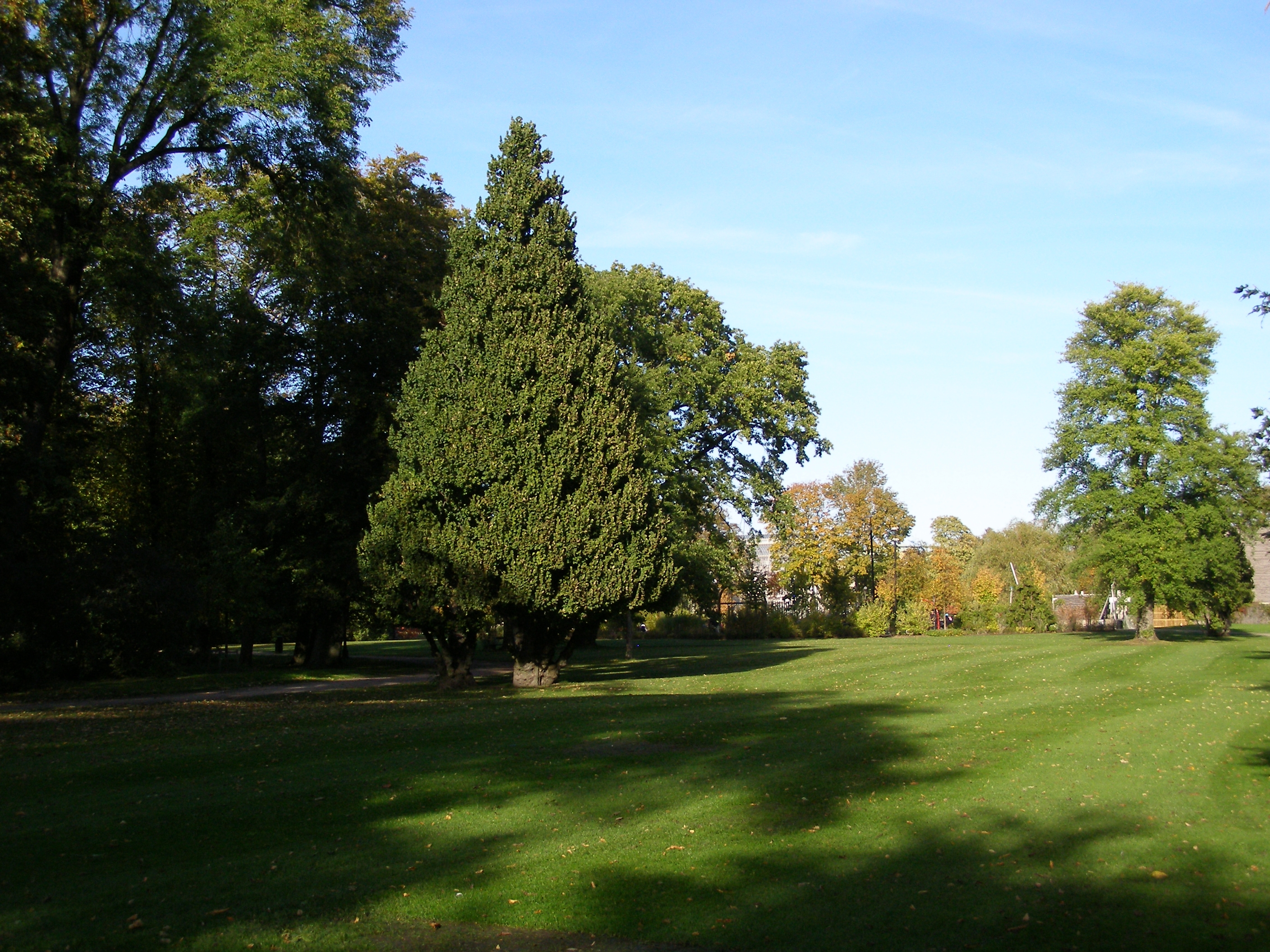
'Pyramidalm' [:pyramid elm] (pruned 'Exoniensis'), Garden Society of Gothenburg, Sweden (2014)

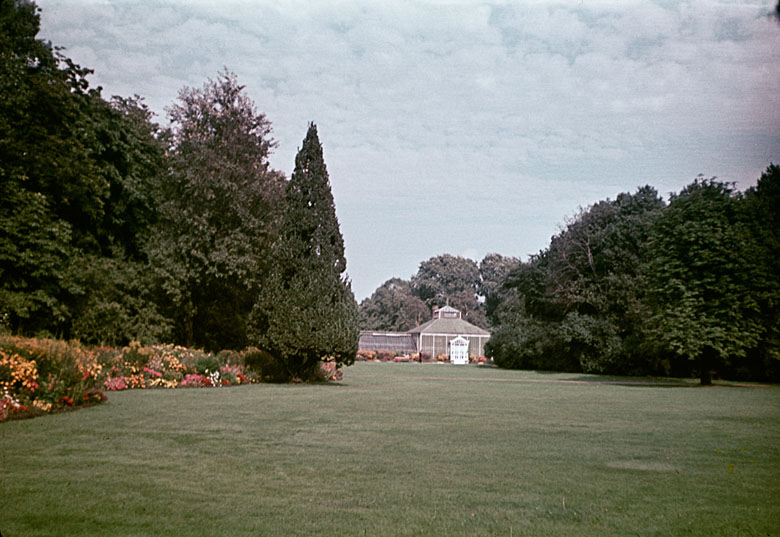
Same (1944)

== Notable trees ==
Bean (1936) noted a large old specimen, 12 feet in girth, in the garden of the Old Vicarage, Bitton, Gloucestershire. The oldest in Sweden, at Gustav III's Pavilion in Hagaparken, had a height in 2008 of 19 m and a bole girth of 462 cm. A 180-year-old specimen in Hamburg has attained a height of 28 m and a trunk diameter of 1.45 m. The UK TROBI Champion tree is in Scotland, at Baxter Park, Dundee, measuring 15 m high by 103 cm d.b.h. in 2004. The cultivar is represented in Éire by a tree at Birr Castle (Mount Palmer), County Offaly, with a d.b.h. of 29 cm when measured in 2002.

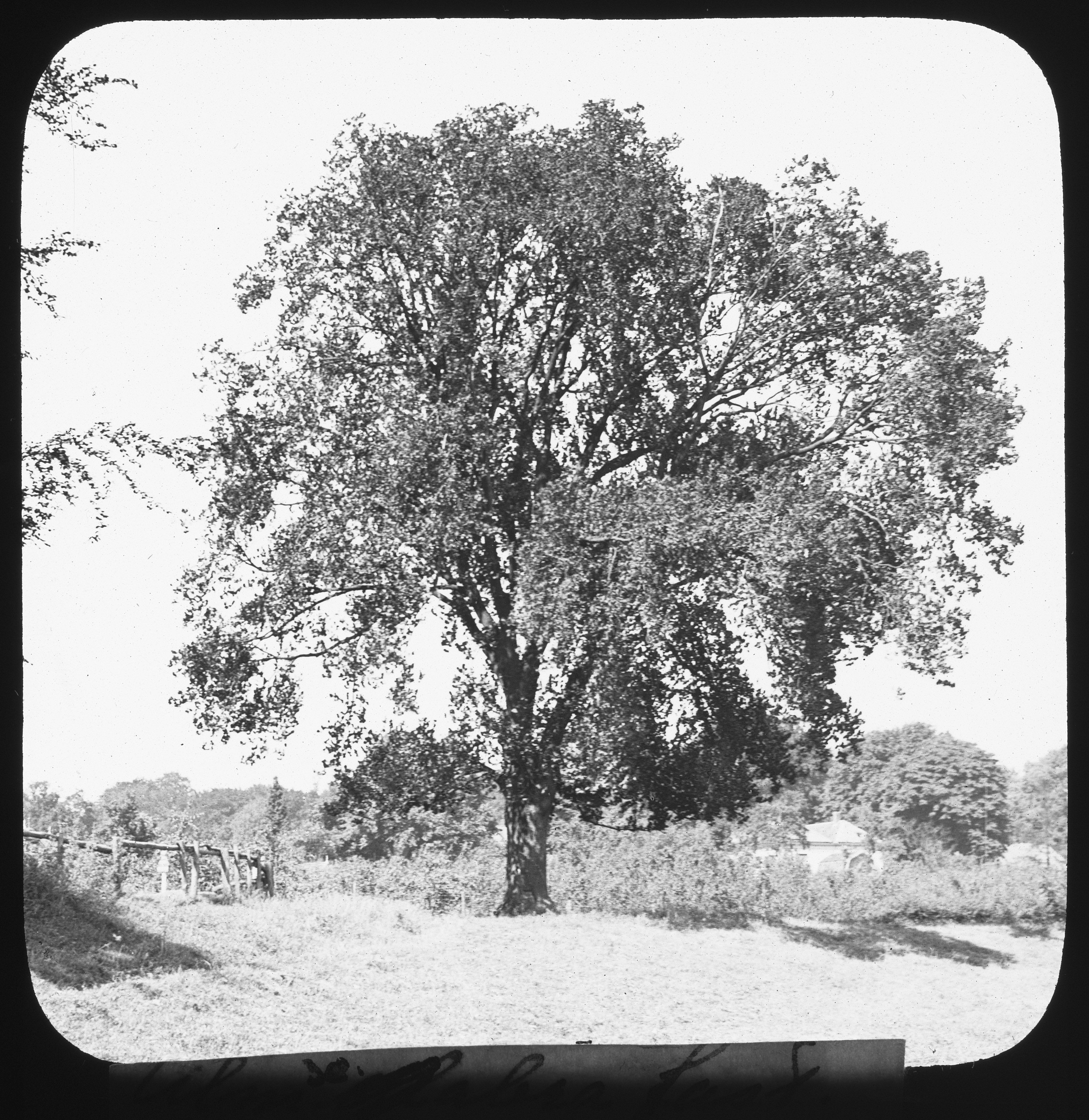
Early slide of an Exeter Elm in the Netherlands

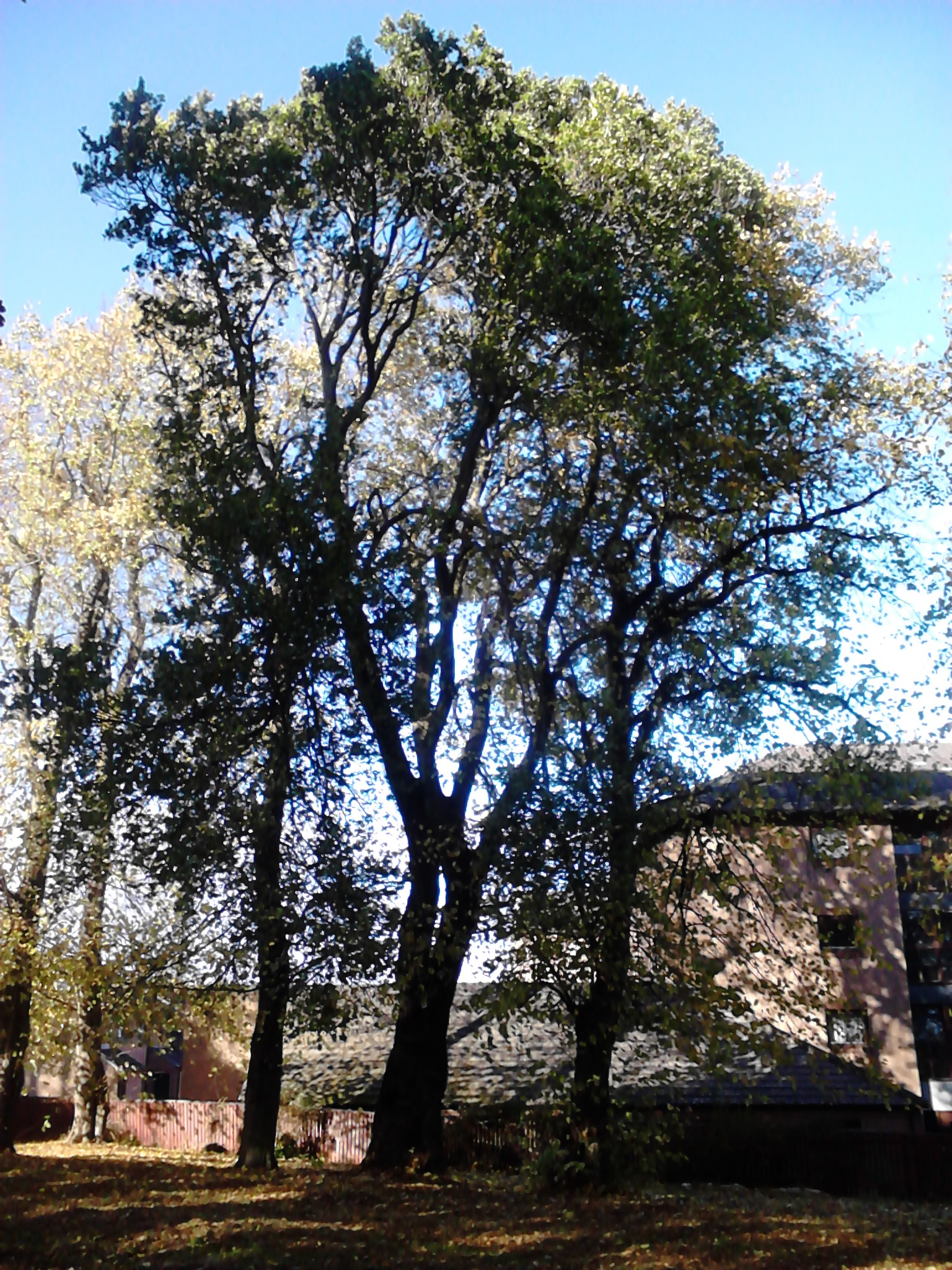
Old unpollarded Exeter Elm, Lochend Park, Edinburgh, showing pendulous branch

== Varieties ==
The Baudriller nursery of Angers, France, marketed a variegated Exeter elm in the 1880s, U. montana 'Fastigiata Variegata'.

== Hybrid cultivars ==
'Clusius', 'Columella', 'Dodoens', 'Lobel', 'Plantyn', 'Nanguen' = Lutèce, 'Wanoux' = Vada. The cultivar 'Columella' features the same rough, rounded, contorted leaves, the result of a recessive gene inherited from the Exeter Elm.

'Exoniensis' also indirectly featured in the Italian elm breeding programme as an ancestor of 'Plantyn', which was crossed with clones of the Siberian Elm Ulmus pumila to produce the cultivars 'Arno', 'Plinio', and 'San Zanobi'.

Despite being of British provenance and, at the time of writing, the only wych cultivar with any resistance to Dutch elm disease, and despite contributing to the complex hybrids above, Exeter elm did not appear in Seddon and Shreeve's Great British Elms (Kew, 2024).

== Synonymy ==
- Ulmus campestris var. nuda subvar. fastigiata oxfortii Hort. Vilv., probable misspelling.
- Ulmus fordii Hort.: Loudon, Arboretum et Fruticetum Britannicum, 3: 1399, 1838.
- Ulmus montana fastigiata: Loudon, Arboretum et Fruticetum Britannicum, 3: 1399, 1838.
- Ulmus montana f. fastigiata plumosa Hort.: Schelle in Beissner et al. Handbuch der Laubholz-Benennung 85. 1903.
- Ulmus ontariensis Hort. ex. Steud.
- Ulmus plumosa: C. de Vos ,
- Ulmus plumosa foliis variegatis: C. de Vos, Woordenboek 137, 1867.
- Ulmus suberosa oxoniensis: Audibert, Tonelle, Tarascon, France Catalogue, 1832, probable misspelling.
- Ulmus ? var. replicata: Masters, Hortus Duroverni, 67, 1831, name in synonymy.

== Accessions ==
Europe

- Arboretum Trompenburg , Netherlands. No details available.
- Brighton & Hove City Council, UK. NCCPG Elm Collection. A number of trees, large specimens at Stanmer Park Arboretum (1), Linkway Lodge, Hollingdean (40+), University of Sussex (3) and Whitehawk Way (2).
- Cambridge Botanic Garden , University of Cambridge, UK. 1 tree, no accession details available.
- Dubrava Arboretum, Lithuania. No details available.
- Grange Farm Arboretum , Sutton St. James, Spalding, Lincs., UK. Acc. no. 829.
- Hortus Botanicus Nationalis, Salaspils, Latvia. Acc. nos. 18105,6,7.
- Linnaean Gardens of Uppsala, Sweden. Acc. no. 0000–1006.
- Museum Castle Sypesteyn, Nieuw-Loosdrechtsedijk 150, Loosdrecht, (Wijdemeren, Netherlands) 3 mature trees planted in 1910.
- Royal Botanic Garden Edinburgh, UK. Acc. no. 19699363.
- Sir Harold Hillier Gardens, Romsey, UK. Acc. nos. 1977.6756, 1977.7086.
- Tallinn Botanic Garden, Estonia . No accession details available.
- University of Copenhagen, Botanic Garden, Denmark. No details available.

Australasia

- Ballarat Botanical Gardens, Australia. 1 tree, planted c.1900. Acc. no. T11321.
