= Ulmus glabra 'Fastigiata Variegata' =

Elm cultivar

- Species: Ulmus glabra
- Cultivar: 'Fastigiata Variegata'
- Origin: France

The Wych Elm cultivar Ulmus glabra 'Fastigiata Variegata' was listed in the 1880 catalogue of the Baudriller nursery, Angers, France, as U. montana fastigiata variegata.

== Description ==
The tree was described as a variegated, pyramidal Exeter Elm.

== Cultivation ==
No specimens are known to survive.
