= Betondorp =

- Neighbourhood of Amsterdam
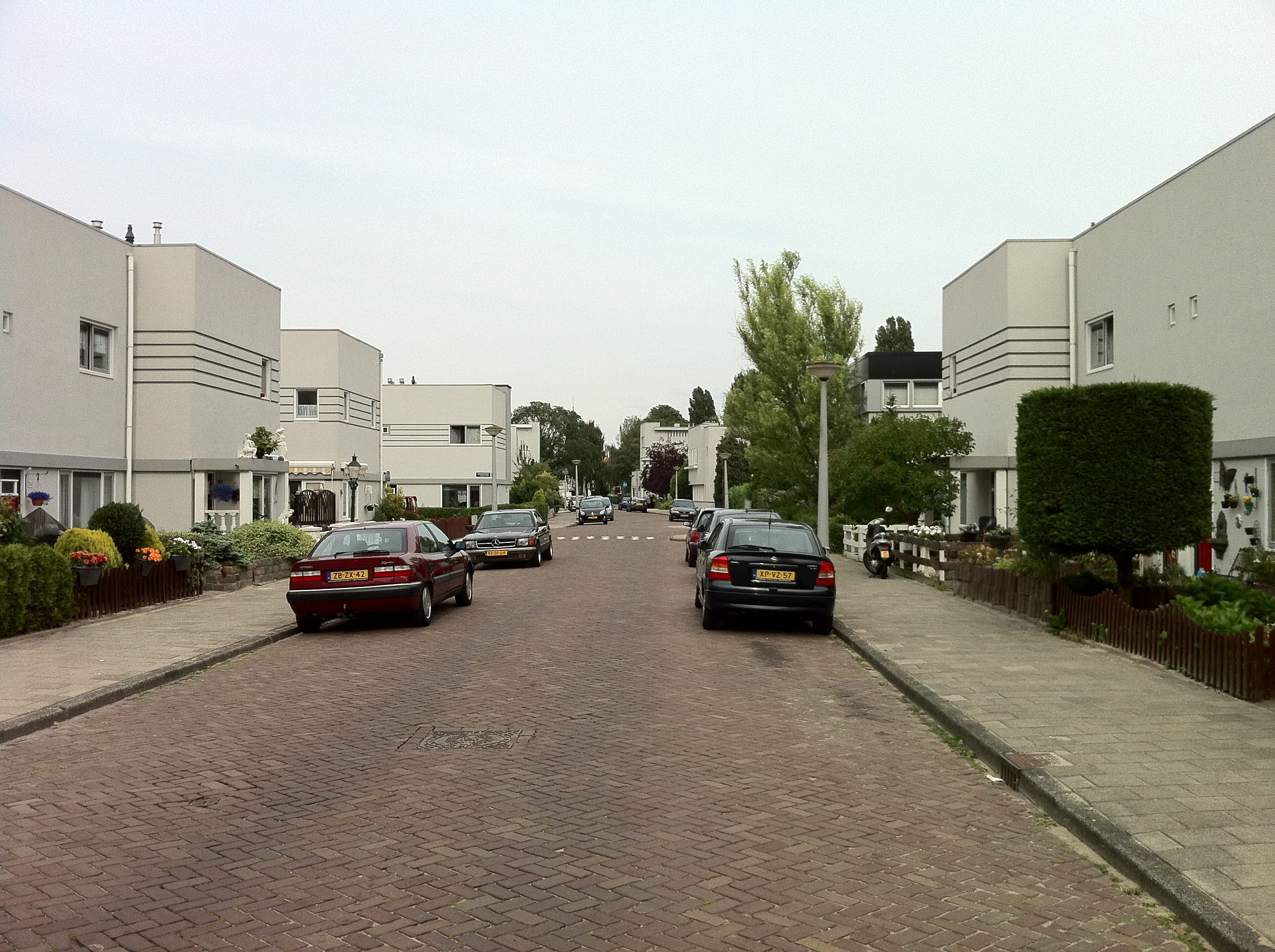
- Veeteeltstraat in Betondorp

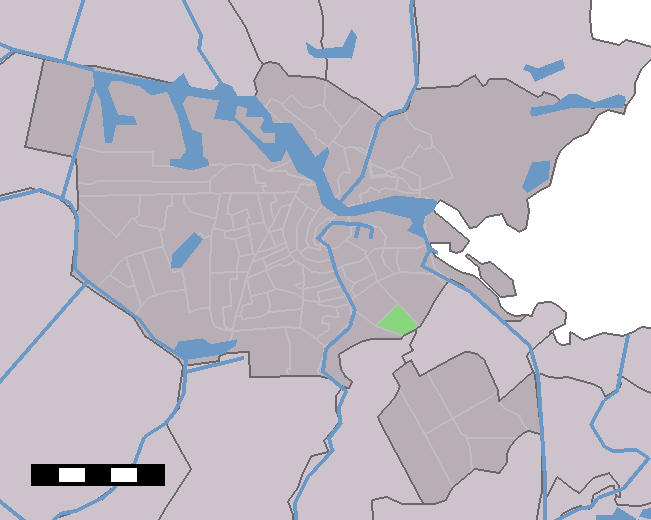
- Betondorp (green) within the municipality of Amsterdam (dark grey)
- Coordinates: 52°20′25″N 4°56′35″E
- Country: Netherlands
- Province: North Holland
- Municipality: Amsterdam
- Borough: Amsterdam-Oost
- Time zone: UTC+1 (CET)

Betondorp (Dutch pronunciation: [bəˈtɔndɔr(ə)p]; Concrete Village) is a neighbourhood of Amsterdam, Netherlands. It was built in the 1920s as an experiment in building affordable housing with new, cheap building materials, chiefly concrete.

The houses are built in a sober, minimalist form of Art Deco.

Betondorp is located in the Watergraafsmeer neighbourhood.

Footballer Johan Cruyff was born and raised in Betondorp. In his teens he joined Ajax, his hometown club that had their stadium and training ground right across from where he grew up. Another famous Betondorp native was Gerard van het Reve, and he lived with his older brother Karel van het Reve and their parents in the Ploegstraat (the family lived in three different houses in de Ploegstraat) in Betondorp between 1924 and 1938.
