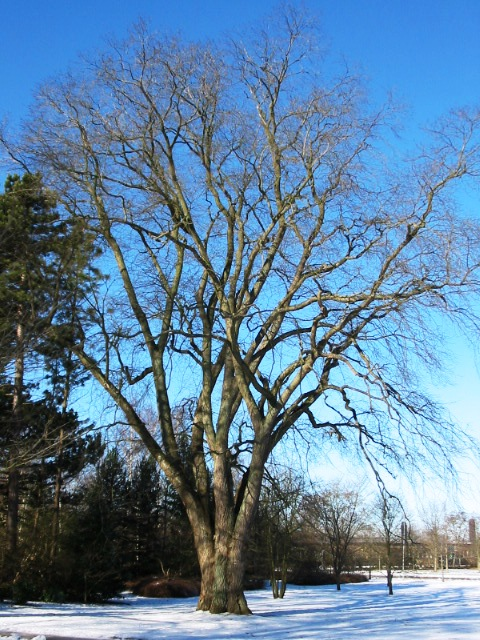
- Wych elm

Conservation status
- Data Deficient (IUCN 3.1)

Scientific classification
- Kingdom: Plantae
- Clade: Tracheophytes
- Clade: Angiosperms
- Clade: Eudicots
- Clade: Rosids
- Order: Rosales
- Family: Ulmaceae
- Genus: Ulmus
- Subgenus: U. subg. Ulmus
- Section: U. sect. Ulmus
- Species: U. glabra

Binomial name
- Ulmus glabra Huds.
- Distribution map

Synonyms
- List: Ulmus adiantifolia Dippel; Ulmus camperdowni (Bean) J.V.Armstr. & P.D.Sell; Ulmus campestris cornuta I.David; Ulmus cebennensis Audib. ex Planch.; Ulmus cinerea Planch.; Ulmus communis Carrière; Ulmus corylacea Dumort.; Ulmus crispa Willd.; Ulmus excelsa Borkh.; Ulmus exoniensis (K.Koch) K.Koch; Ulmus expansa Rota; Ulmus forficata C.Presl; Ulmus gallica A.Chev.; Ulmus gigantea K.Koch; Ulmus glutinosa Willd.; Ulmus horizontalis Loudon; Ulmus intermedia Dippel; Ulmus latifolia Moench; Ulmus leucocarpa Schur.; Ulmus montana Stokes; Ulmus mossii A.Henry; Ulmus nigra Lodd. ex Loudon; Ulmus pyramidalis Dippel; Ulmus sukaczevii Andronov; Ulmus tomentosa Borkh.; Ulmus urticifolia Audib.

= Ulmus glabra =

Species of flowering plant in the elm family

Ulmus glabra, the wych elm or Scots elm, has the widest range of the European elm species, from Ireland eastwards to the Ural Mountains, and from the Arctic Circle south to the mountains of the Peloponnese and Sicily, where the species reaches its southern limit in Europe; it is also native to the Caucasus region and parts of Western Asia (Turkey, Syria and Iran). A large deciduous tree, it is essentially a montane species, growing at altitudes up to 1,500 m (5,000 ft), preferring sites with moist soils and high humidity. The tree can form pure forests in Scandinavia and occurs as far north as latitude 67°N at Beiarn Municipality in Norway. It has been successfully introduced as far north as Tromsø and Alta in northern Norway (70°N). It has also been successfully introduced to Narsarsuaq, near the southern tip of Greenland (61°N).

The tree was by far the most common elm in the north and west of the British Isles and is now acknowledged as the only indisputably British native elm species. Owing to its former abundance in Scotland, the tree was occasionally (primarily historically) known as Scots elm; Loch Lomond is said to be derived from the Gaelic Lac Leaman, interpreted by some as 'Lake of the Elms', 'leaman' being the genitive plural form of leam or lem, 'elm'.

Closely related species, such as Bergmann's elm, U. bergmanniana, and the Manchurian elm, U. laciniata, native to northeast Asia, were once sometimes included in U. glabra; another close relative is the Himalayan or Kashmir elm, U. wallichiana. Conversely, U. elliptica from the Caucasus, considered a species by many authorities, is sometimes listed as a regional form of U. glabra.

== Etymology ==
The word "wych" (also spelled "witch") comes from the Old English wice, meaning pliant or supple, which also gives definition to wicker and weak. Jacob George Strutt's 1822 book, Sylva Britannica, attests that the wych elm was sometimes referred to as "wych hazel", a name now applied to the unrelated genus Hamamelis, commonly called "witch hazels".

== Classification ==
=== Subspecies ===
Some botanists, notably Lindquist (1931), have proposed two subspecies:

- U. glabra subsp. glabra in the south of the species' range: broad leaves with short tapering base and acute lobes; trees often with a short, forked trunk and a low, broad crown;
- U. glabra subsp. montana (Stokes) Lindqvist in the north of the species' range (northern Britain, Scandinavia): leaves narrower, with a long tapering base and without acute lobes; trees commonly with a long single trunk and a tall, narrow crown.

Much overlap is seen between populations with these characters, and the distinction may owe to environmental influence, rather than genetic variation; the subspecies are not accepted by either Flora Europaea or Plants of the World Online.

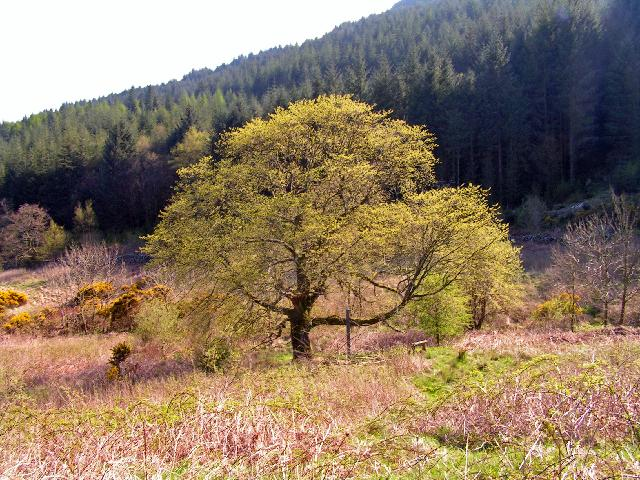
Wych elm near Castle Douglas, Galloway, late April

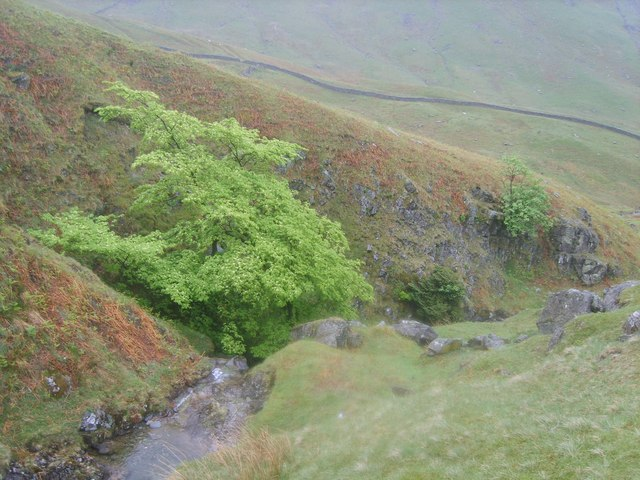
Wych elm, Scandale Beck, Cumbria, May

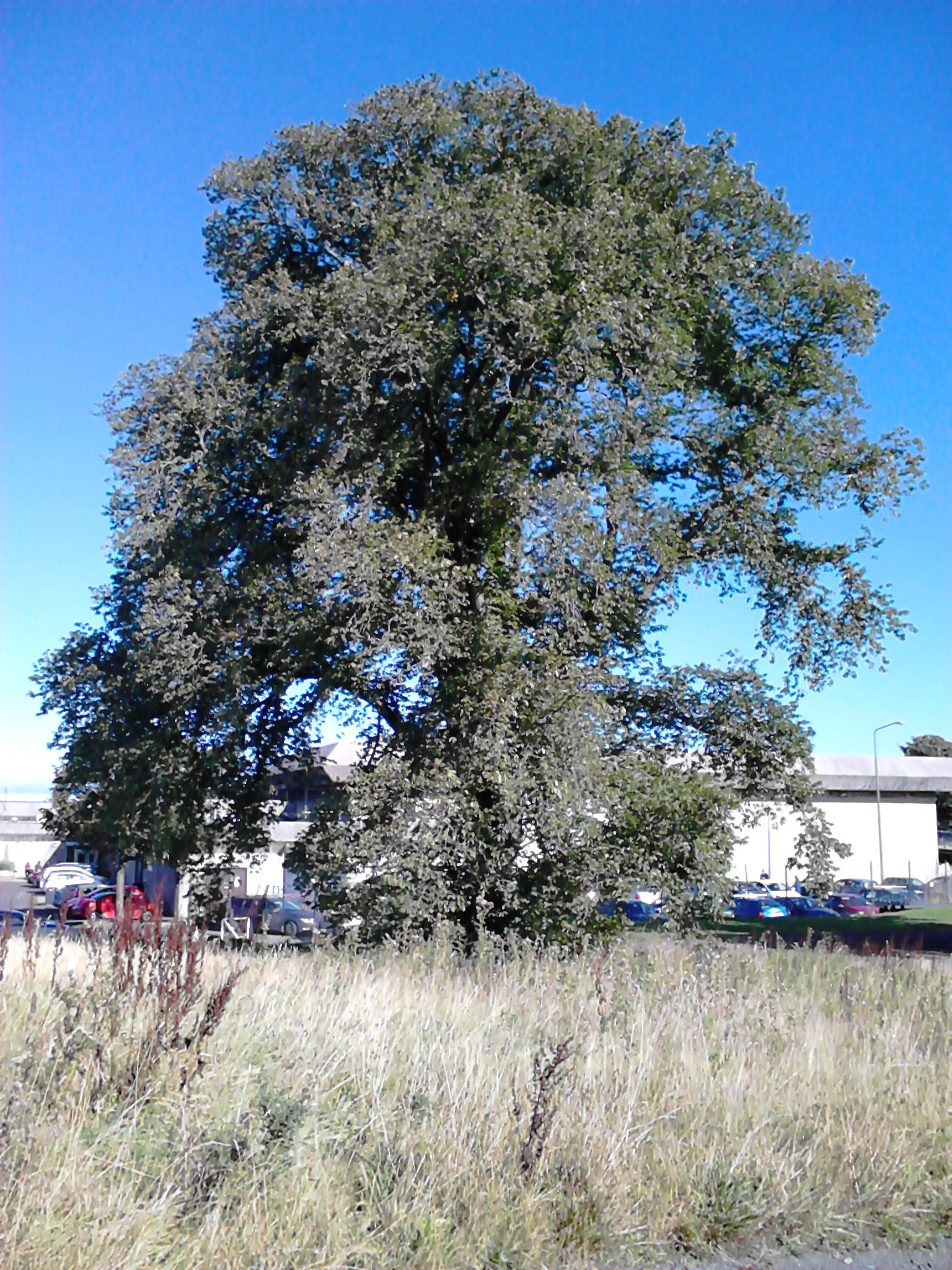
Wych elm, Edinburgh, October

== Description ==
The type sometimes reaches heights of 40 m (130 ft), typically with a broad crown where open-grown, supported by a short bole up to 2 m (6.6 ft) diameter at breast height (DBH). Normally, root suckers are not seen; natural reproduction is by seed alone. The tree is notable for its very tough, supple young shoots, which are always without the corky ridges or 'wings' characteristic of many elms. The alternate leaves are deciduous, 6–17 cm (2.4–6.7 in) long by 3–12 cm (1.2–4.7 in) broad, usually obovate with an asymmetric base, the lobe often completely covering the short (<5 mm) petiole; the upper surface is rough. Leaves on juvenile or shade-grown shoots sometimes have three or more lobes near the apex. The perfect hermaphrodite flowers appear before the leaves in early spring, produced in clusters of 10–20; they are 4 mm across on 10 mm long stems, and being wind-pollinated, are apetalous. The fruit is a winged samara 20 mm long and 15 mm broad, with a single, round, 6 mm seed in the centre, maturing in late spring. The roots can be of extraordinary length: one at Auchencraig, Larg, Ayershire, Scotland has roots which have been traced for a length of 110 metres from the trunk.

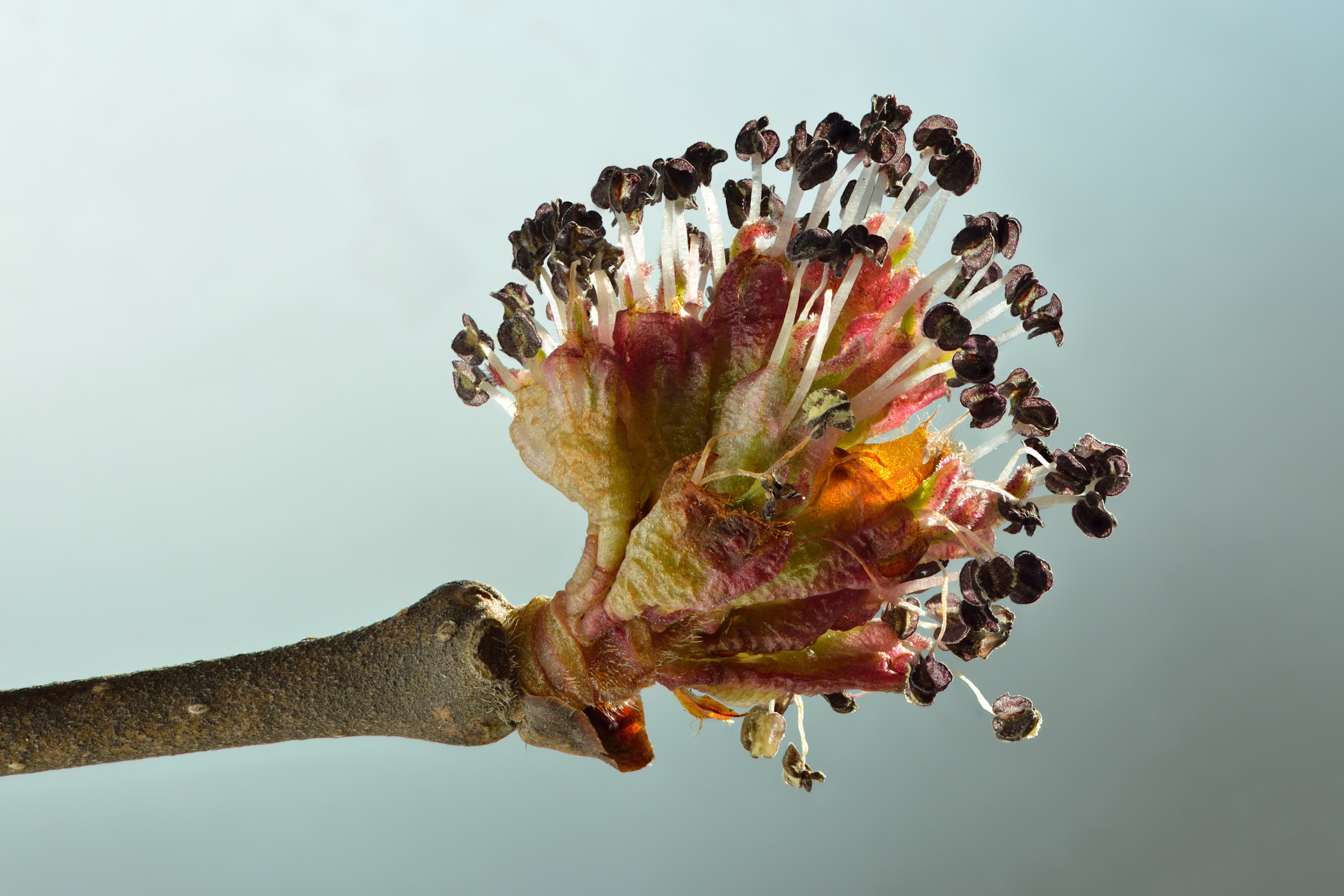
Flowers

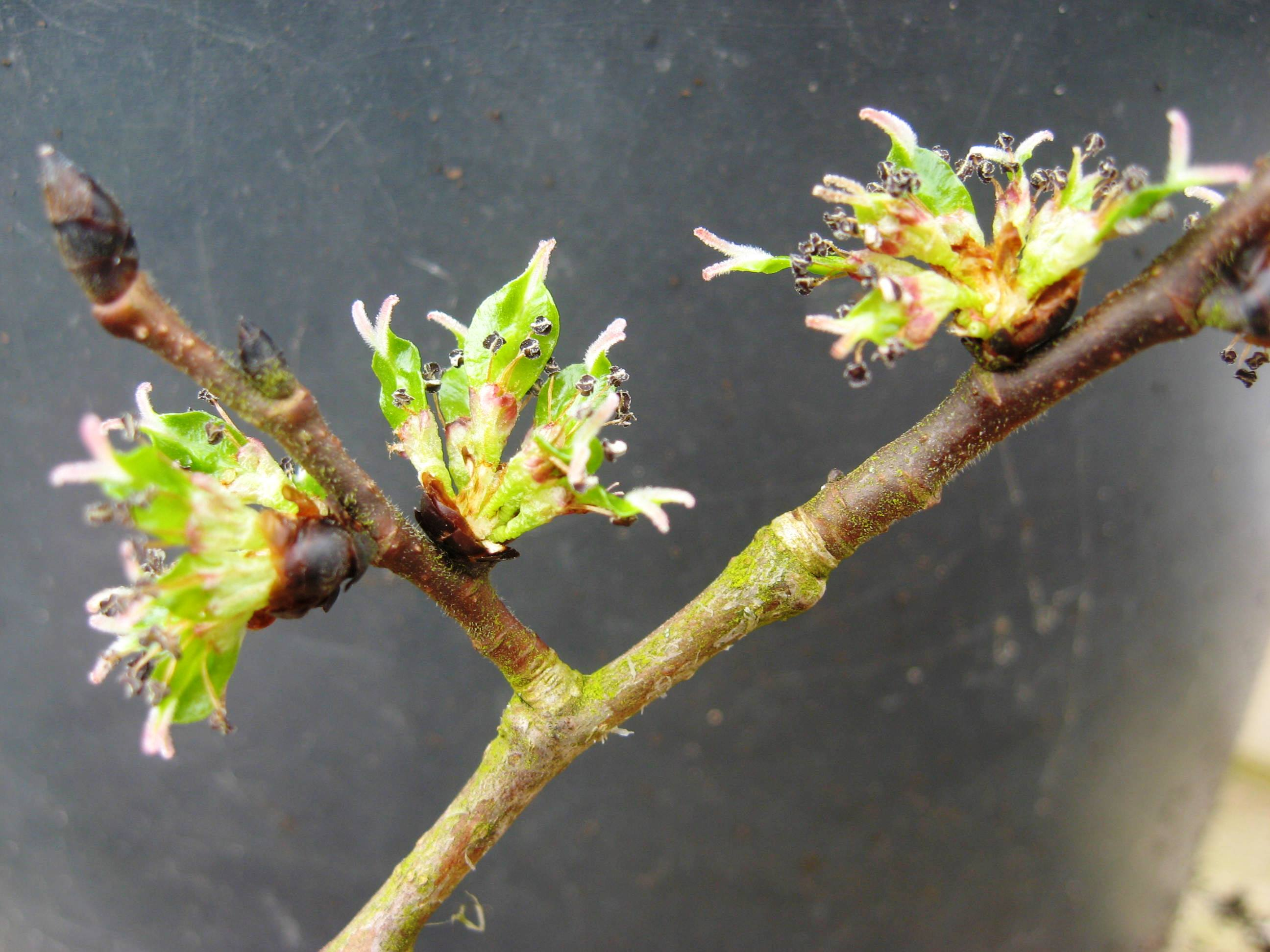
Nascent seeds

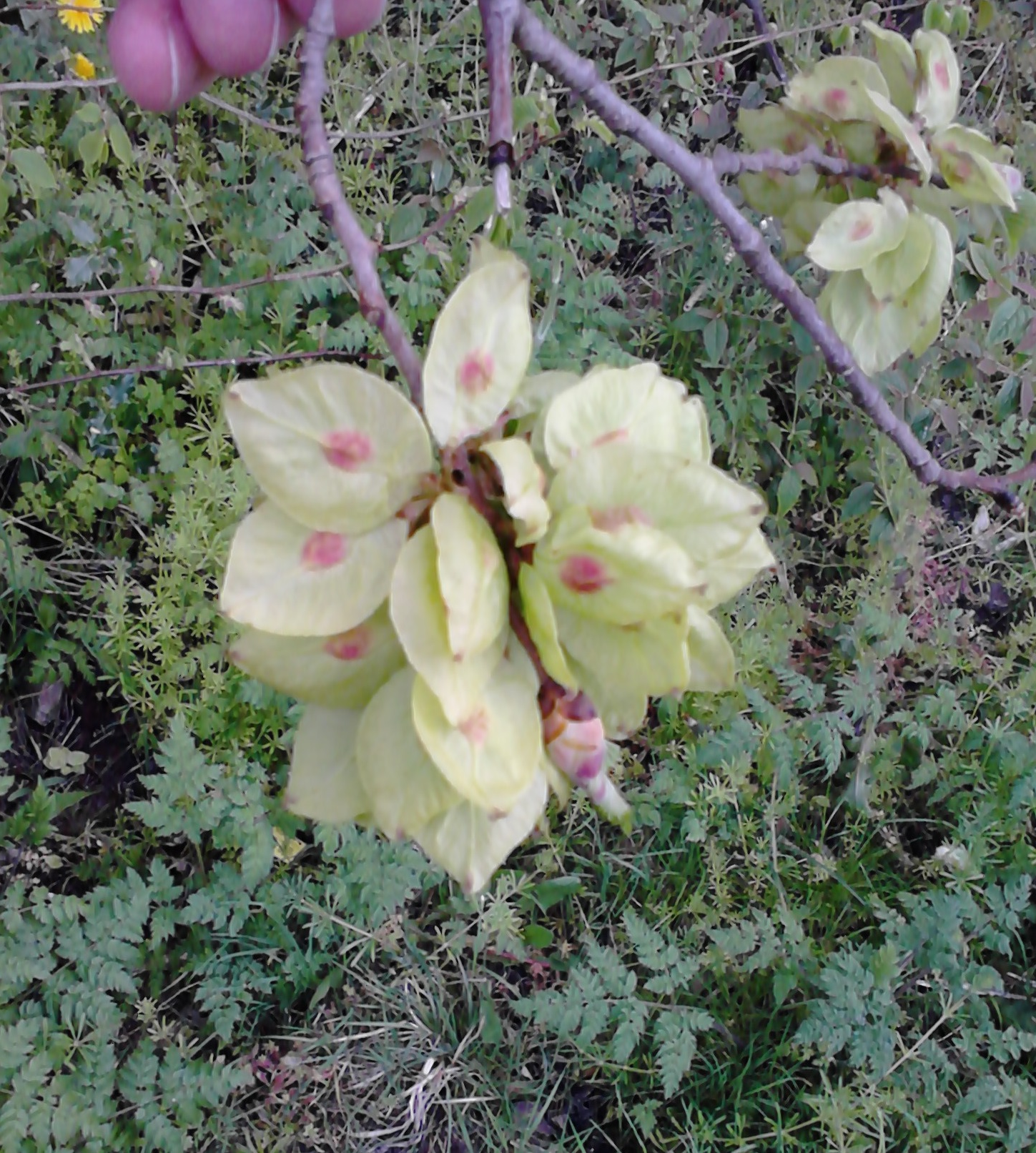
Samarae, showing seed on stalk side of centre

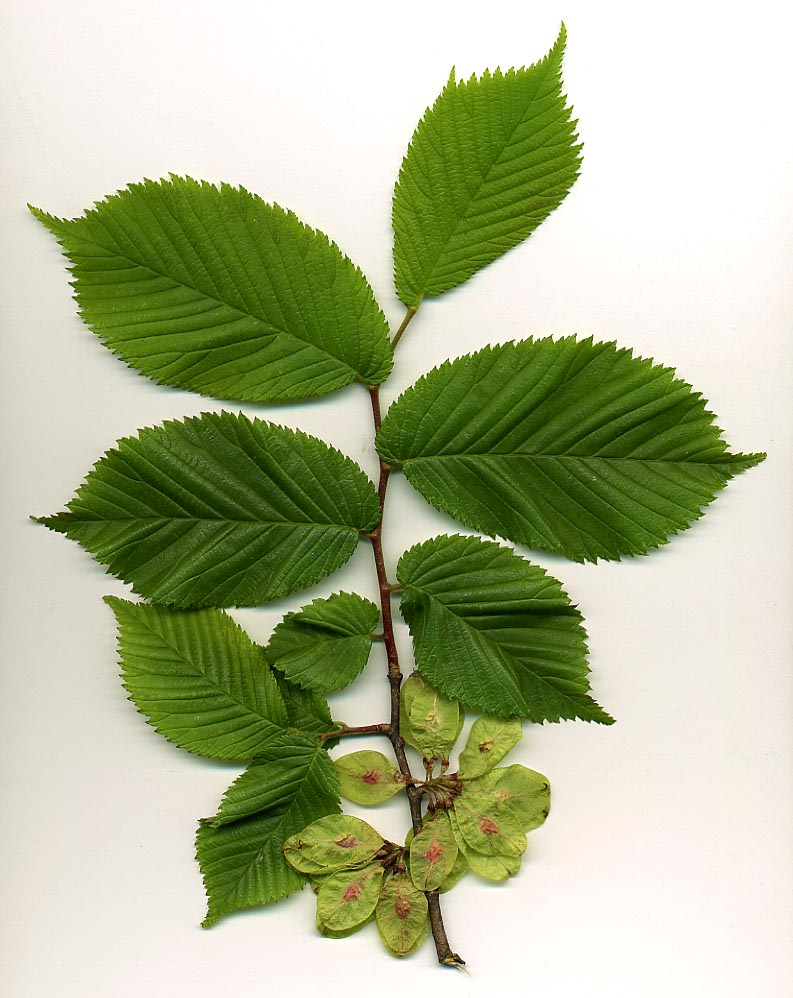
Typical unlobed leaves

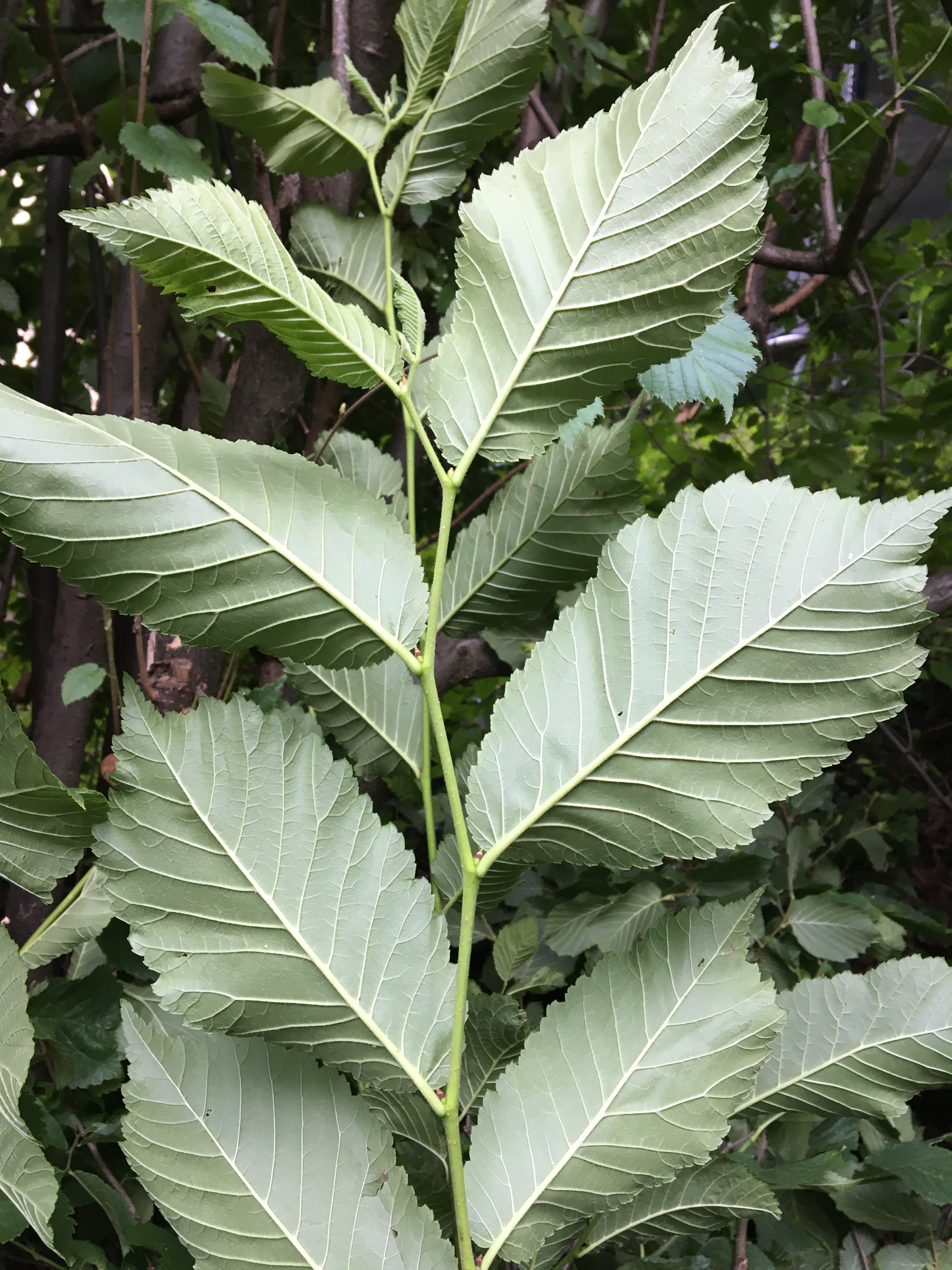
Underside of leaves, Thuringia, Germany (late June)

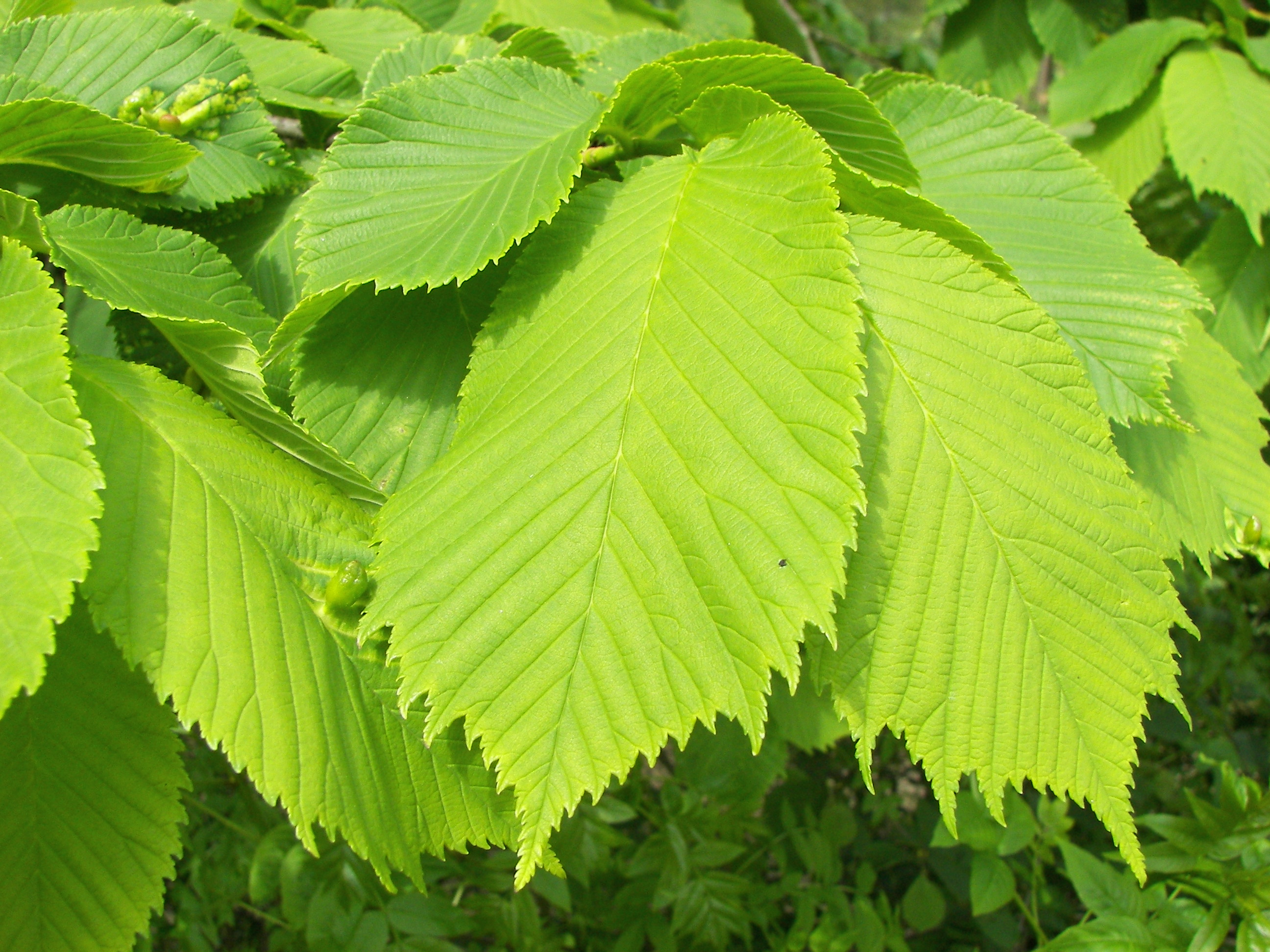
Leaves with extra lobes

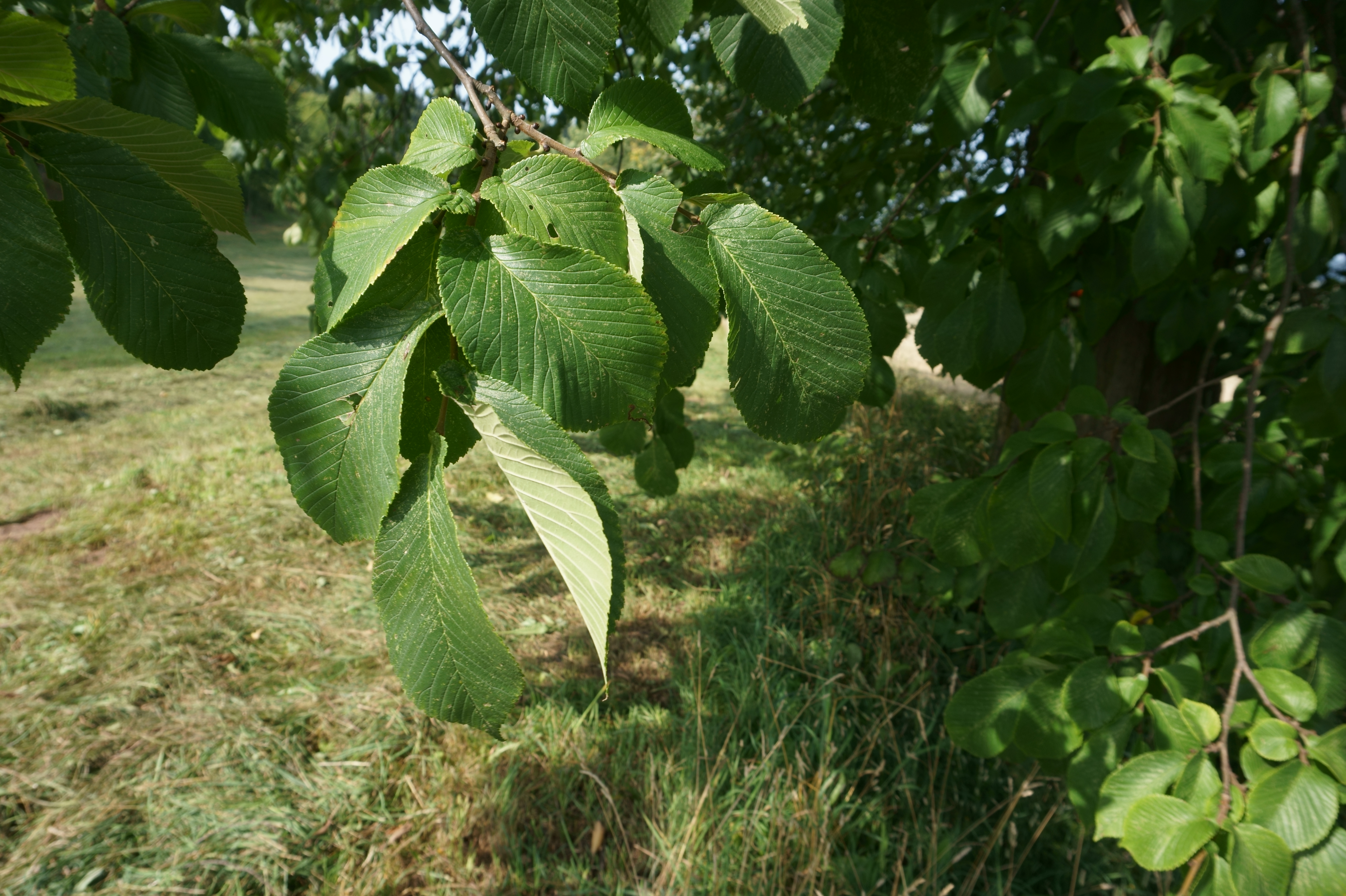
September foliage

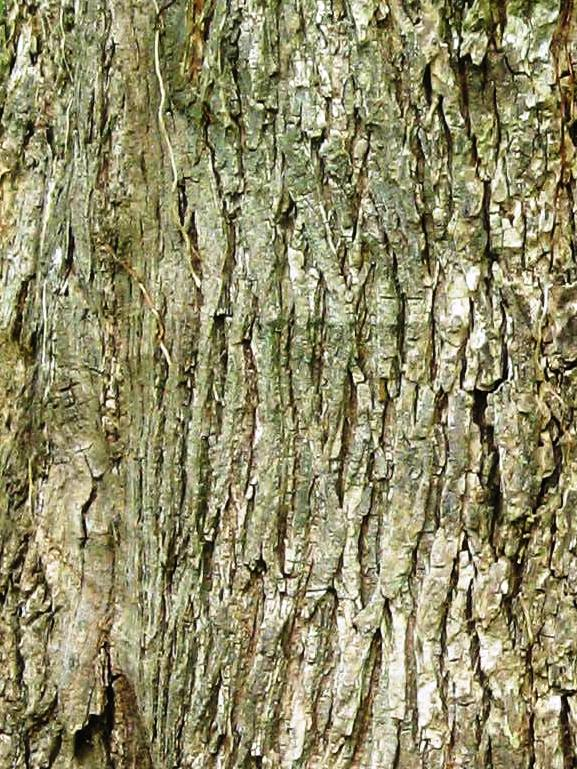
Bark, estimated age 100 years

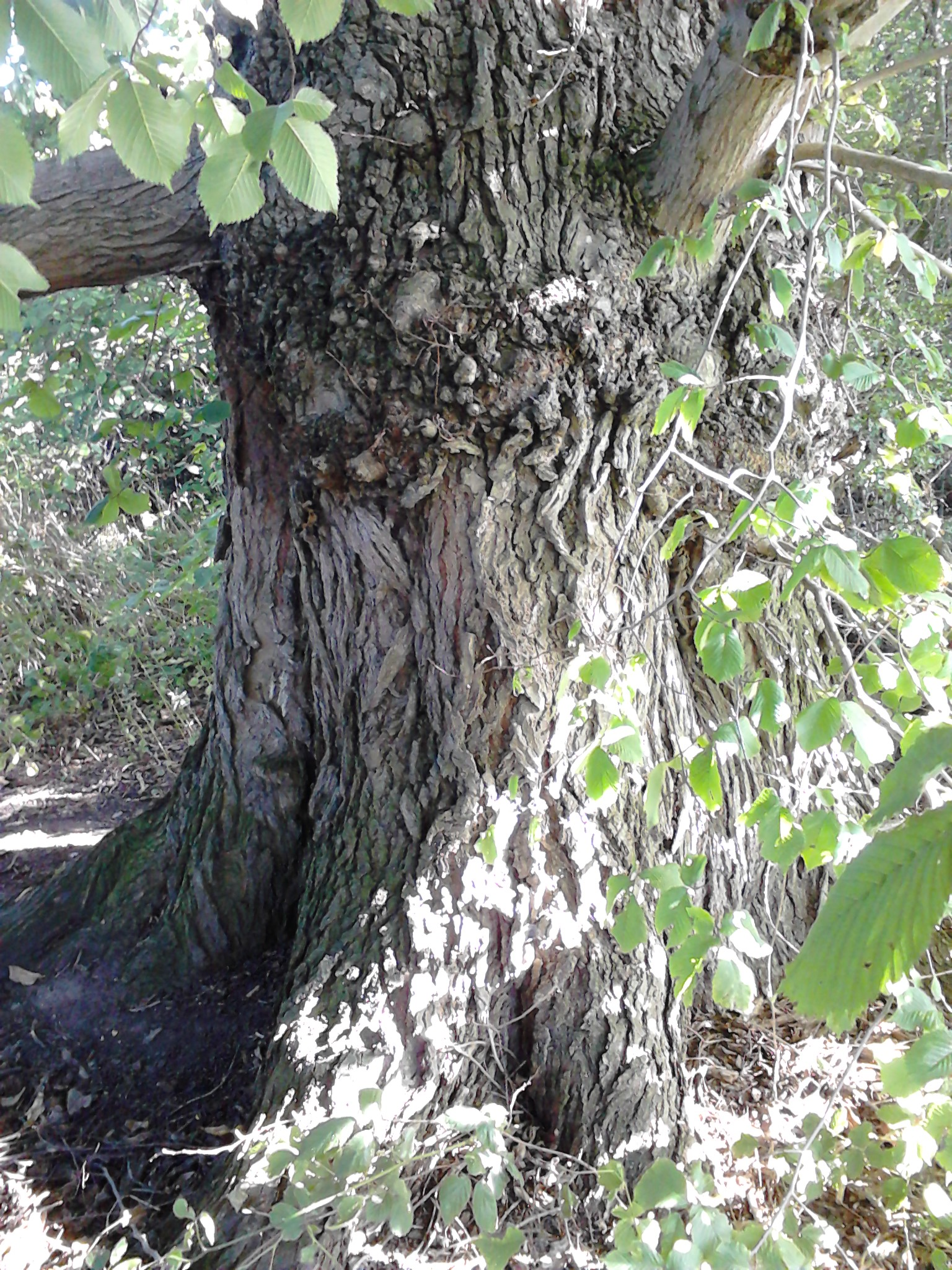
Bole of old specimen

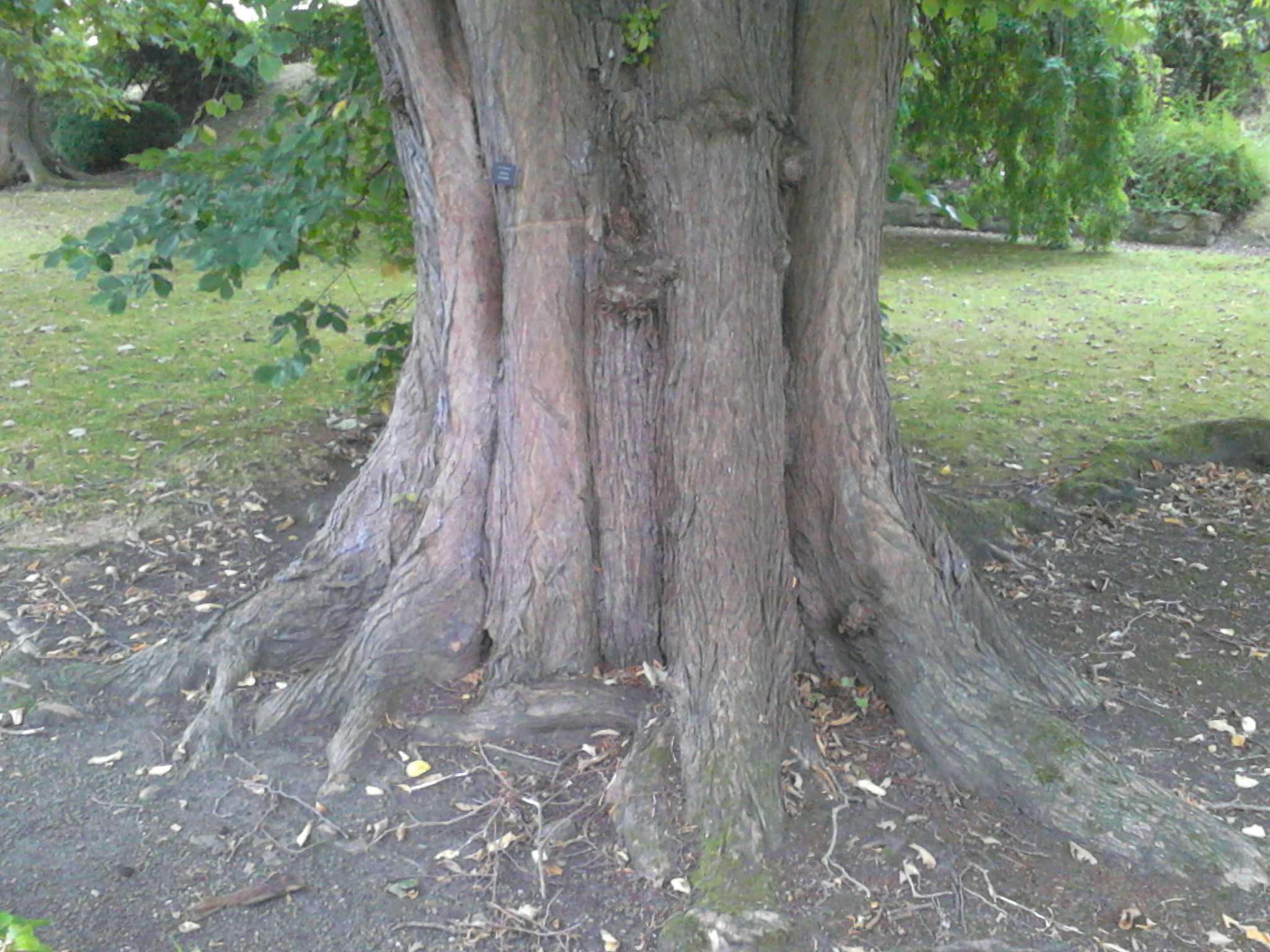
Root buttresses

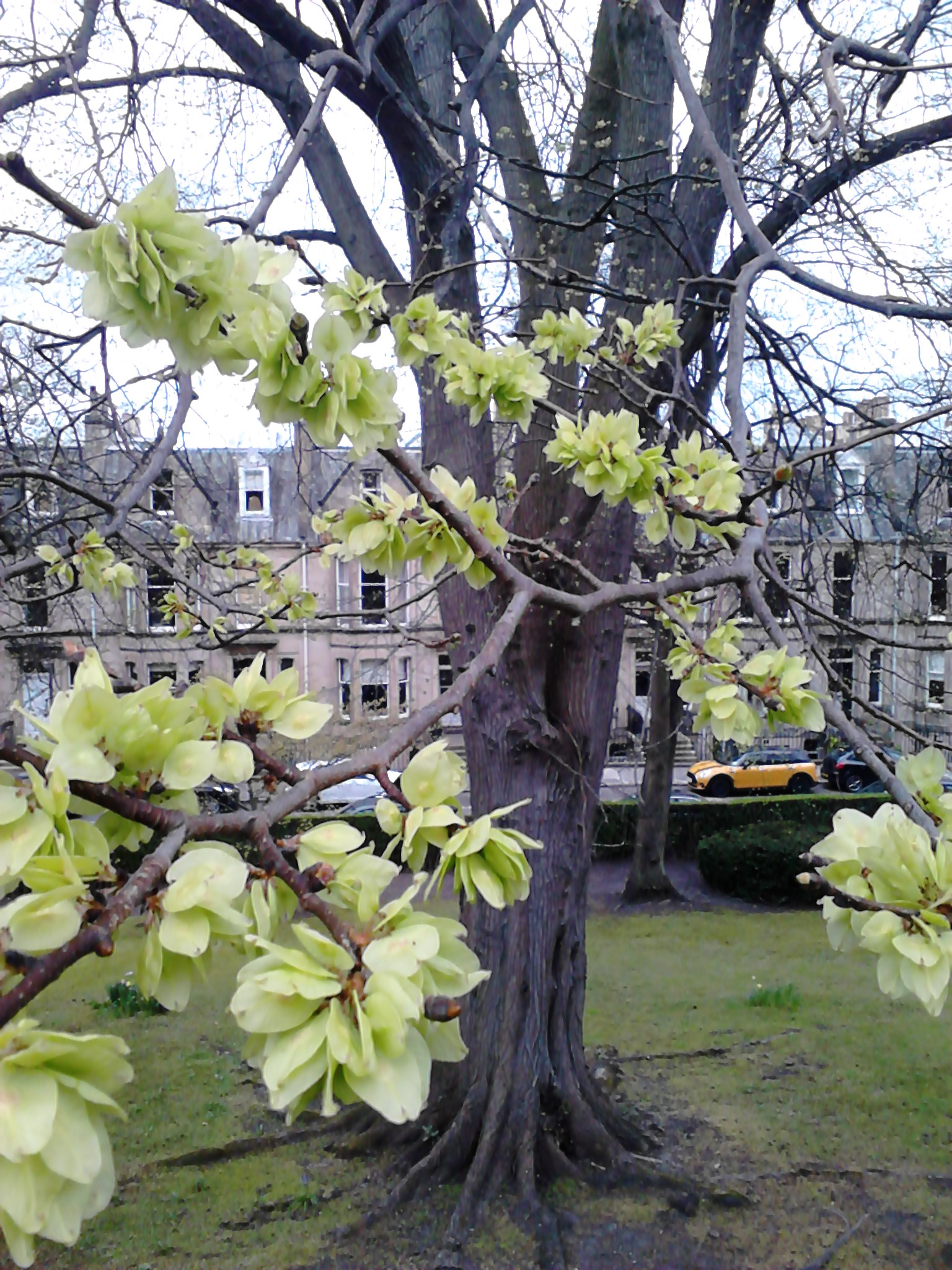
Root buttresses and fruit

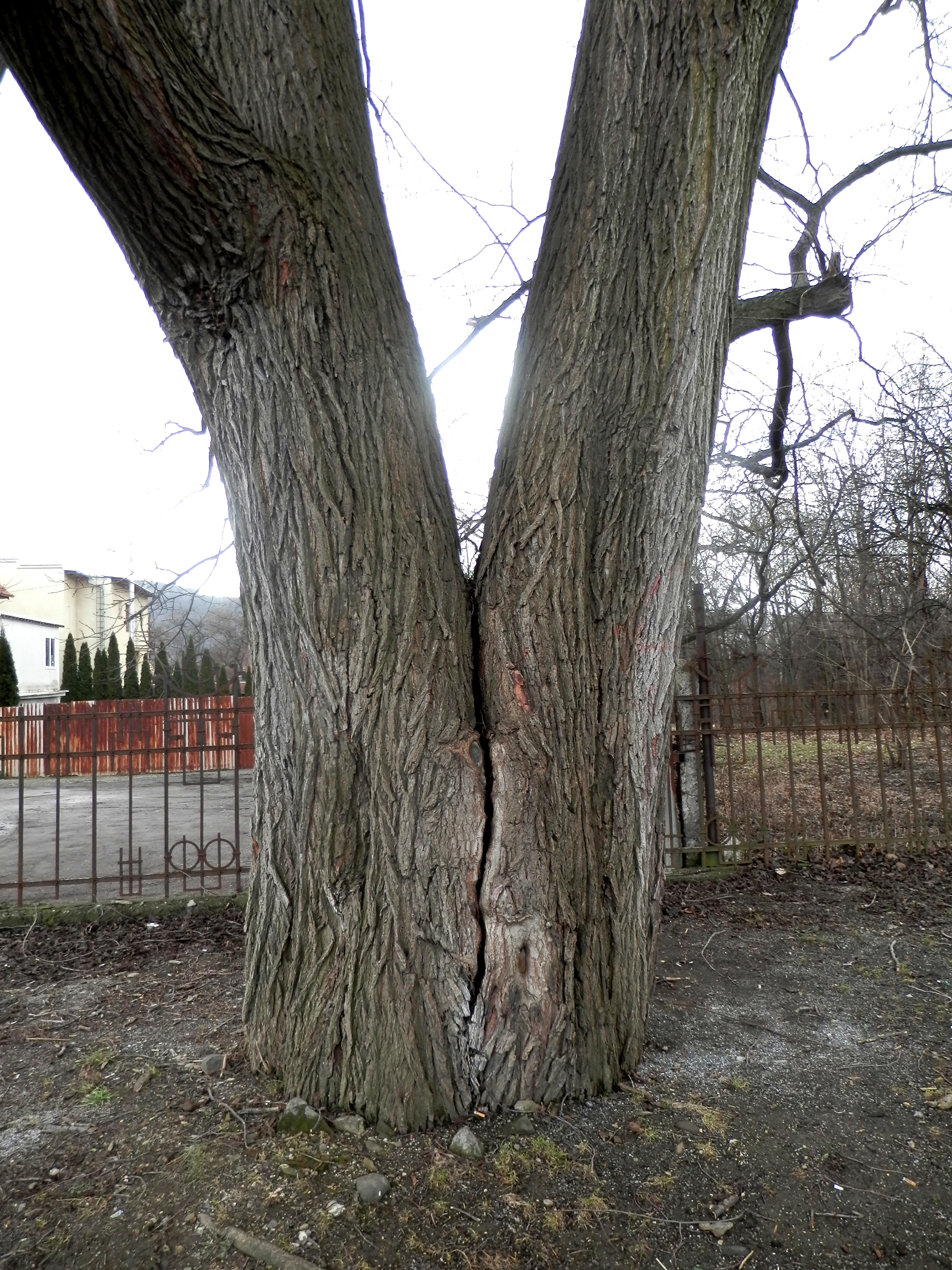
Unbuttressed bole

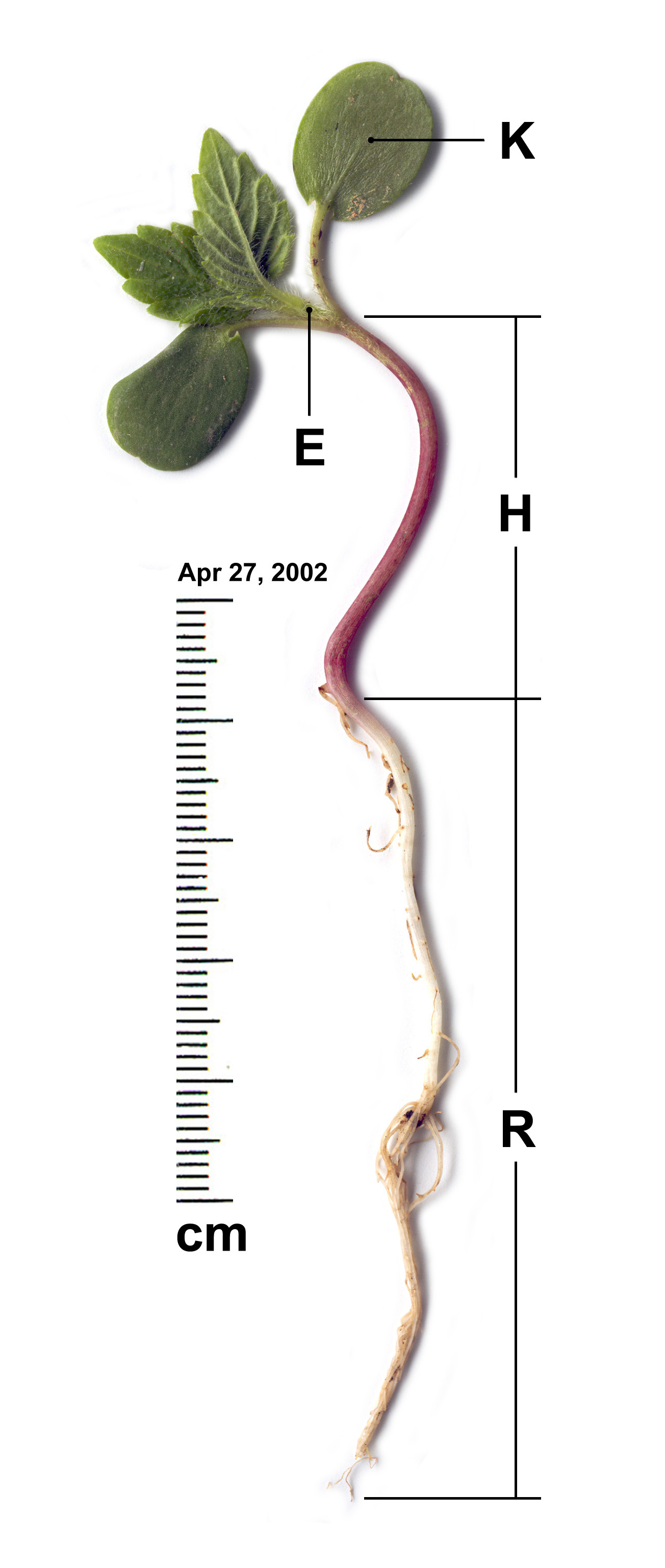
Seedling, showing cotyledons (K)

== Pests and diseases ==
While the species is highly susceptible to Dutch elm disease (DED), it is less favoured as a host by the elm bark beetles, which act as vectors. Research in Spain has indicated the presence of a triterpene, alnulin, rendering the tree bark less attractive to the beetle than the field elm, though at 87 μg/g dried bark, its concentration is not as effective as in Ulmus laevis (200 μg/g). Moreover, once the tree is dying, its bark is quickly colonized by the fungus Phoma, which radically reduces the amount of bark available for the beetle to breed on. In European trials, clones of apparently resistant trees were inoculated with the pathogen, causing 85 – 100% wilting, resulting in 68% mortality by the following year. DNA analysis by Cemagref (now Irstea) in France has determined the genetic diversity within the species is very limited, making the chances of a resistant tree evolving rather remote.

A 300-year-old example growing in Grenzhammer, Ilmenau has allegedly been scientifically proven to be resistant to Dutch elm disease. In 1998, over 700 healthy, mature trees were discovered on the upper slopes of Mount Šimonka in the Slanské Hills in Slovakia, where they are believed to have survived courtesy of their isolation from disease-carrying beetles rather than through any innate resistance; 50 clones of these trees, propagated by the Faculty of Forestry at the Technical University in Zvolen, were presented to the Prince of Wales (now King Charles III) during his state visit in 1995 and planted at his Highgrove Estate, in the Duchy of Cornwall estate, and at Clapham, Yorkshire, in 2001. They remain disease-free (2024), however, the specimen donated by the Prince in 2004 to Butterfly Conservation's trial plantation at Great Fontley, Hampshire, succumbed to DED in 2020.

The Swedish Forest Tree Breeding Association at Källstorp produced triploid and tetraploid forms of the tree, but these proved no more resistant to Dutch elm disease than the normal diploid form.

In trials conducted in Italy, the tree was found to have a slight to moderate susceptibility to elm yellows, and a high susceptibility to the elm leaf beetle Xanthogaleruca luteola.

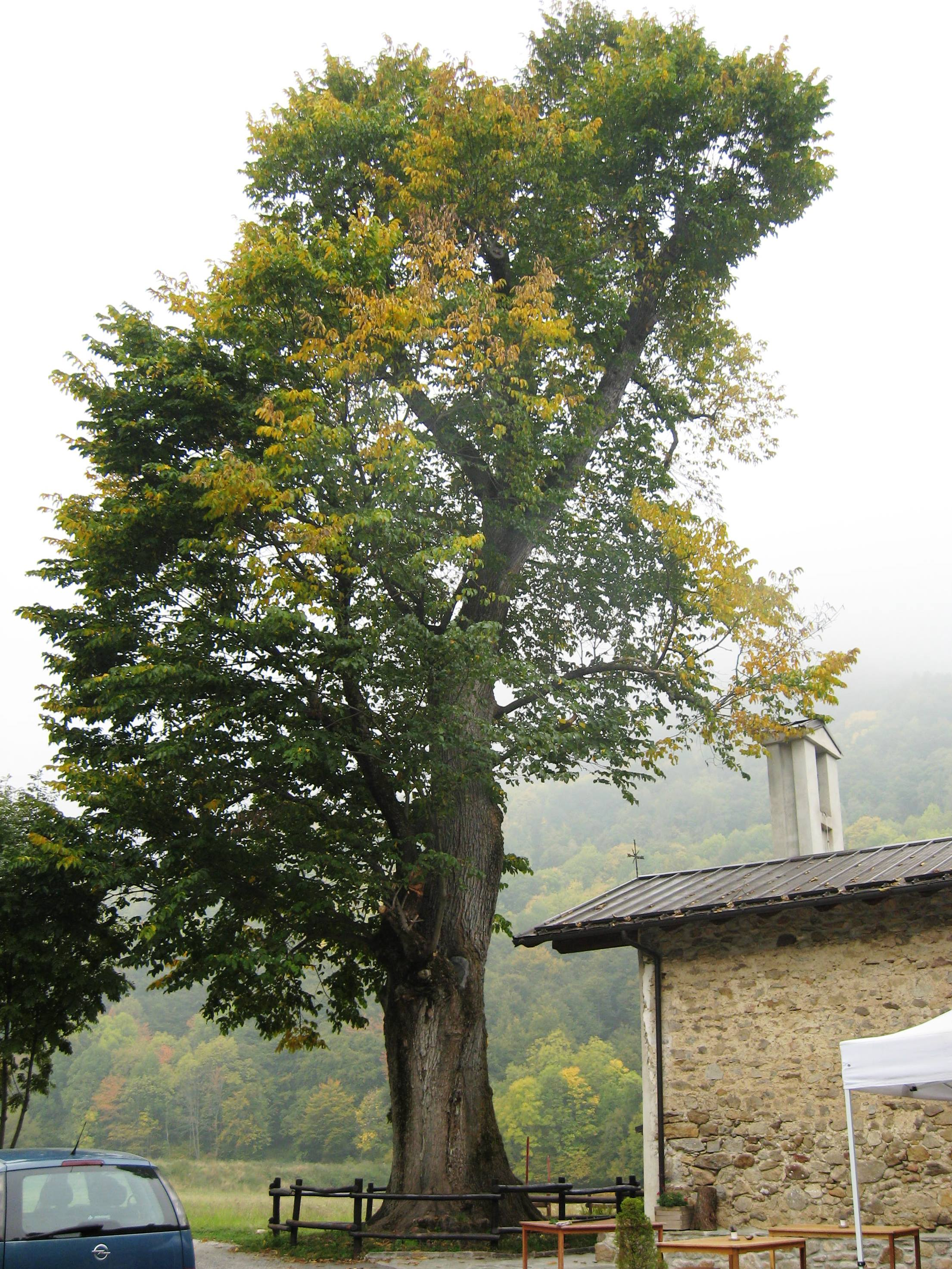
Olmo montano, U. glabra Huds., planted 1620, Bergemolo, Demonte, Italy (2017); still present in 2025

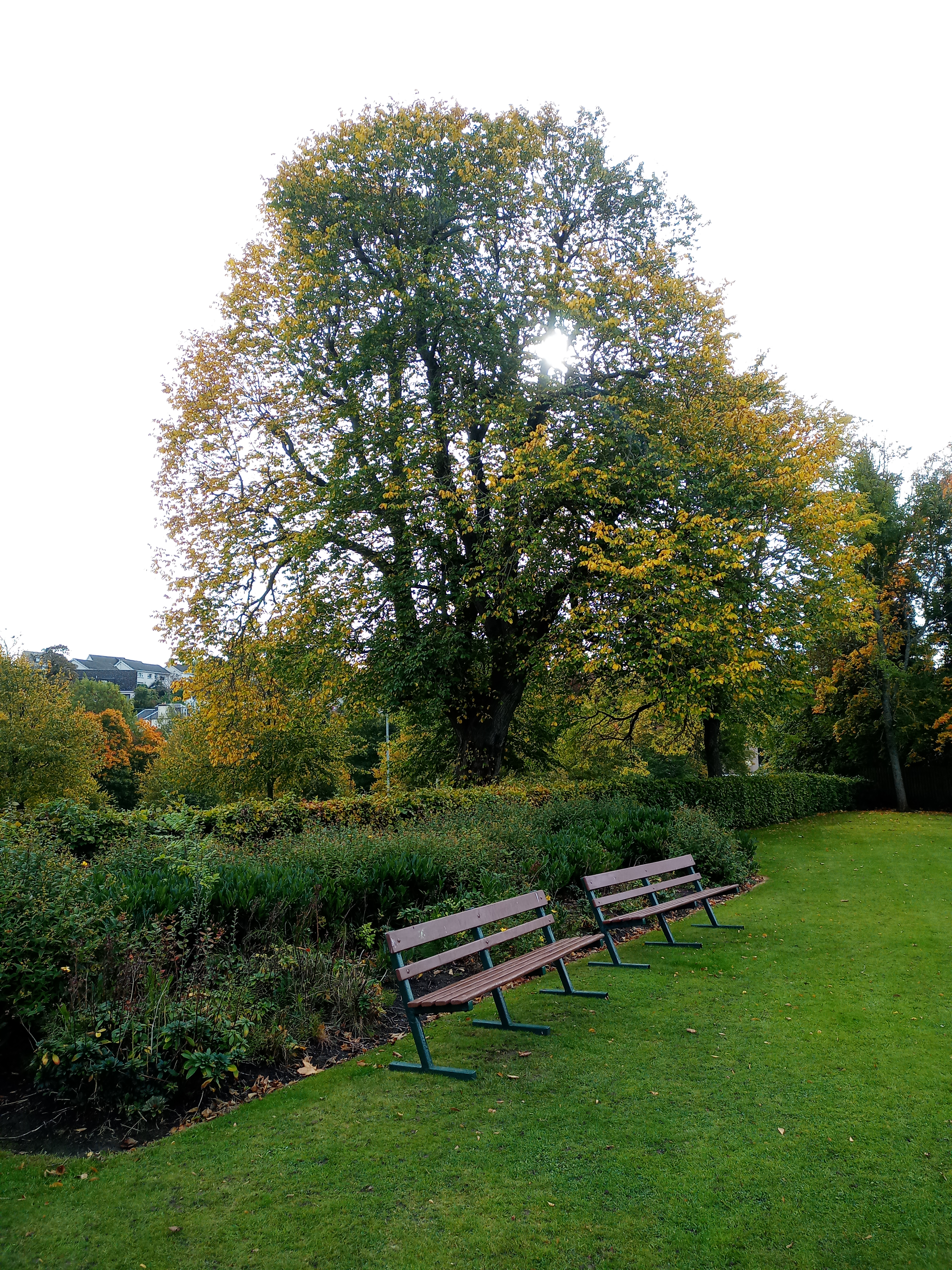
200-year-old wych, Jedburgh Abbey, a survivor (2024) in area of high DED infectivity

== Cultivation ==
The wych elm is moderately shade-tolerant, but requires deep, rich soils as typically found along river valleys. The species is intolerant of acid soils and flooding, as it is of prolonged drought. Although rarely used as a street tree owing to its shape, it can be surprisingly tolerant of urban air pollution, constricted growing conditions, and severe pollarding.

As wych elm does not sucker from the roots, and any seedlings are often consumed by uncontrolled deer populations, regeneration is very restricted, limited to sprouts from the stumps of young trees. The resultant decline has been extreme, and the wych elm is now uncommon over much of its former range. It is best propagated from seed or by layering stooled stock plants, although softwood cuttings taken in early June will root fairly reliably under mist.

Wych elm was widely planted in Edinburgh in the 19th century as a park and avenue tree, and despite losses, it remains abundant there, regenerating through seedlings. It was introduced to New England in the 18th century, and in the 19th century to Canada (as U. montana at the Dominion Arboretum, Ottawa), where a few old specimens survive, and to Australia.

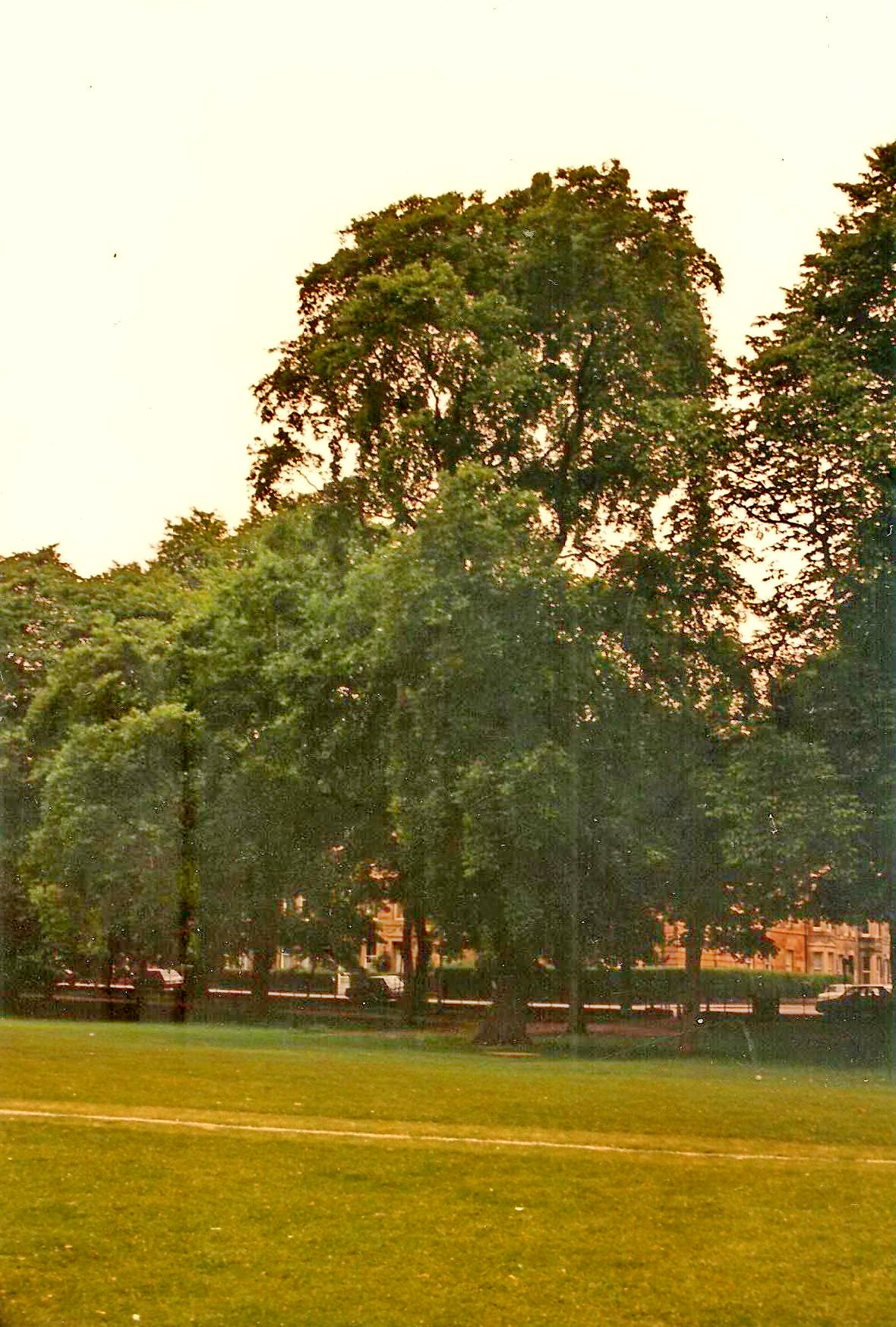
Wych, The Meadows, Edinburgh, 1989

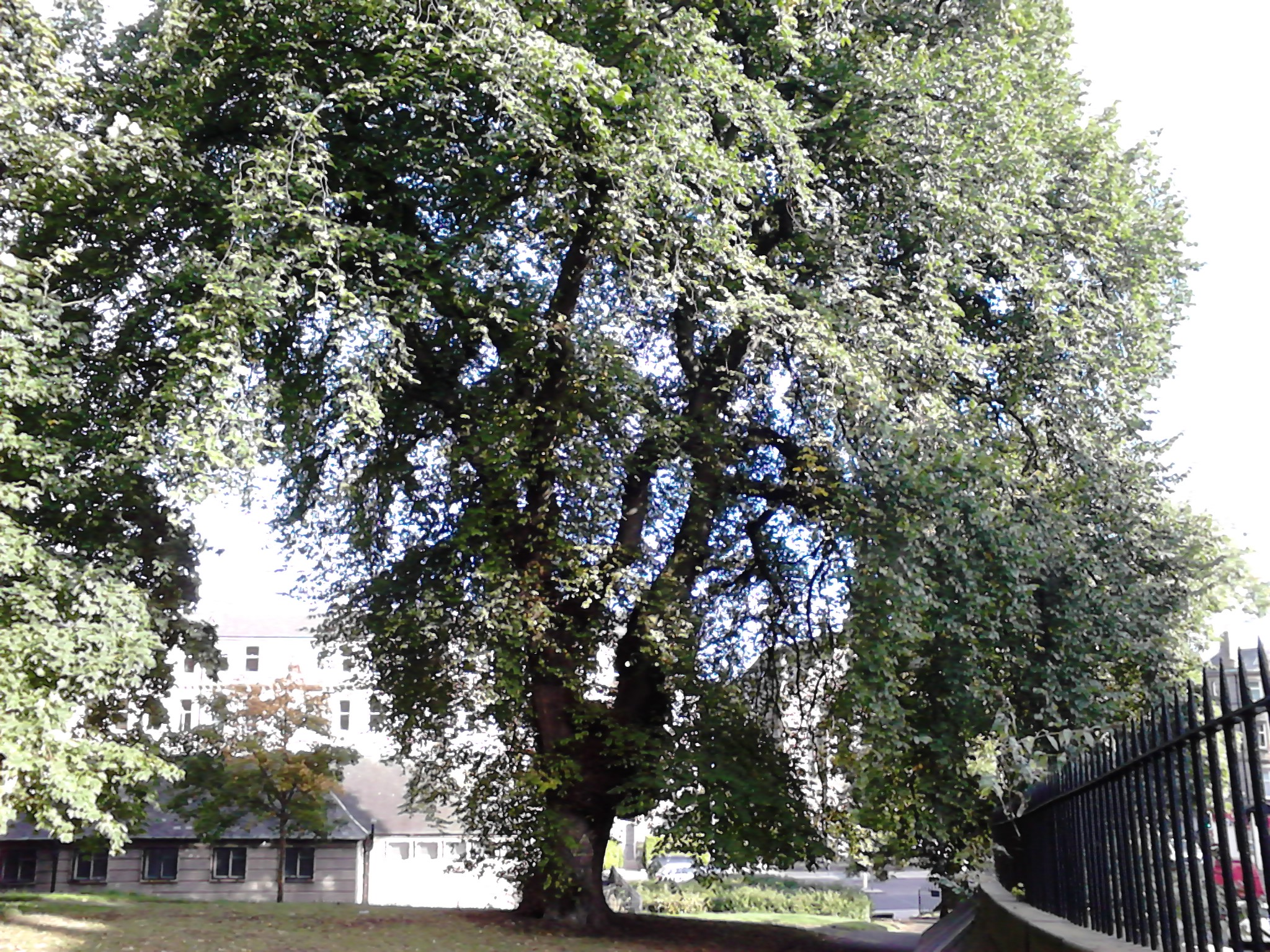
Burr-wych, Royal Terrace Gardens, Edinburgh, 2016

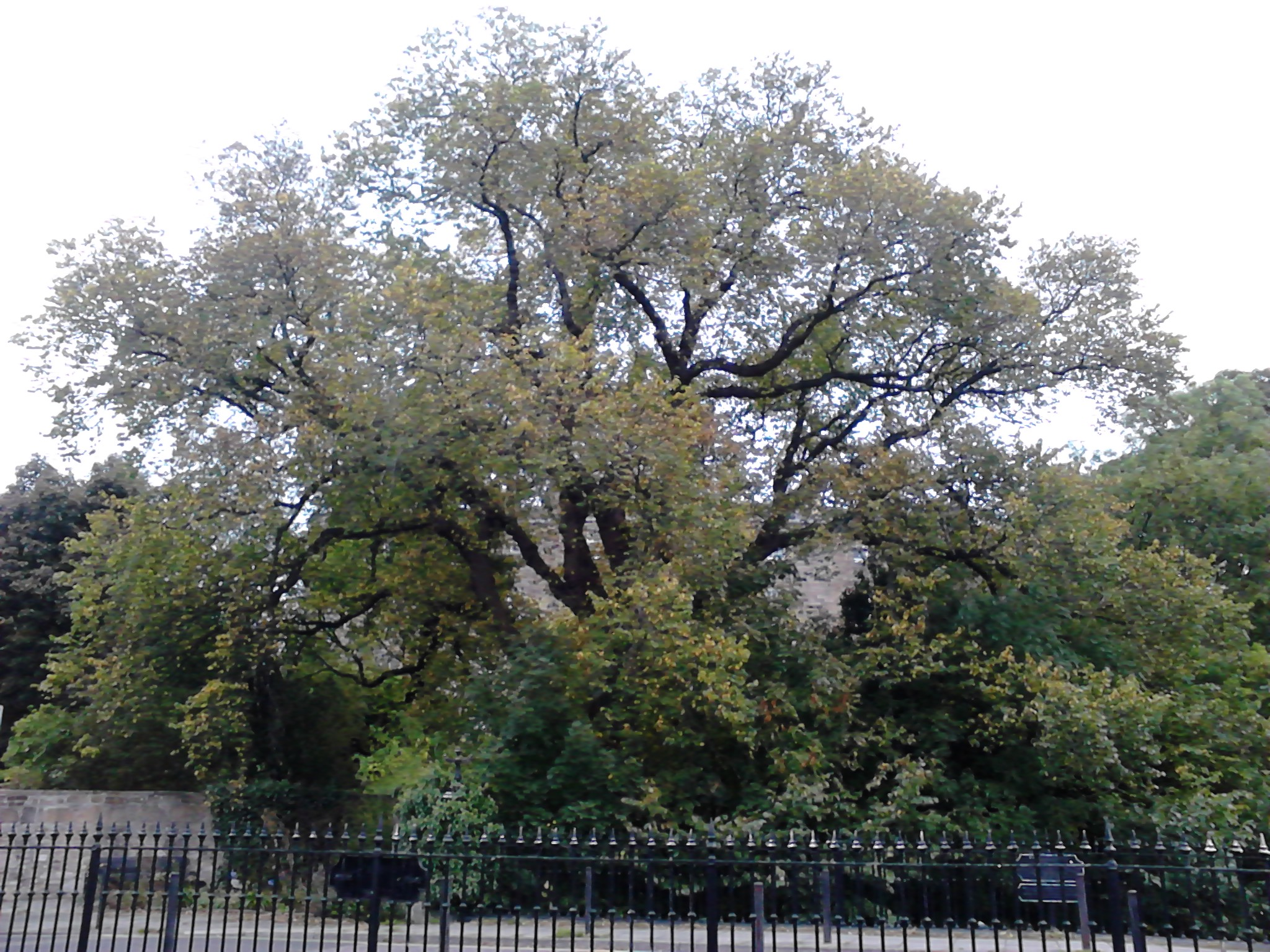
Burl-wych, Stockbridge, Edinburgh, 2016

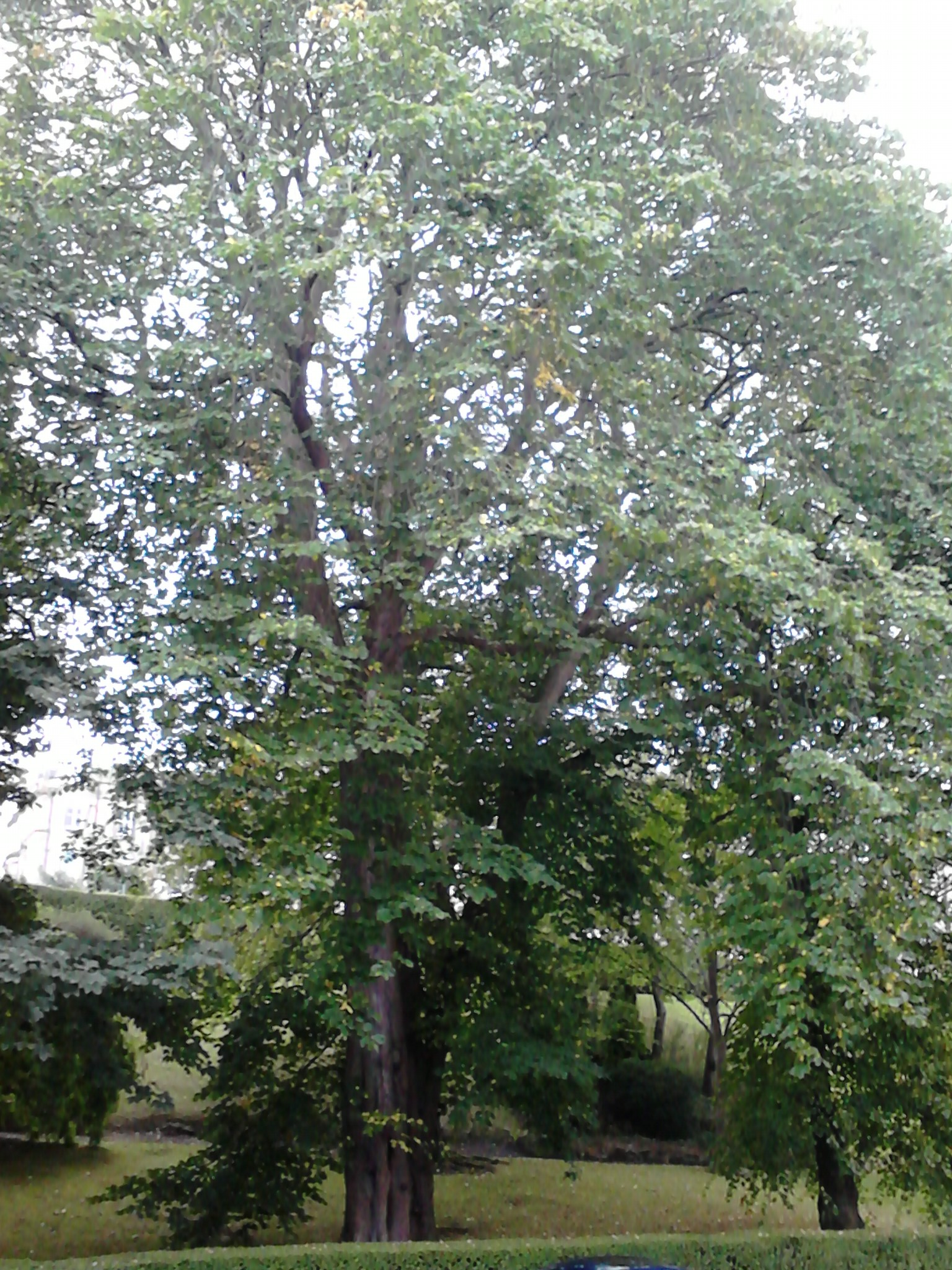
Wych, Learmonth Gardens, Edinburgh, 2016

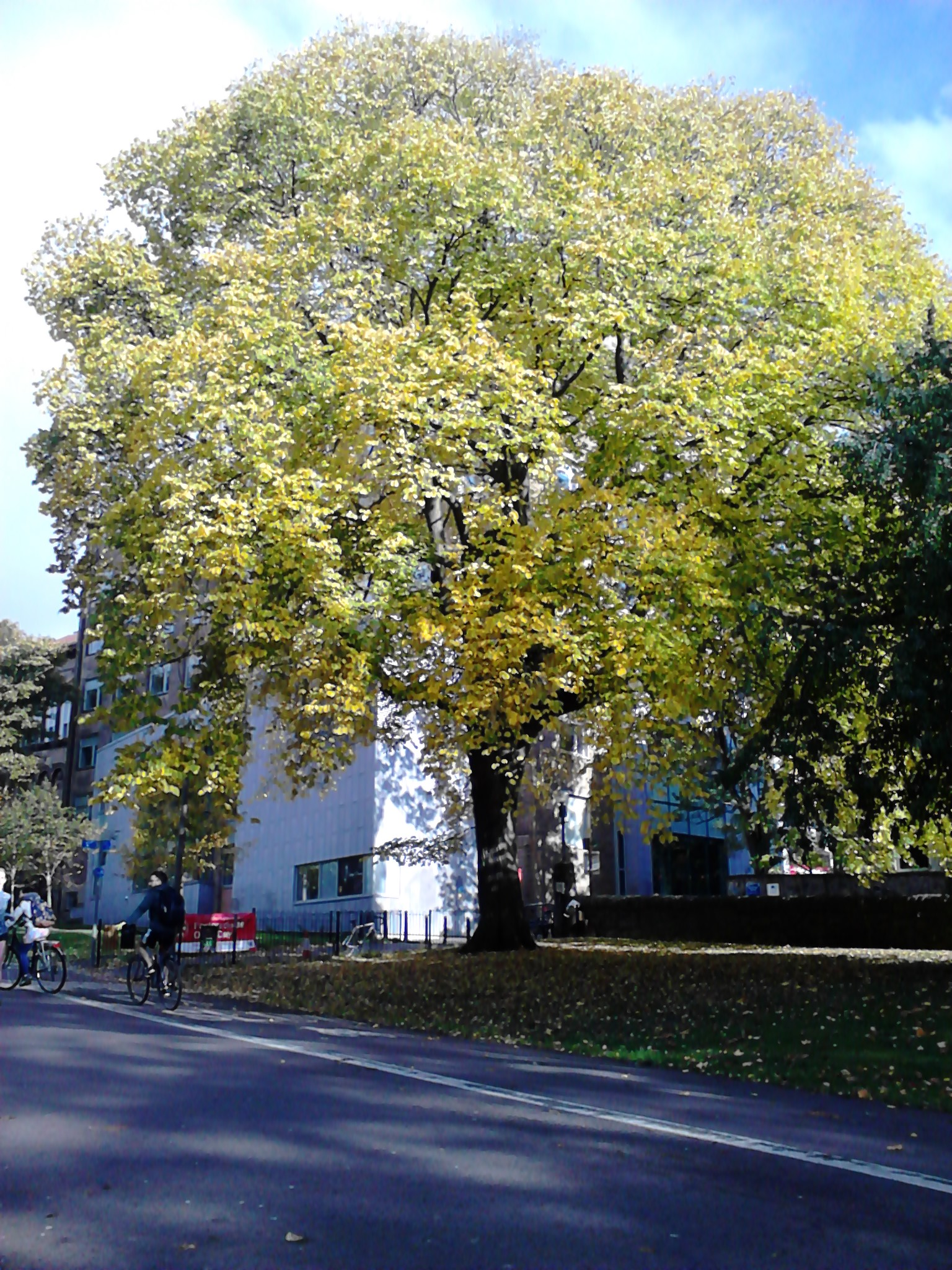
Wych, Middle Meadows Walk, Edinburgh, 2016

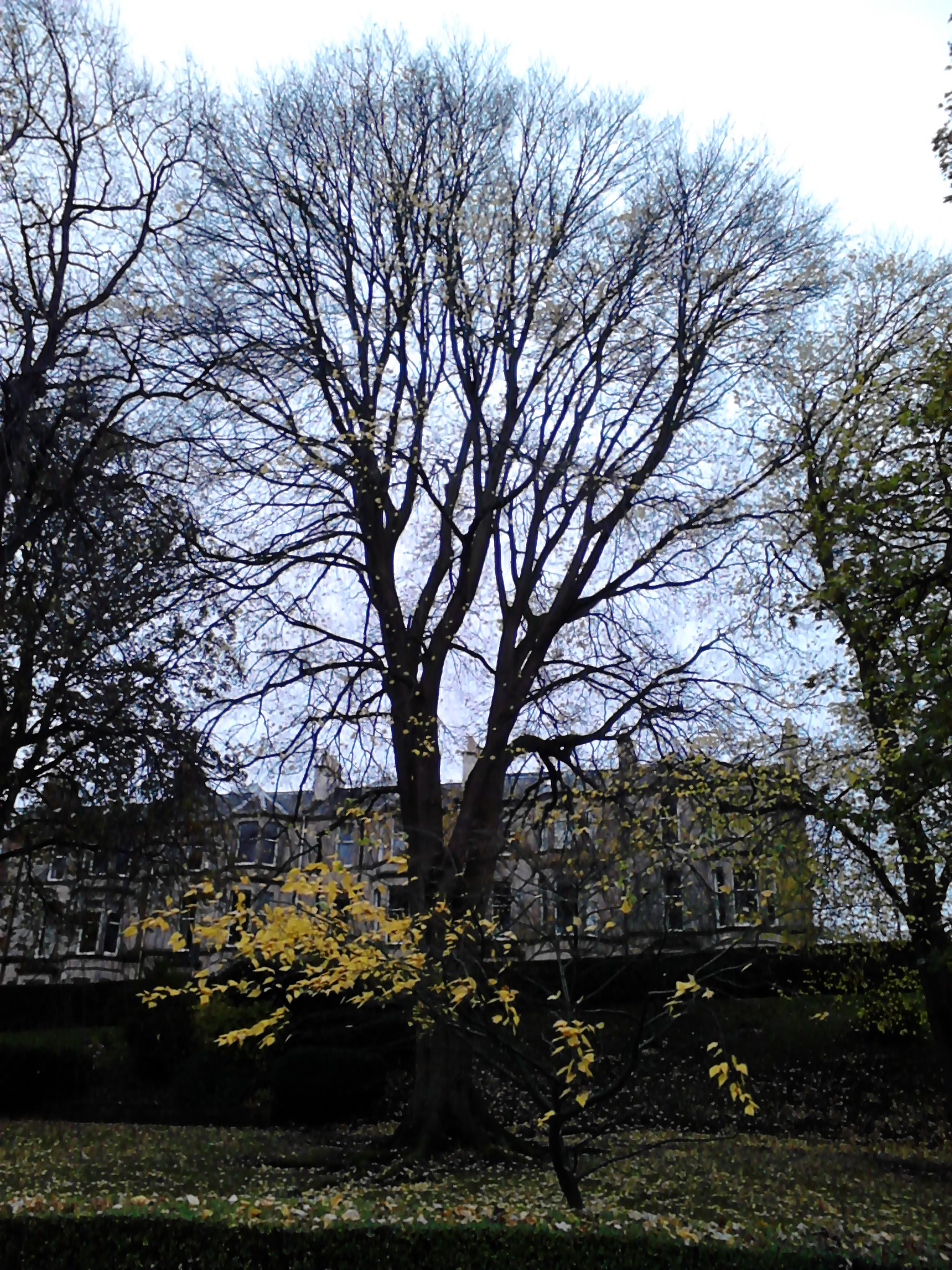
Fastigiate form of wych, Learmonth Gardens, Edinburgh, 2016

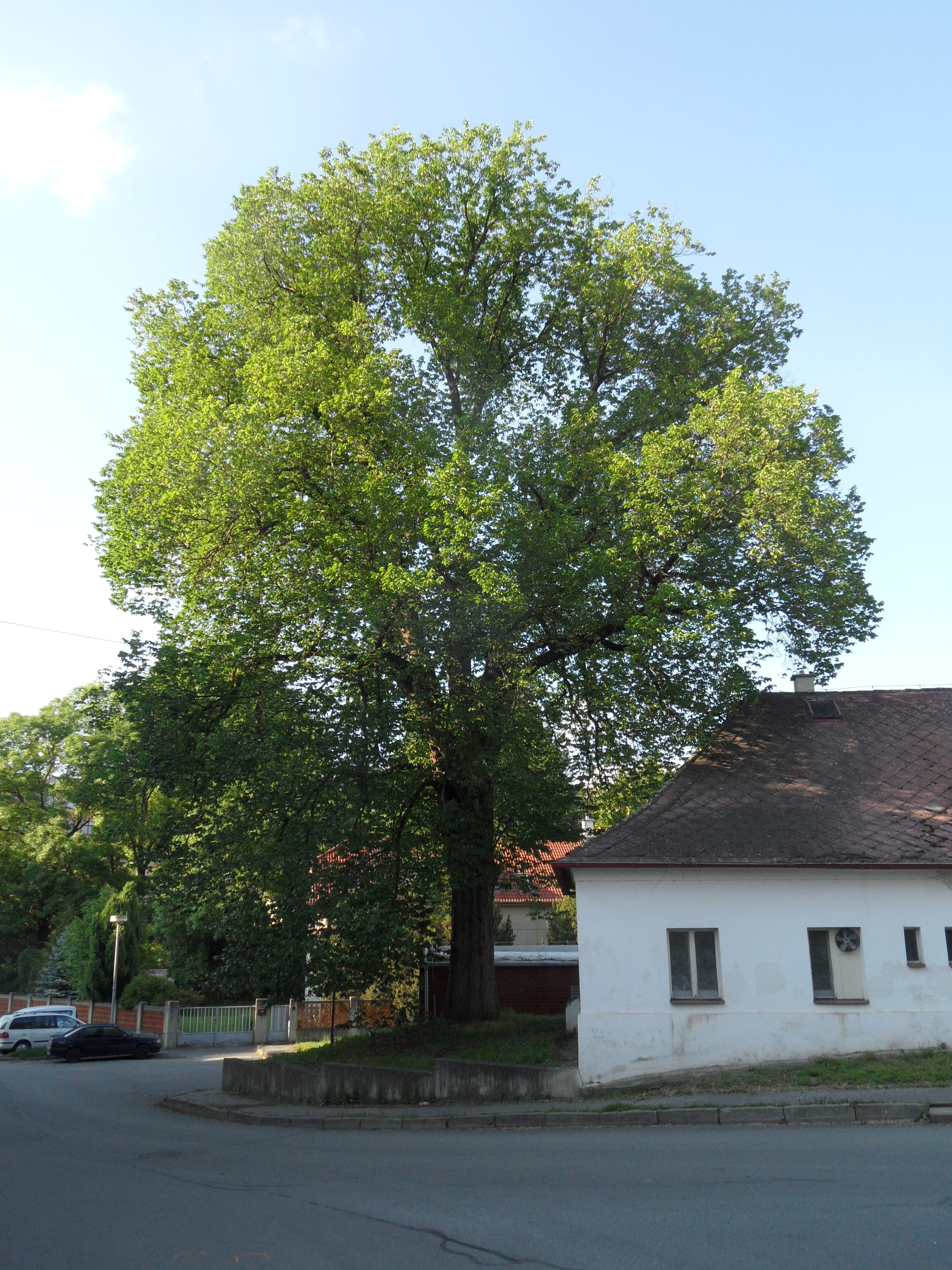
Ulmus glabra Huds., Pelhřimov, Czech Republic, 2017

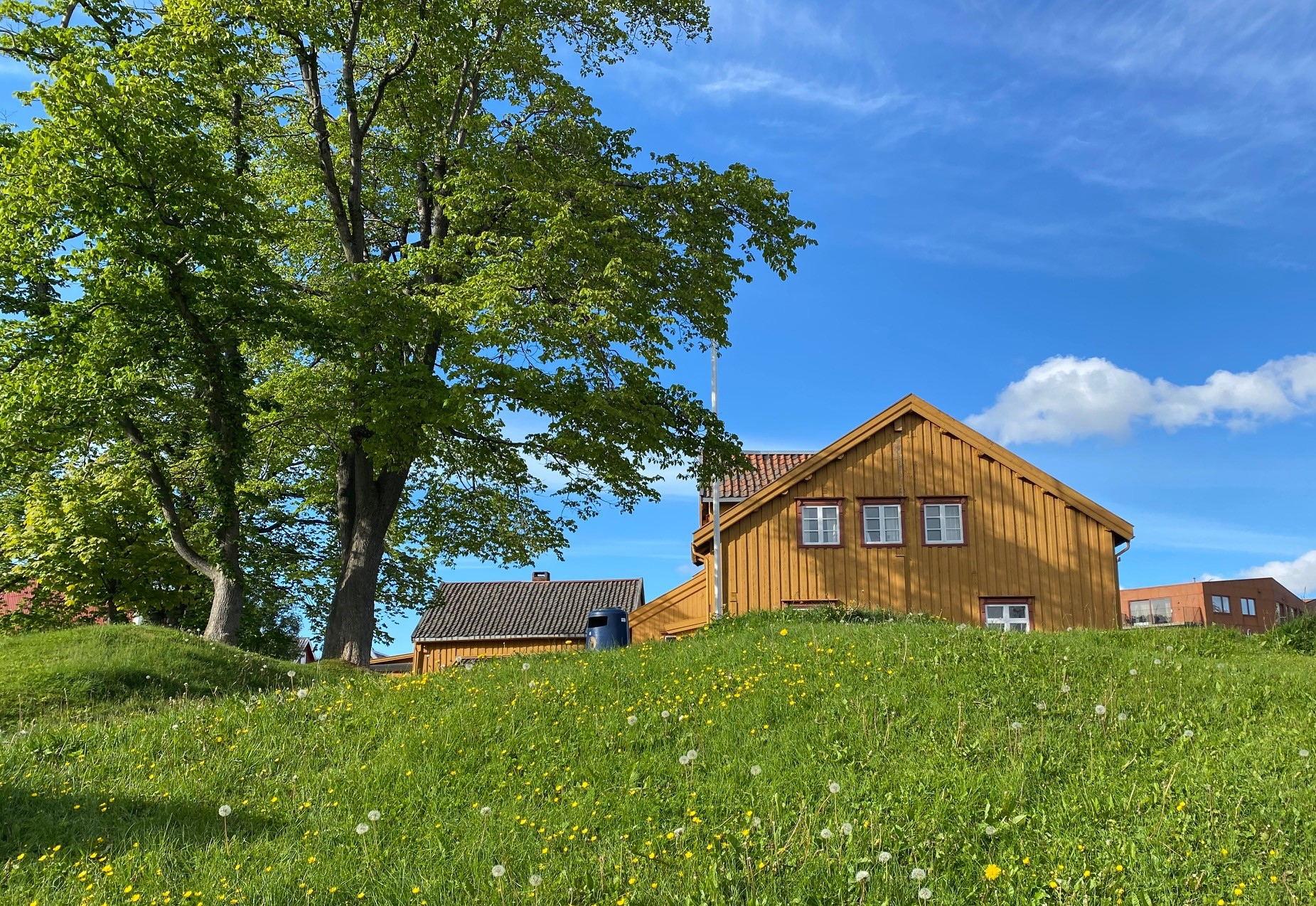
Tromsø, Norway, June 2022

== Uses ==
=== Lumber ===
Wych elm wood is prized by craftsmen for its colouring, its striking grain, its 'partridge-breast' or 'catspaw' markings, and when worked, its occasional iridescent greenish sheen or 'bloom'. The bosses on old trees produce the characteristic fissures and markings of 'burr elm' wood. Bosses fringed with shoots are burrs, whereas unfringed bosses are burls.

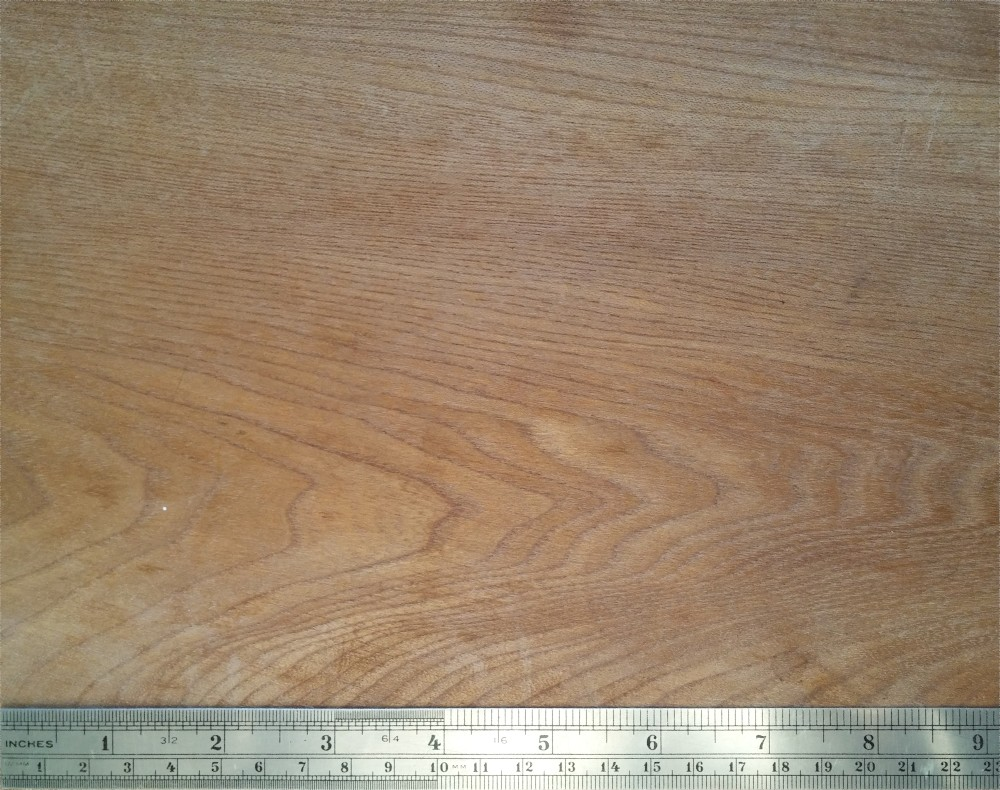
Untreated wood grain of wych elm

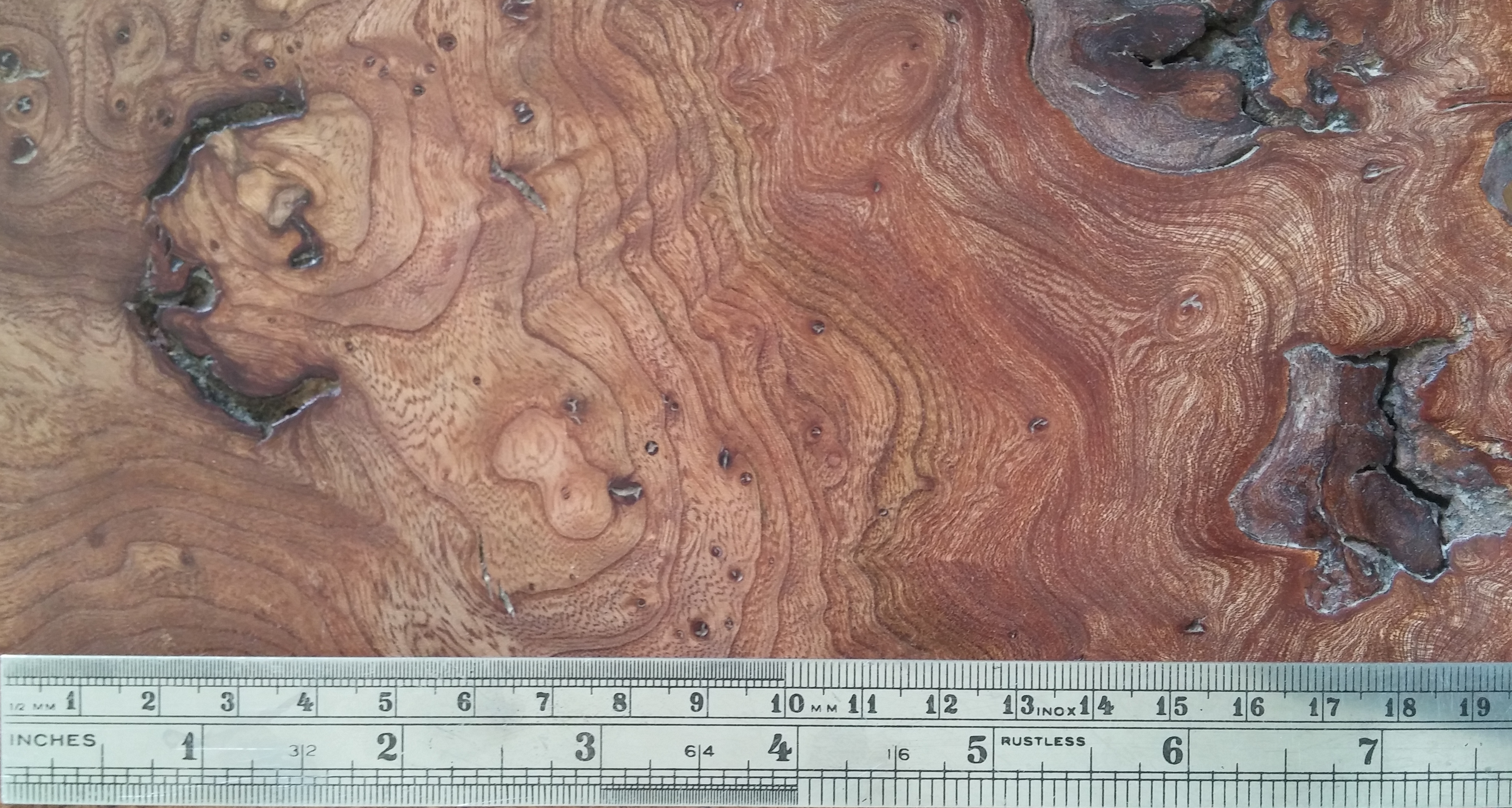
Waxed wood grain of burr wych elm

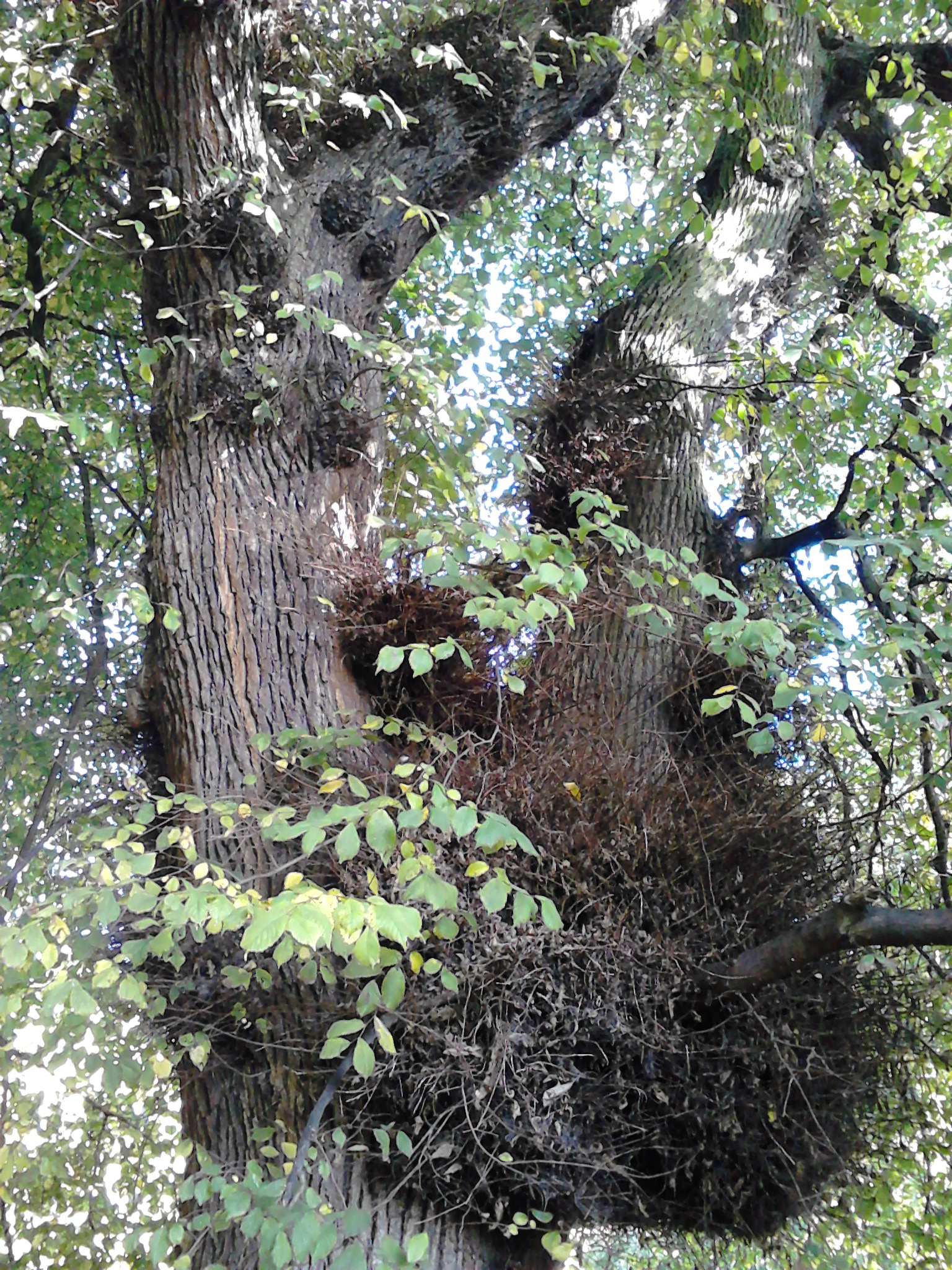
Burr on wych bole, Royal Terrace Gardens, Edinburgh

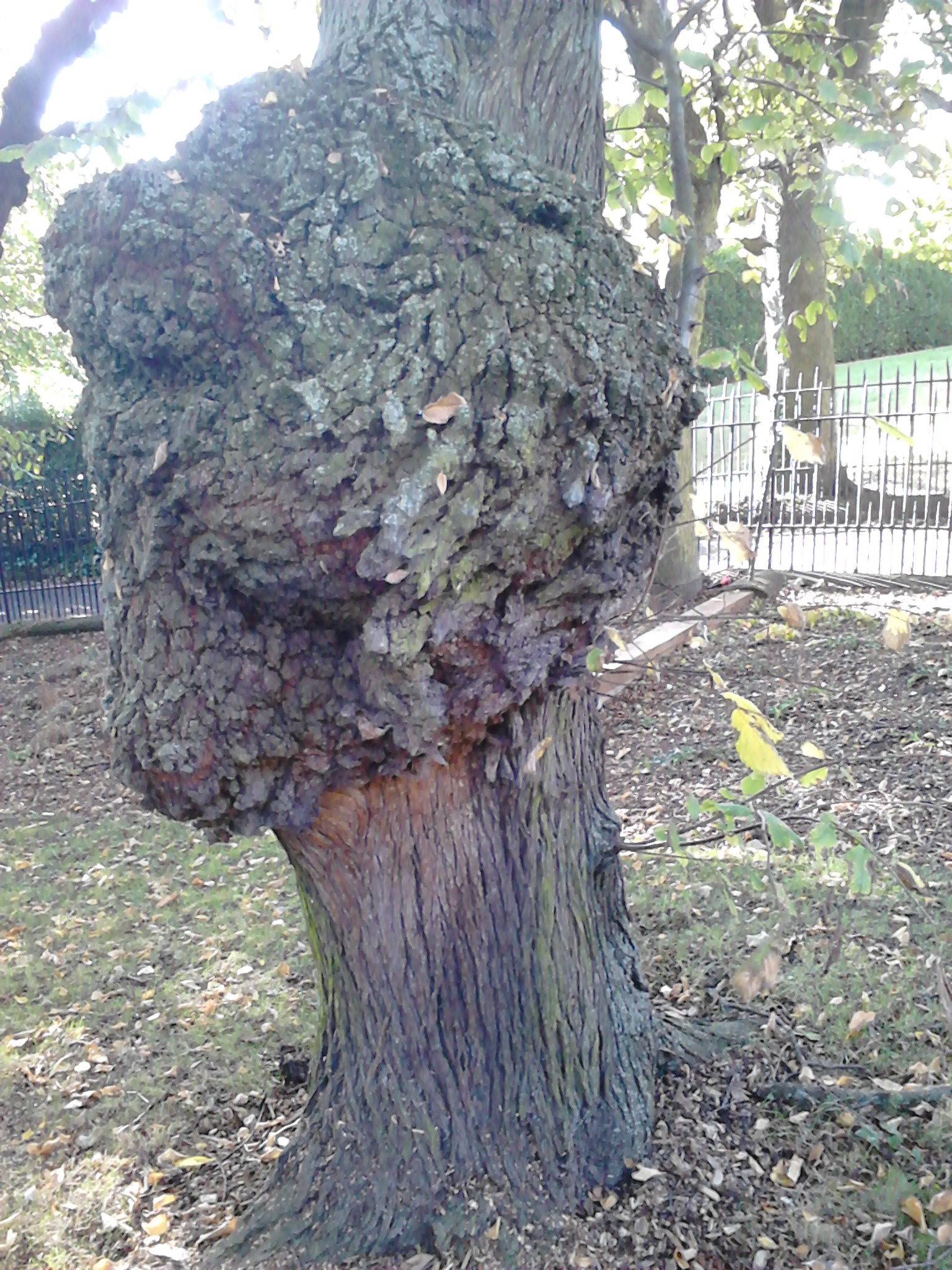
Burl on wych bole, Regent Road, Edinburgh

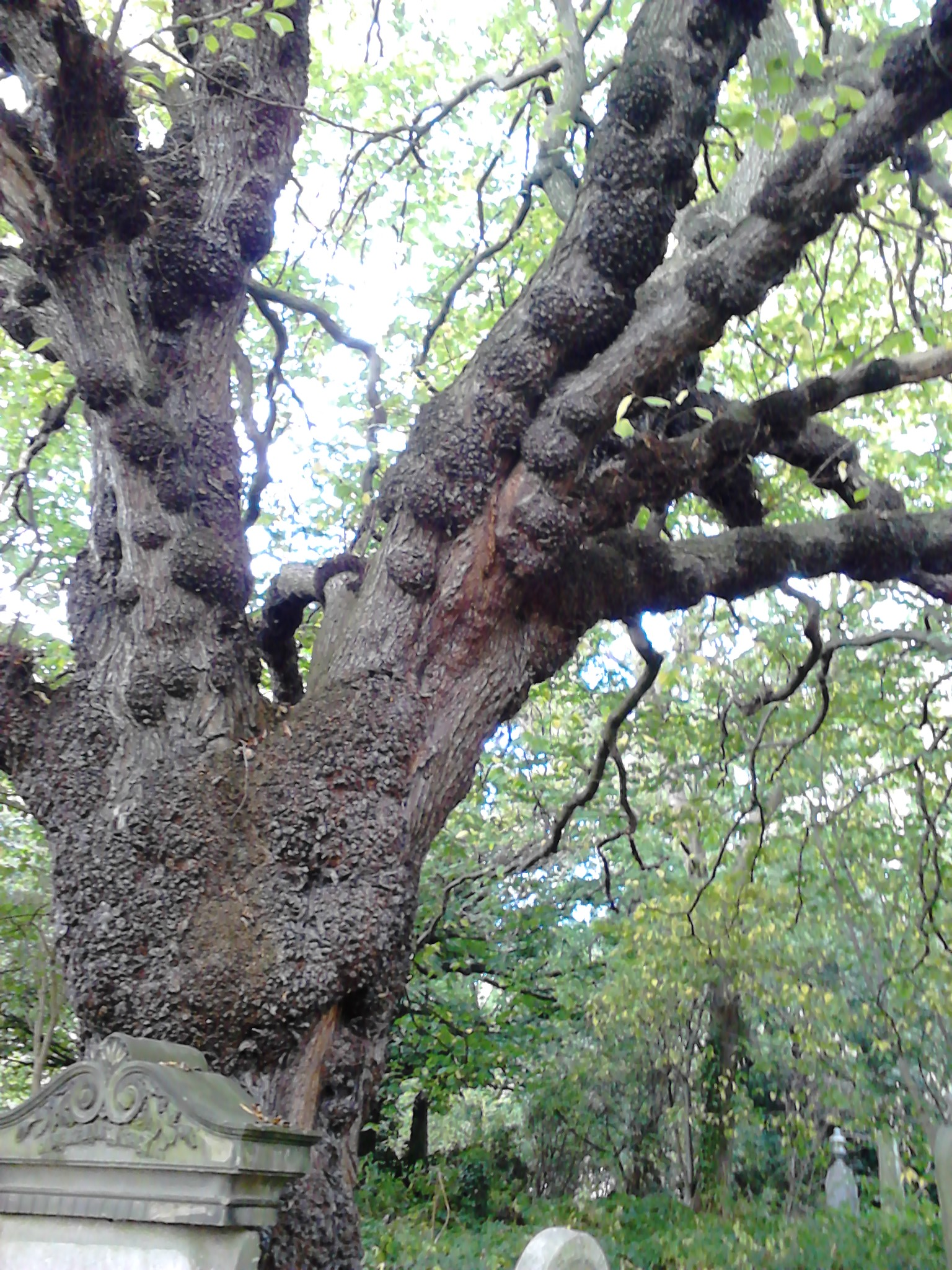
Burls on trunk and branches of wych elm, Dalry Cemetery, Edinburgh

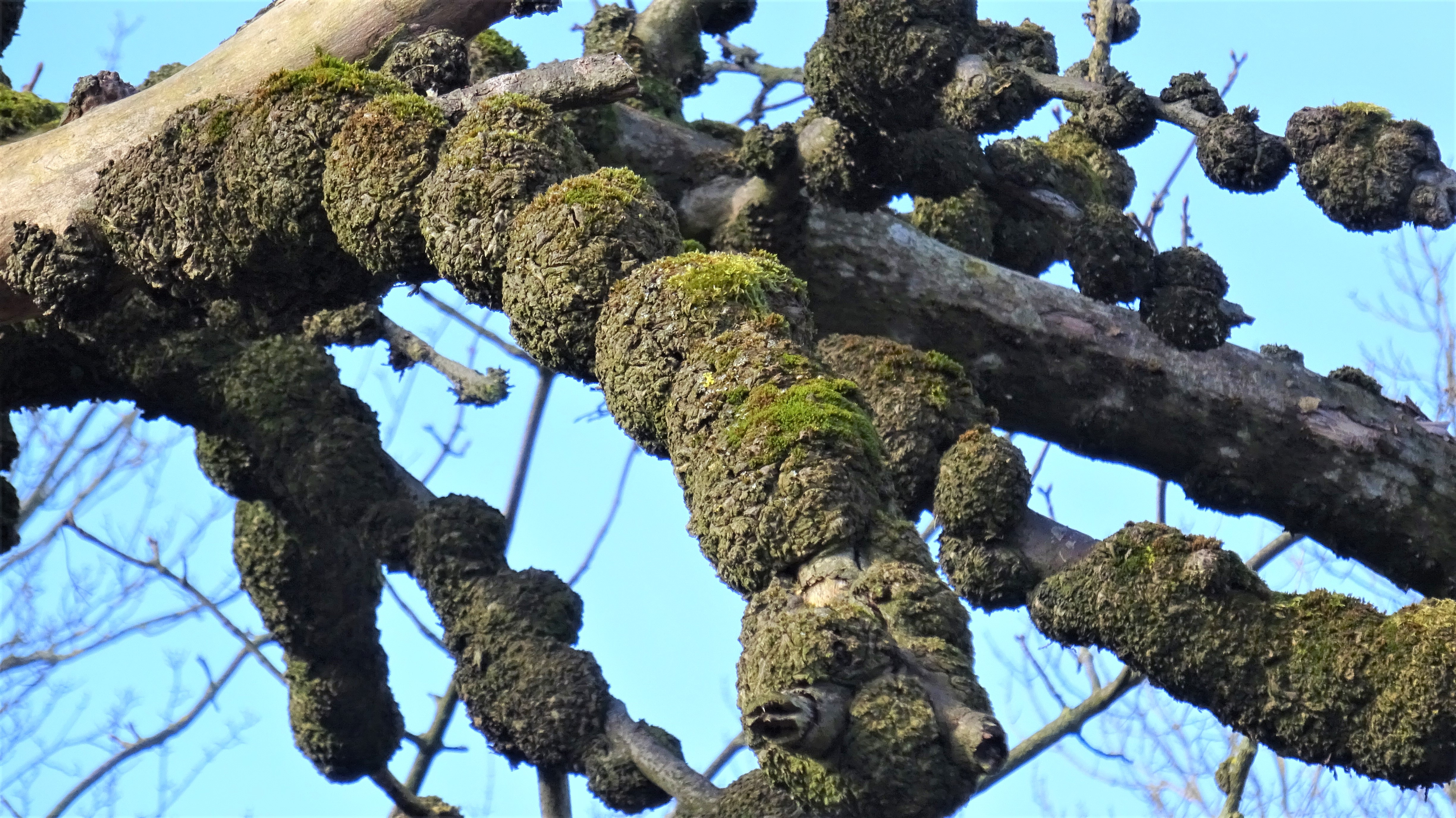
Crown galls (burls on outer branches) on wych elm, North Ayrshire

=== Medicine ===
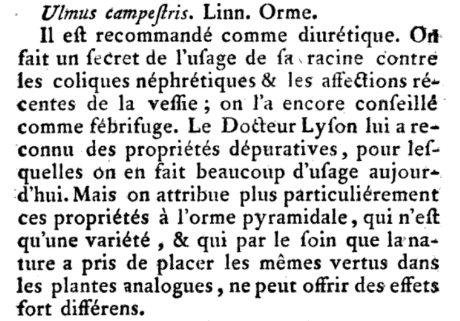
Medical properties of Ulmus campestris, Dijon, 1783

In 18th century France, the inner bark of Ulmus glabra, orme pyramidale, had a brief reputation as a panacea; "it was taken as a powder, as an extract, as an elixir, even in baths. It was good for the nerves, the chest, the stomach — what can I say? — it was a true panacea." It was this so-called "pyramidal elm bark" about which Michel-Philippe Bouvart famously quipped "Take it, Madame... and hurry up while it [still] cures." It still appeared in a pharmacopeia of 1893.

== Notable trees ==
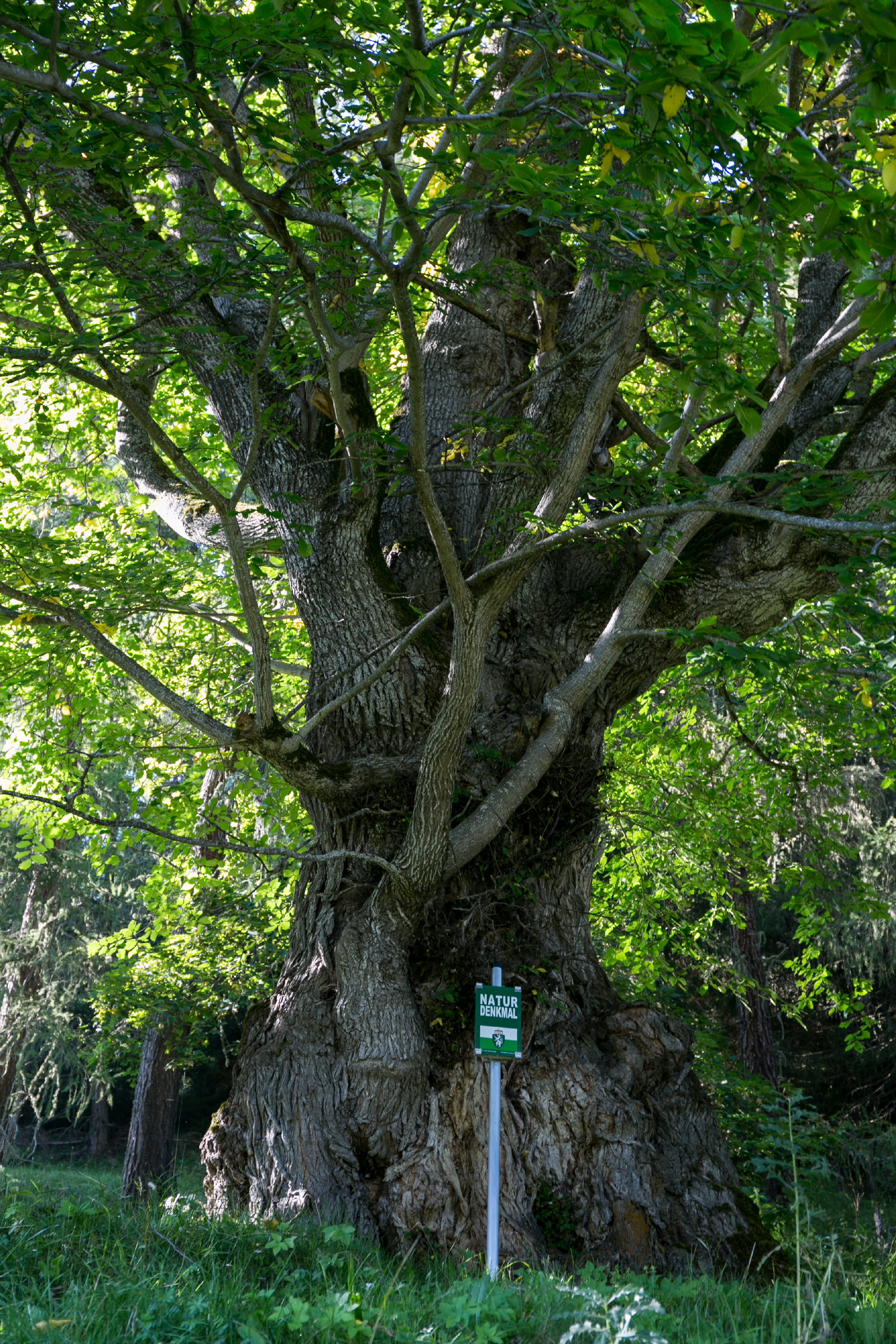
Ancient U. glabra in Styria, Austria

Possibly the oldest wych elm in Europe grew at Beauly Priory in Inverness-shire, Scotland; the tree succumbed to Dutch elm disease in 2022 and collapsed the following year. The priory was founded circa 1230, the tree already in existence.

The UK Champion listed in the Tree Register of the British Isles was at Brahan in the Scottish Highlands (died 2021); it had a girth of 703 cm (2.23 m DBH) and a height of 24 m. Possibly the oldest specimen in England was found in 2018 in a field north of Hopton Castle in Shropshire. Coppiced long ago, its bole girth measured 6.3 m in 2018. The oldest specimen in Edinburgh is believed to be the tree (girth 5.2 m) in the former grounds of Duddingston House, now Duddingston Golf Course. Other notable specimens in Edinburgh are to be found in Learmonth Gardens and The Meadows.

In Europe, a large tree planted in 1620 grows at Bergemolo, 5 km south of Demonte in Piedmont, Italy (bole-girth 6.2 m, 2.0 m DBH, height 26 m., 2008). Other ancient specimens grow at Styria, in Austria, and at Grenzhammer, Germany (see Gallery).

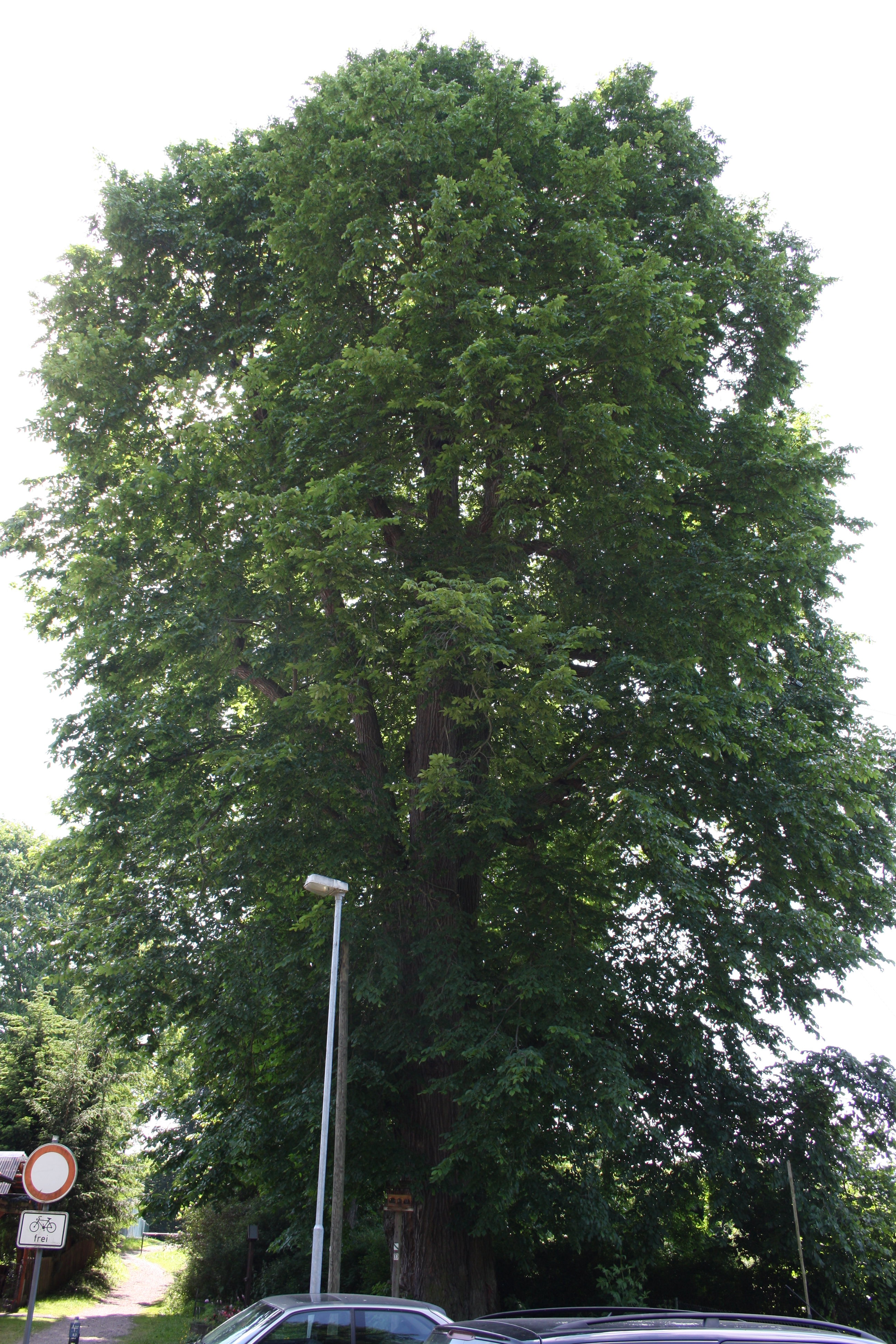
300-year-old U. glabra (after lopping), Grenzhammer, Ilmenau, Germany (2010)

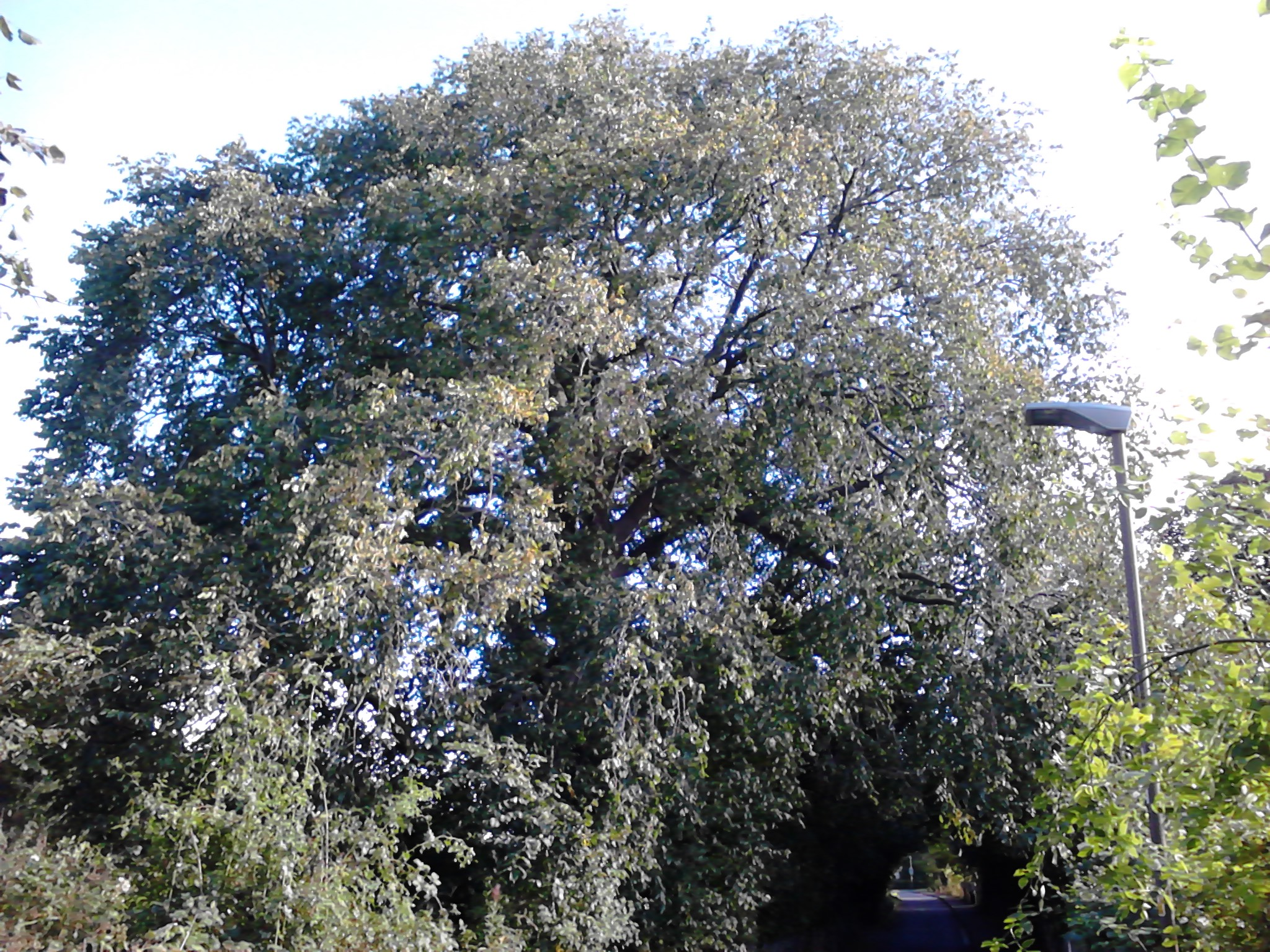
The Duddingston elm (bole girth 5.2 m), Edinburgh (2016)

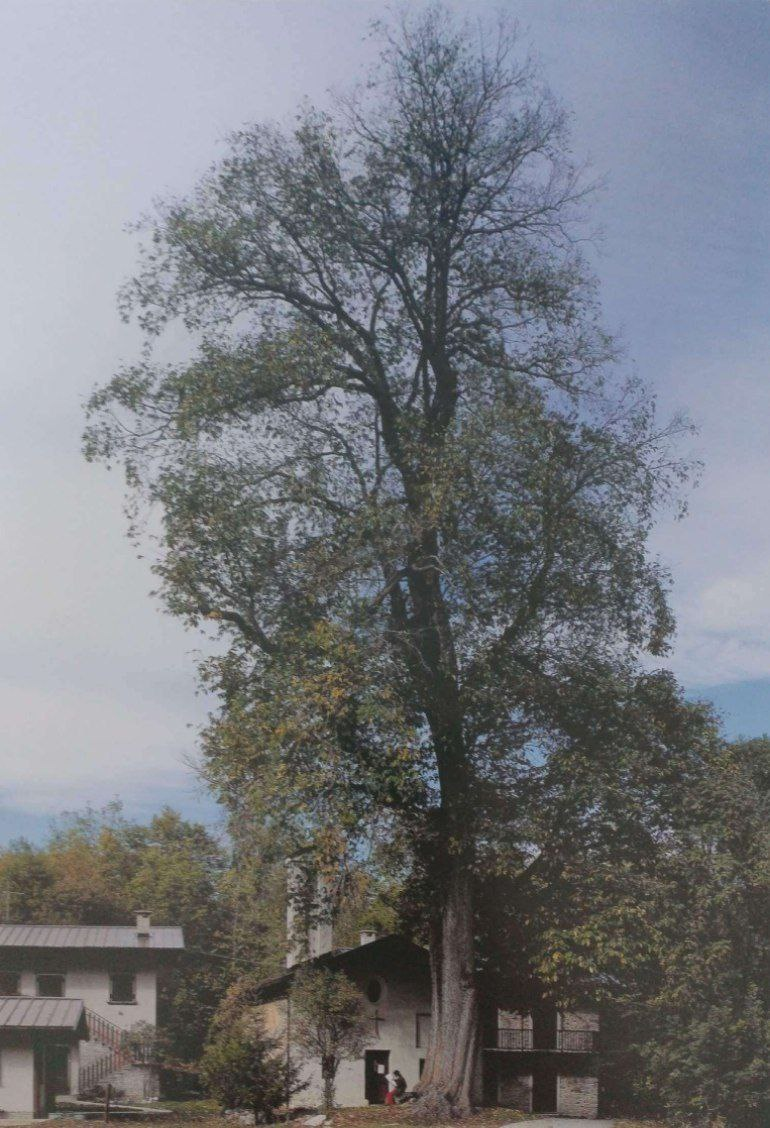
"L'Olmo montano di Bergemolo", planted 1620, Bergemolo, Piedmont, Italy (2004)

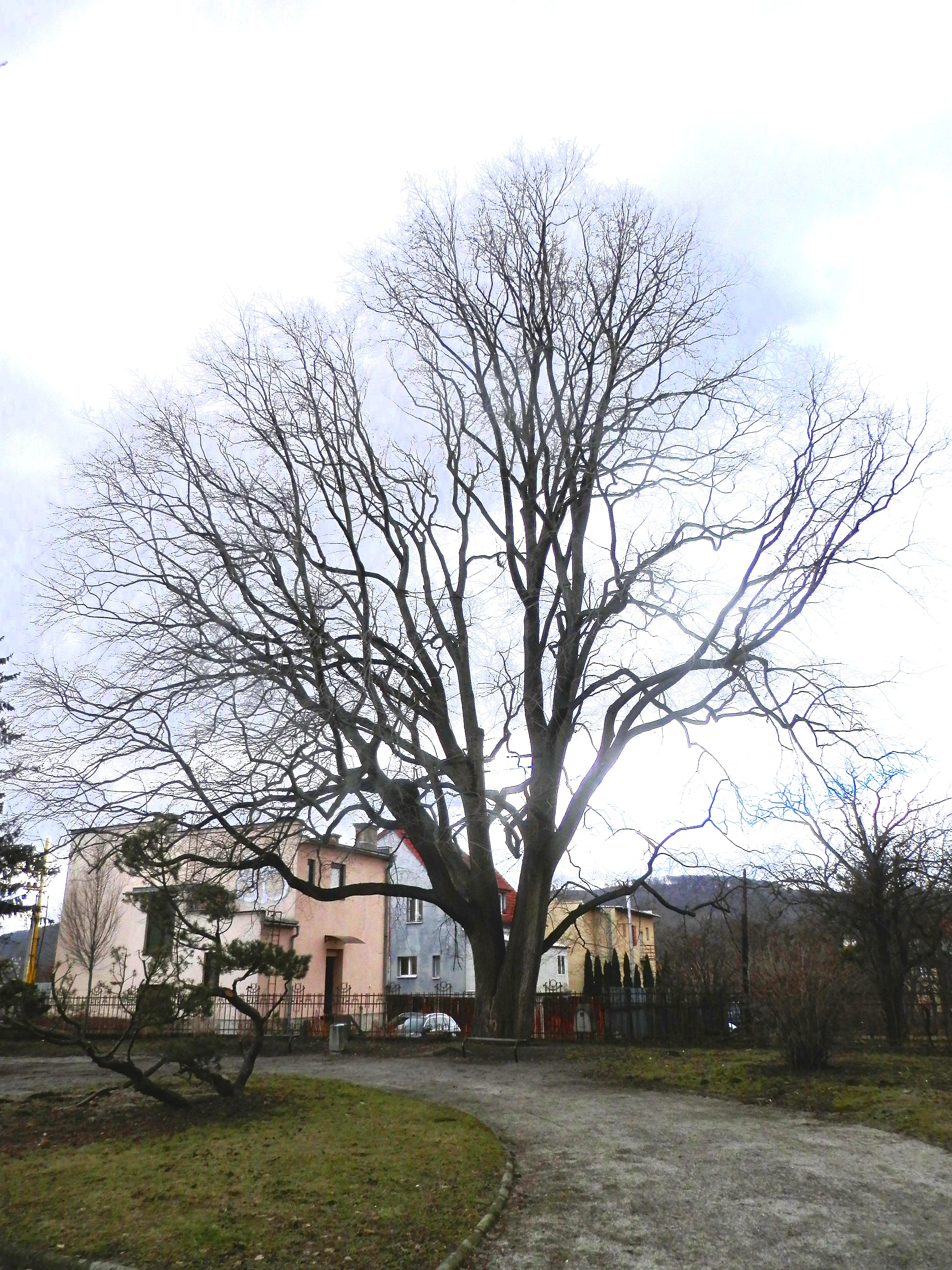
A c.200-year-old forked wych (bole girth 4 m), Čiernom Moste Park, Škultétyho, Prešov, Slovakia (2019)

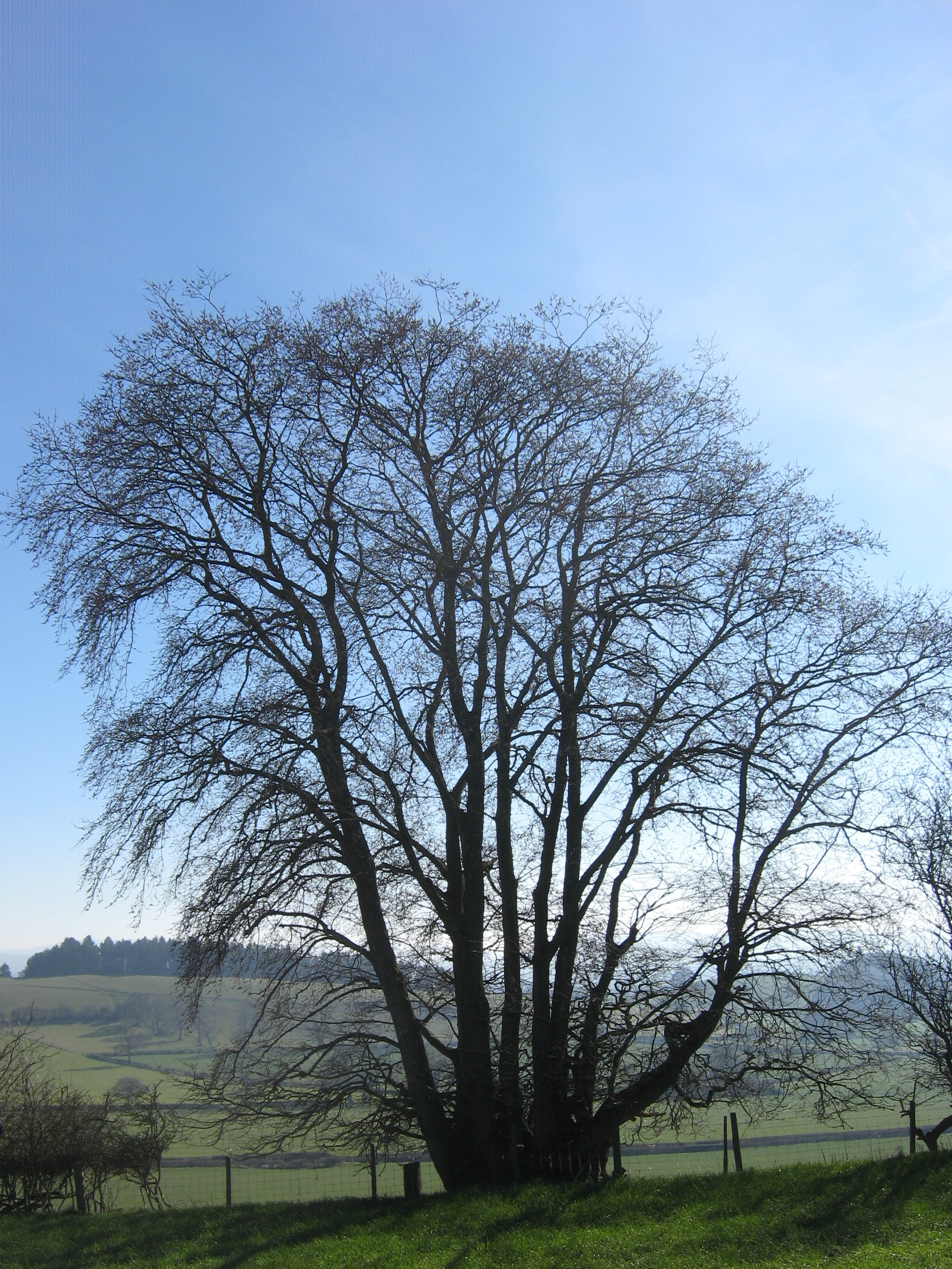
Coppiced U. glabra, Hopton Castle, Shropshire, England (2019)

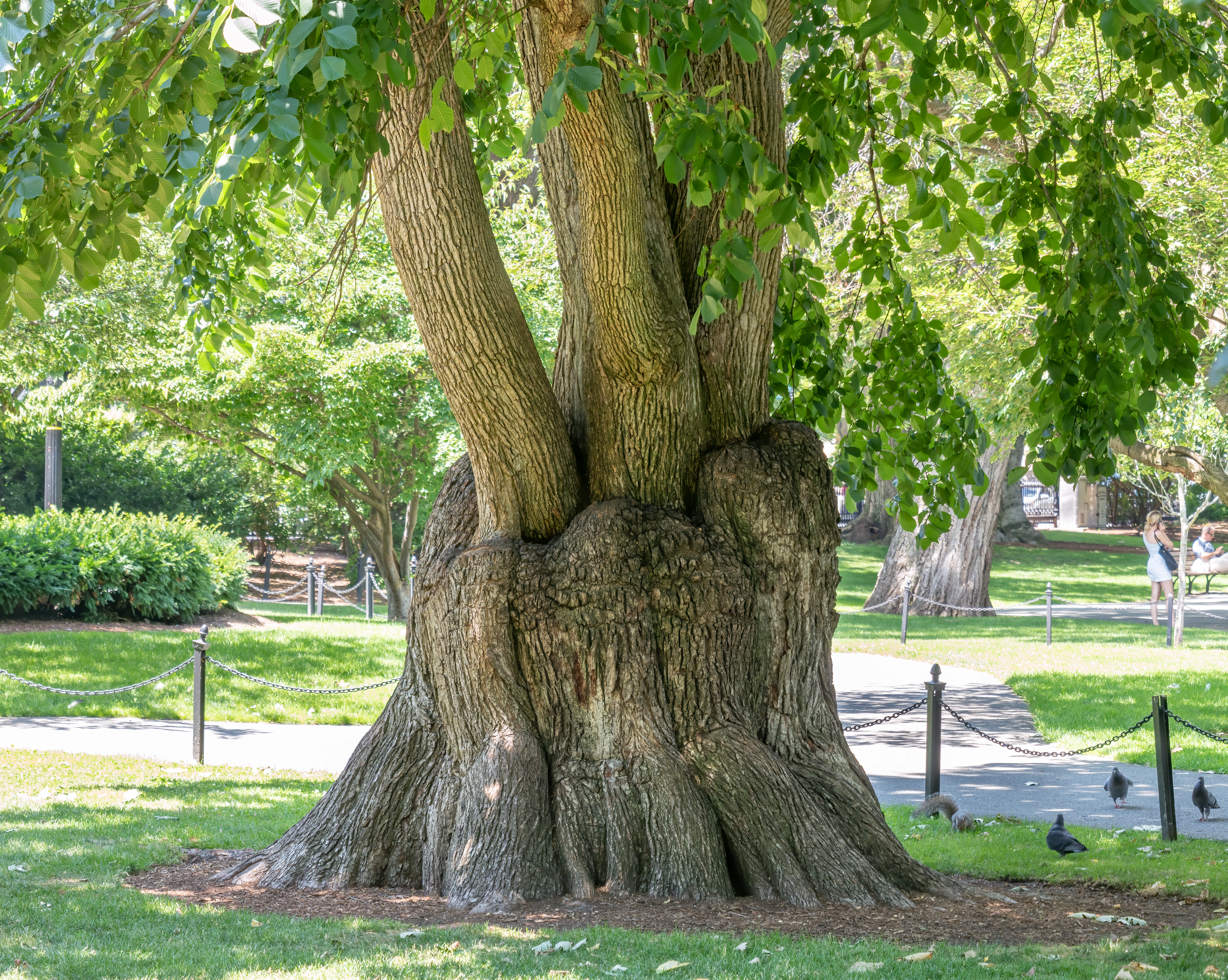
Old wych regenerating, Boston Public Garden (2022)

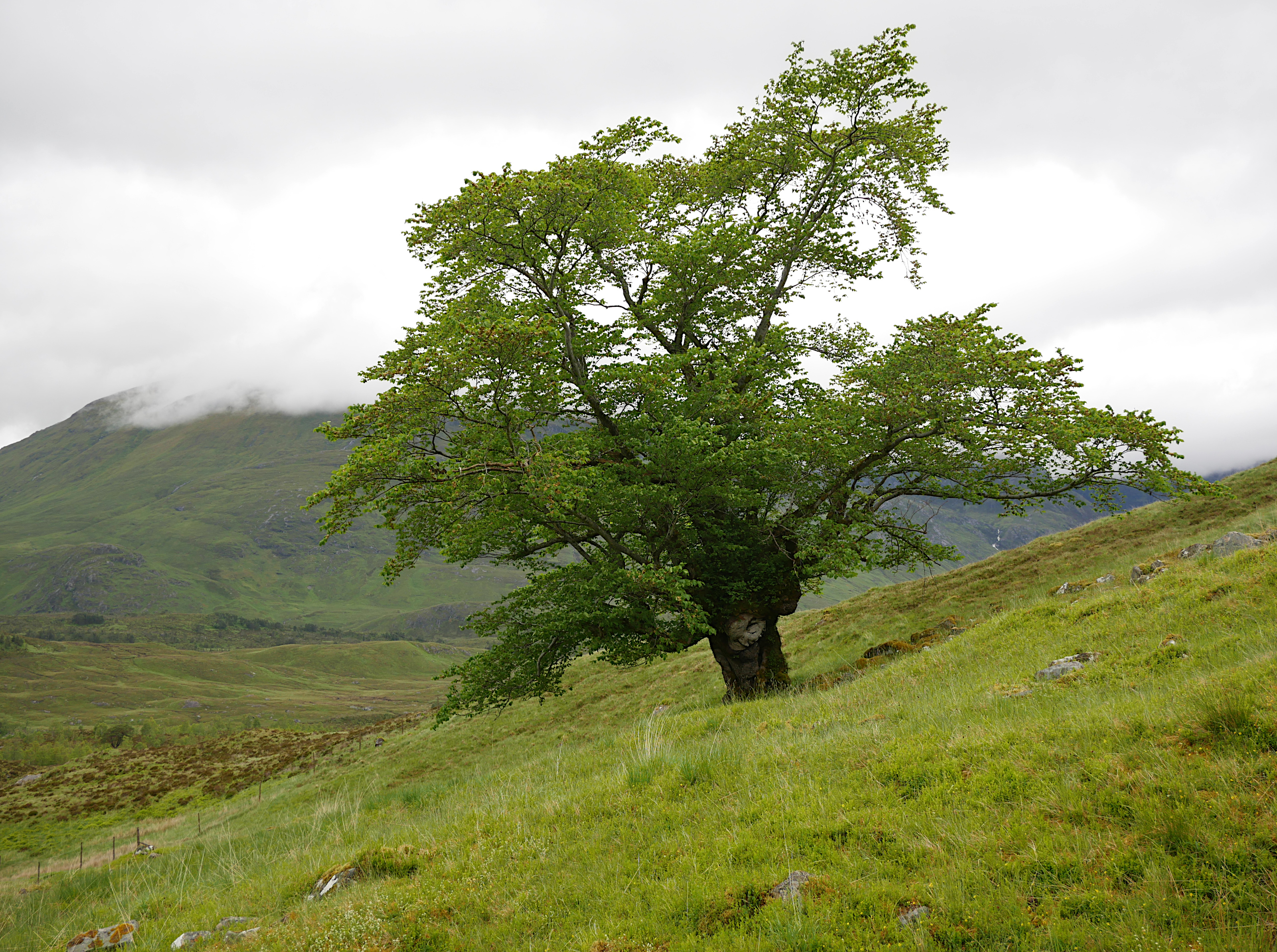
The Last Ent of Affric, Glen Affric (2022)

== In literature ==
E. M. Forster cites a particular wych elm, one that grew at his childhood home of Rooks Nest, Stevenage, Hertfordshire, 16 times in his novel Howards End. This tree overhangs the house of the title and is said to have a "...girth that a dozen men could not have spanned..." Forster describes the tree as "...a comrade, bending over the house, strength and adventure in its roots." The wych elm of the novel had pigs' teeth embedded in the trunk by country people long ago and it was said that chewing some of the bark could cure toothache. In keeping with the novel's epigraph, "Only connect...", the wych elm may be seen by some as a symbol of the connection of humans to the earth. Margaret Schlegel, the novel's protagonist, fears that any "....westerly gale might blow the wych elm down and bring the end of all things..." The tree is changed to a chestnut in the 1991 film adaptation of Howards End.

== Cultivars ==
About 40 cultivars have been raised, although at least 30 are now probably lost to cultivation as a consequence of Dutch elm disease and/or other factors:

- Albo-Variegata
- Australis
- Camperdownii
- Cebennensis
- Concavaefolia
- Cornuta
- Corylifolia Purpurea
- Corylifolia
- Fastigiata Macrophylla
- Fastigiata Stricta
- Fastigiata Variegata
- Firma
- Flava
- Gigantea
- Gittisham
- Grandidentata
- Holgeri
- Horizontalis
- Insularis
- Latifolia
- Latifolia Aurea
- Latifolia Aureo-Variegata
- Latifolia Nigricans
- Luteo Variegata
- Lutescens
- Macrophylla
- Maculata
- Minor
- Nana
- Nitida
- Nigra
- Oblongata
- Pendula Macrophylla
- Pendula Variegata
- Pyrenaica
- Spectabilis
- Superba
- Tomentosa

'Exoniensis', Exeter Elm, has traditionally been classified as a form of U. glabra.

== Hybrids and hybrid cultivars ==
U. glabra hybridises naturally with U. minor, producing elms of the Ulmus × hollandica group, from which have arisen a number of cultivars:

- Ademuz
- Alba
- Angustifolia
- Balder
- Belgica
- Blandford
- Canadian Giant
- Cicestria
- Cinerea
- Commelin
- Dampieri
- Dauvessei
- Daveyi
- Dehesa de Amaniel
- Dovaei
- Dumont
- Elegantissima
- Eleganto-Variegata
- Etrusca
- Fastigiata
- Fjerrestad
- Folia Rhomboidea
- Freja
- Fulva
- Gaujardii
- Groeneveld
- Haarlemensis
- Klemmer
- Loke
- Macrophylla Aurea
- Majadahonda
- Major
- Microphylla
- Modiolina
- Muscaviensis
- Nottingham
- Odin
- Pioneer
- Pitteurs
- Serpentina
- Smithii
- Superba
- Tricolor
- Tyr
- Vegeta
- Viminalis
- Viscosa
- Wentworthii Pendula
- Wredei
- Ypreau

However, hybrids of U. glabra and U. pumila, the Siberian elm, have not been observed in the field and only achieved in the laboratory, though the ranges of the two species, the latter introduced by man, overlap in parts of Southern Europe, notably Spain. A crossing in Russia of U. glabra and U. pumila produced the hybrid named Ulmus × arbuscula; a similar crossing was cloned ('FL025') by the Istituto per la Protezione delle Piante (IPP), Florence, as part of the Italian elm breeding programme circa 2000.

Hybrids with U. glabra in their ancestry have featured strongly in recent artificial hybridisation experiments in Europe, notably at Wageningen in the Netherlands, and a number of hybrid cultivars have been commercially released since 1960. The earlier trees were raised in response to the initial Dutch elm disease pandemic that afflicted Europe after the First World War, and were to prove vulnerable to the much more virulent strain of the disease that arrived in the late 1960s. However, further research eventually produced several trees effectively immune to disease, which were released after 1989.

- Arno, Clusius, Columella, Commelin, Den Haag, Dodoens, Groeneveld, Homestead, Lobel, Nanguen = Lutèce, Pioneer, Plinio, Regal, San Zanobi, Urban, Wanoux = Vada.

== Accessions ==
Europe

- [Held in nearly all arboreta]

North America

- Arnold Arboretum, US. Acc. no. 391–2001, wild collected in Georgia
- Bartlett Tree Experts, US. Acc. nos. 1505, 5103, origin undisclosed
- Dawes Arboretum , US. 6 trees, no acc. details available
- Missouri Botanical Garden , US. Acc. nos. 1969–6164, 1986–0160
- Morton Arboretum, US. Acc. nos. 591–54, 255–81, and by its synonym U. sukaczevii, acc. nos. 949–73, 181–76

Australasia

- Eastwoodhill Arboretum , Gisborne, New Zealand. 8 trees, details not known.

== In art ==
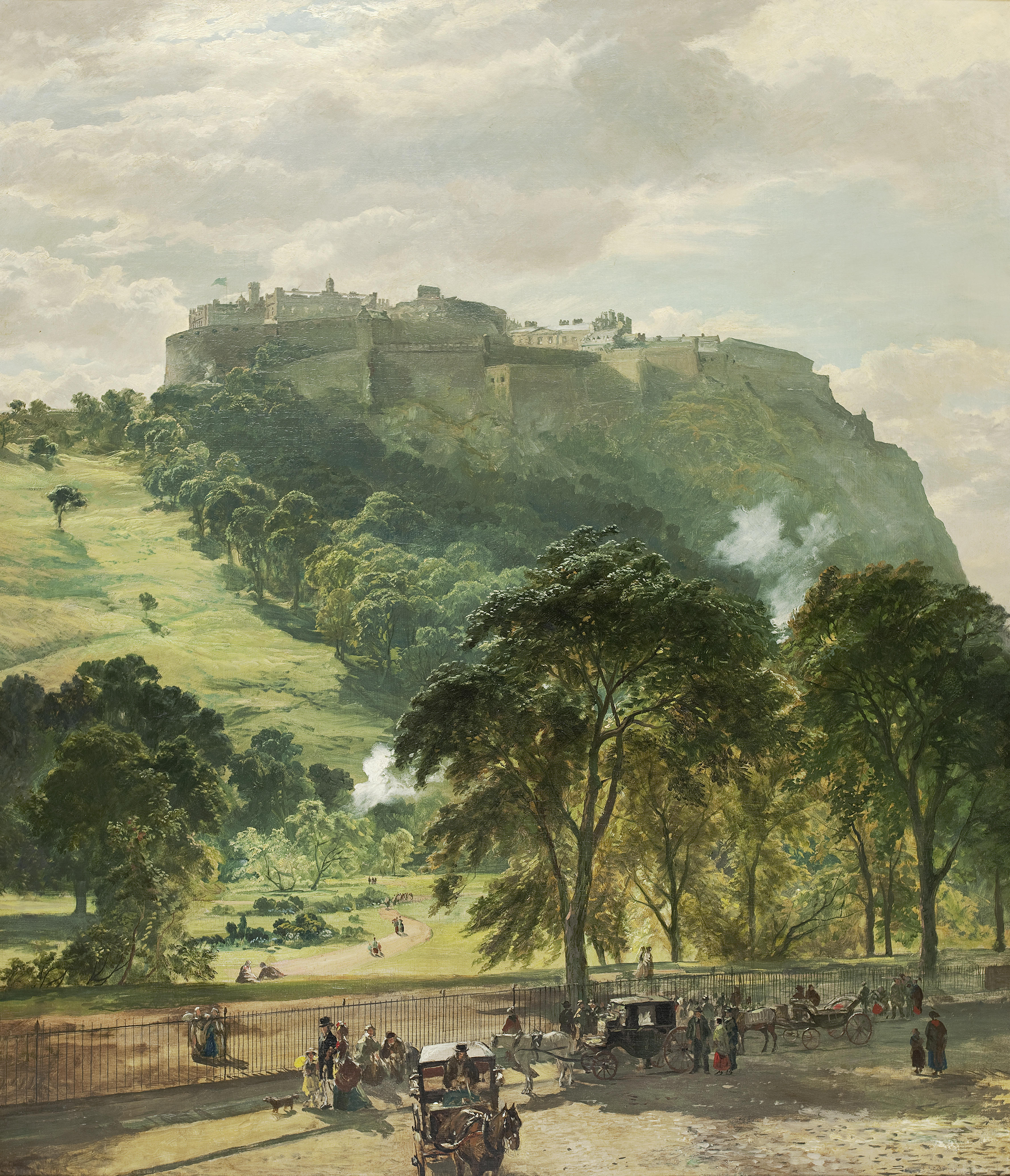
Wych elms, Samuel Bough, Edinburgh Castle from Princes Street, c.1878

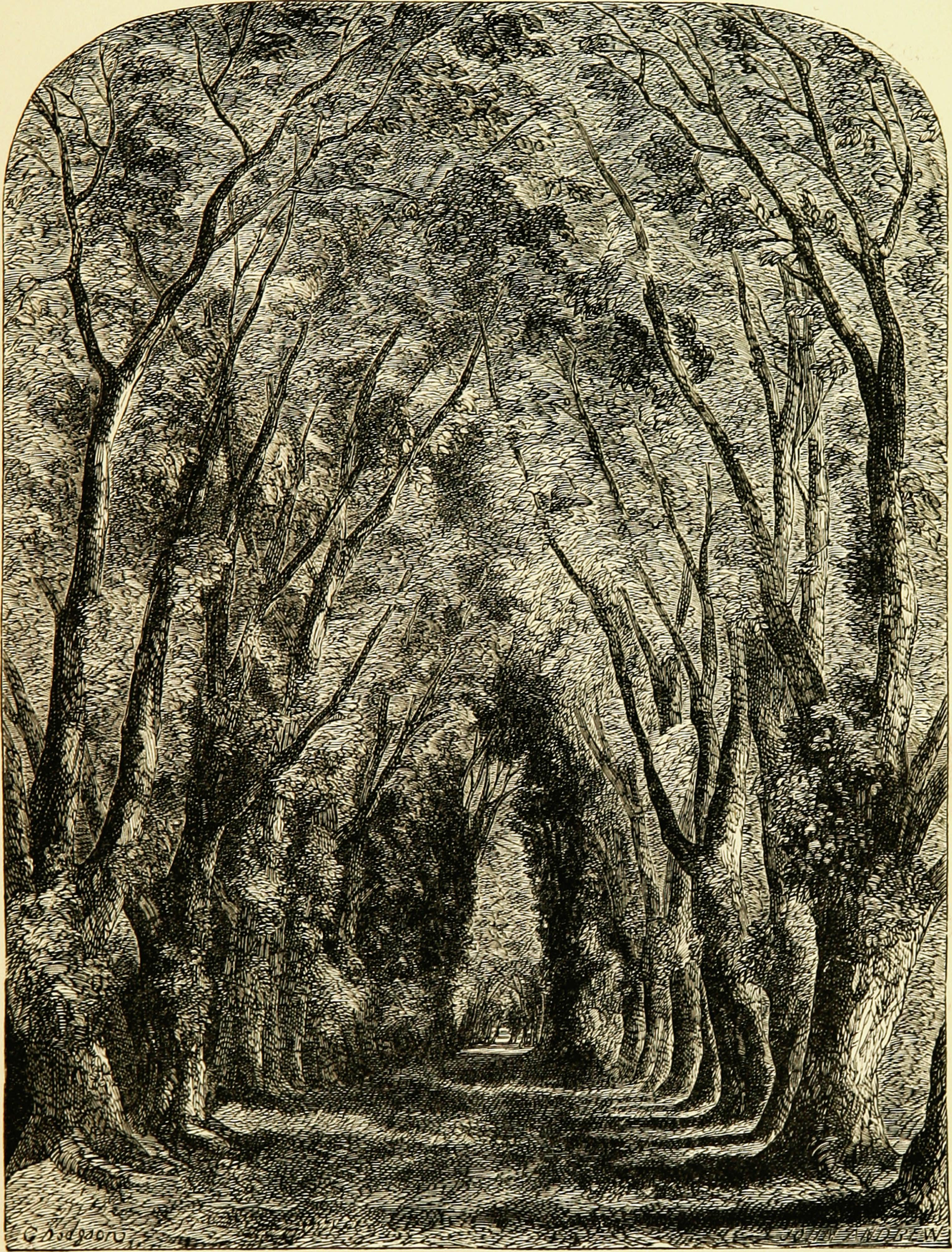
G. Dodgson, wych avenue, from The Poetical Works of Thomas Hood (1873)

== See also ==
- Who put Bella in the Wych Elm? – graffiti that appeared in 1944 following the discovery of the remains of a woman inside a wych elm in Worcestershire, England
