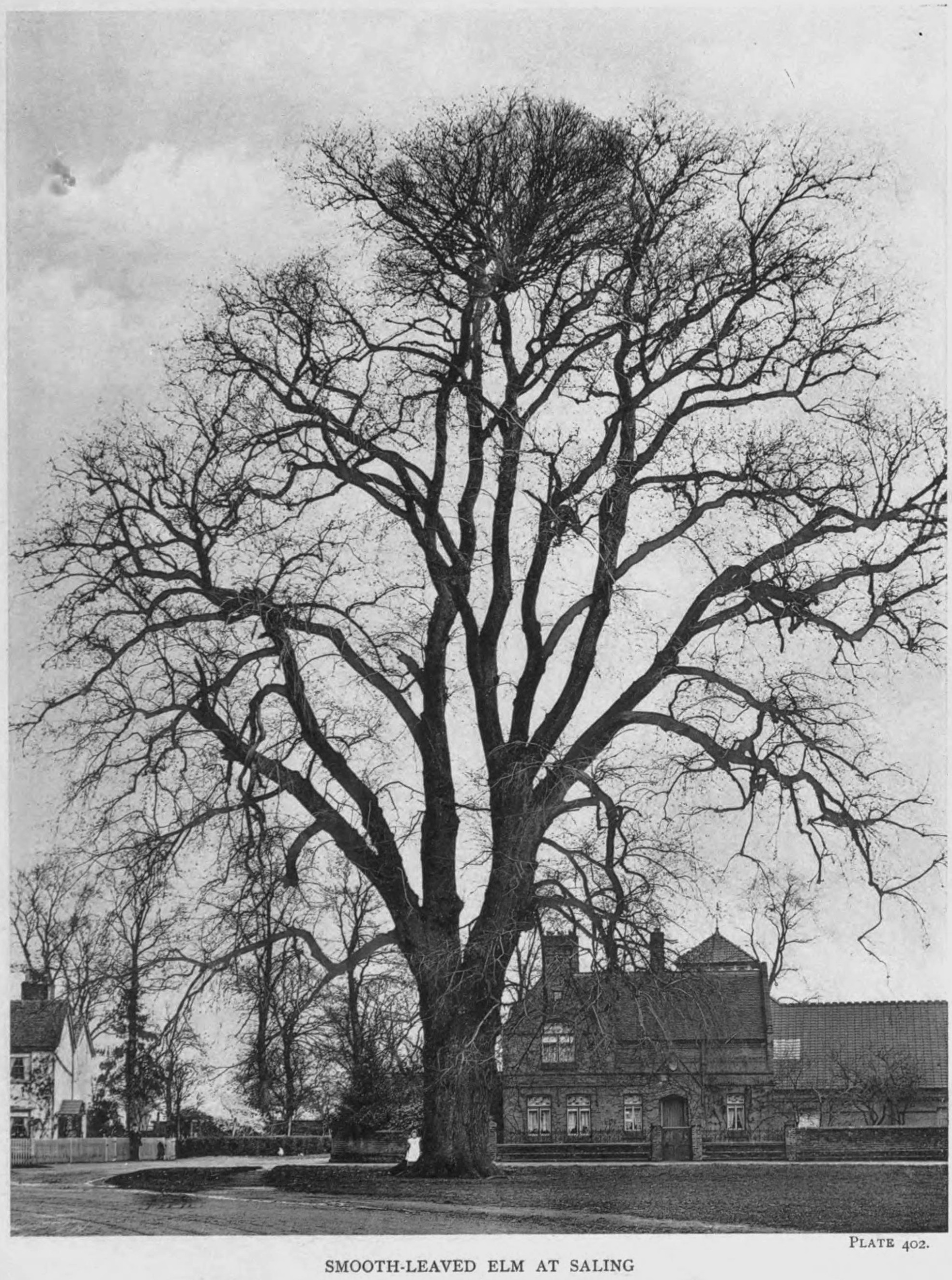
- The Great Saling elm (1906), identified by R. H. Richens as U. × hollandica (possibly older than the earliest named cultivar of this group in England, 'Dutch Elm')

Scientific classification
- Kingdom: Plantae
- Clade: Tracheophytes
- Clade: Angiosperms
- Clade: Eudicots
- Clade: Rosids
- Order: Rosales
- Family: Ulmaceae
- Genus: Ulmus
- Species: U. × hollandica

Binomial name
- Ulmus × hollandica Mill.

= Ulmus × hollandica =

Dutch elm

Ulmus × hollandica Mill. , often known simply as Dutch elm, is a natural hybrid between wych elm (U. glabra) and field elm (U. minor) which commonly occurs across Europe wherever the ranges of the parent species overlap. In England, according to the field-studies of R. H. Richens, "The largest area [of hybridization] is a band extending across Essex from the Hertfordshire border to southern Suffolk. The next largest is in northern Bedfordshire and adjoining parts of Northamptonshire. Comparable zones occur in Picardy and Cotentin in northern France". Crosses between U. × hollandica and either of the parent species are also classified as U. × hollandica.

The botanical name hollandica was first used for an elm variety by Plukenet in 1697 in describing a cultivar of this group now called 'Major'. Elms exported from the Netherlands to Germany in 1634 as 'Dutch elms' may have been 'Major'.

== Description ==
In form and foliage, the trees are broadly intermediate between the two species. F1 hybrids between wych and field elm are fully fertile, but produce widely variant progeny. Many also inherit the suckering habit of their field elm parent. Both Richens and Rackham noted that examples in the East Anglian hybridization zone were sometimes pendulous in form. In 1948 Melville described the experience of researching near the Hertfordshire-Essex border: "Groups of related hybrids occupy some of the valleys, forming distinct local races. Often, on passing over the brow of a hill from one valley to the next the elm population changes."

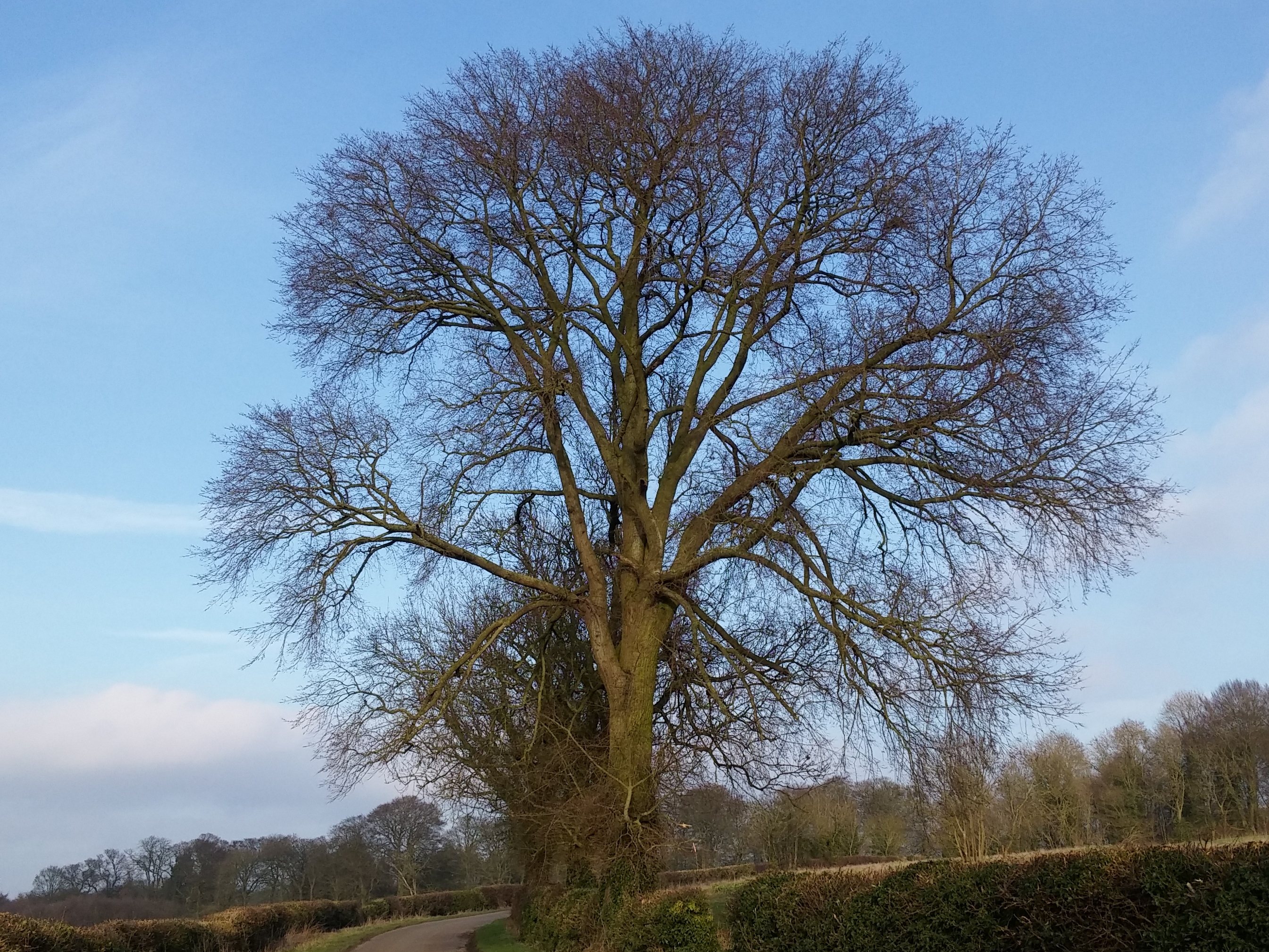
Ulmus × hollandica in Lincolnshire hedgerow

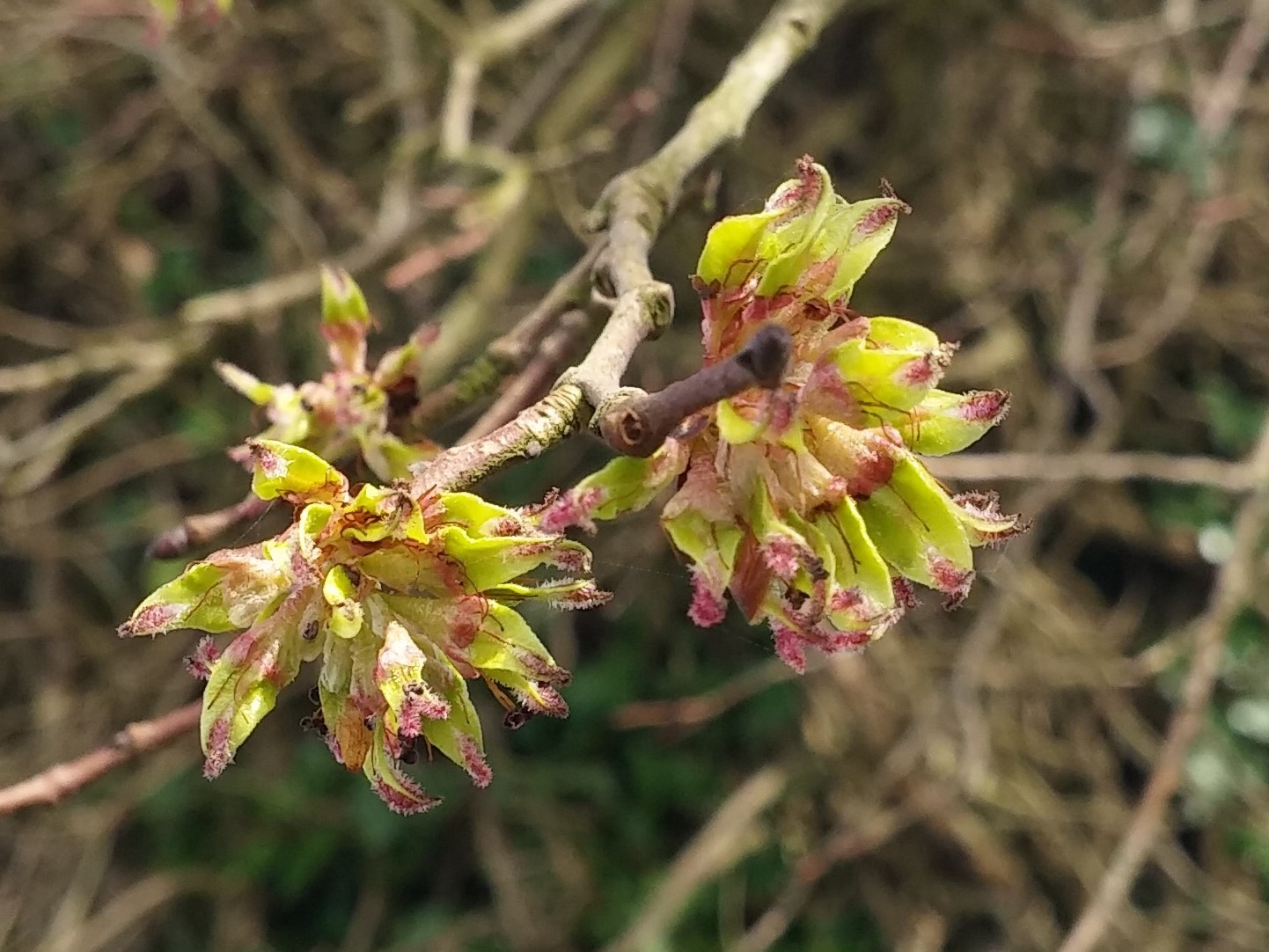
Nascent samarae of same

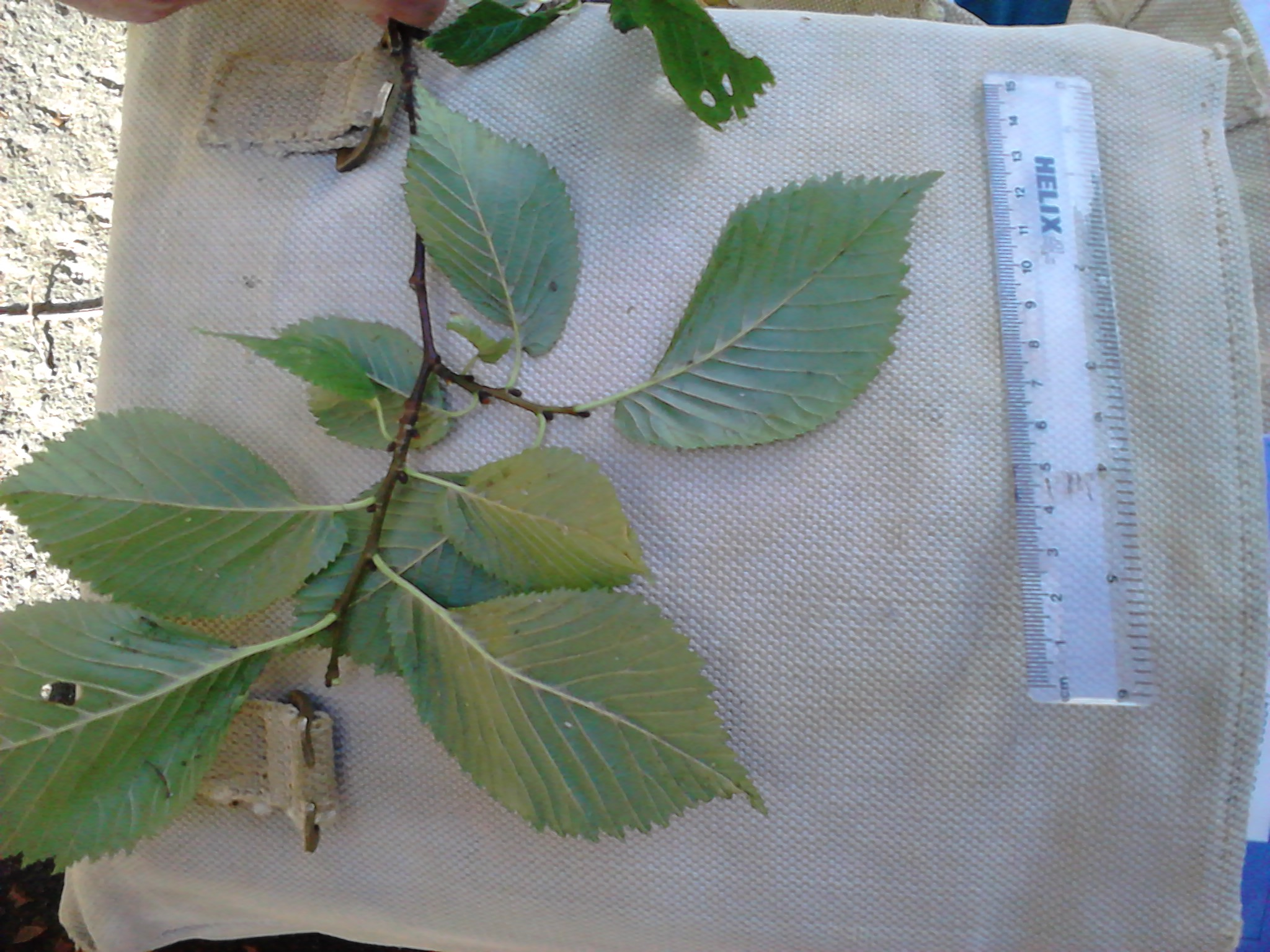
Ulmus × hollandica leaves, Edinburgh, showing intermediate features (longer petiole than wych, more tapering tip than field elm)

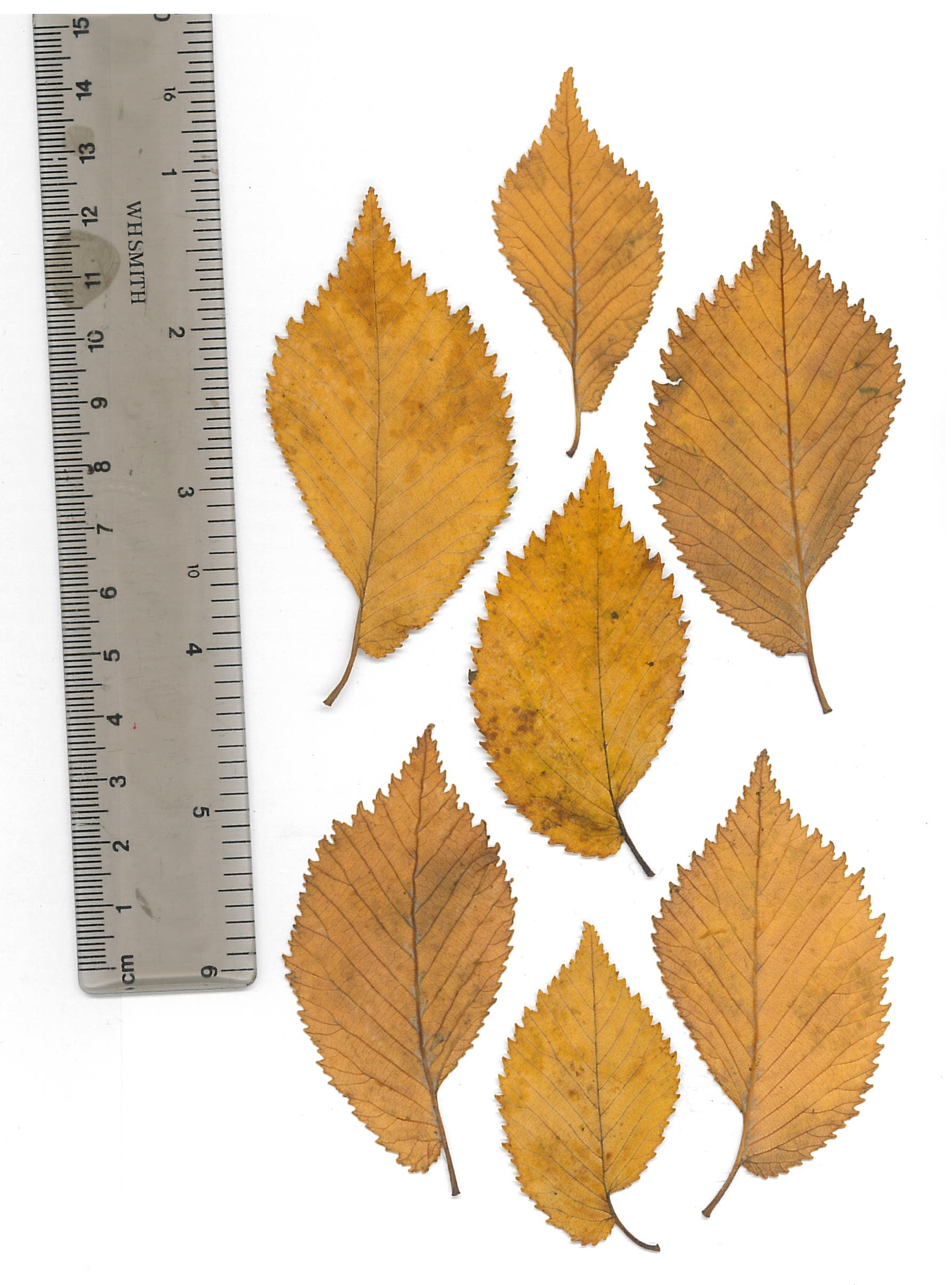
Pressed leaves of same tree

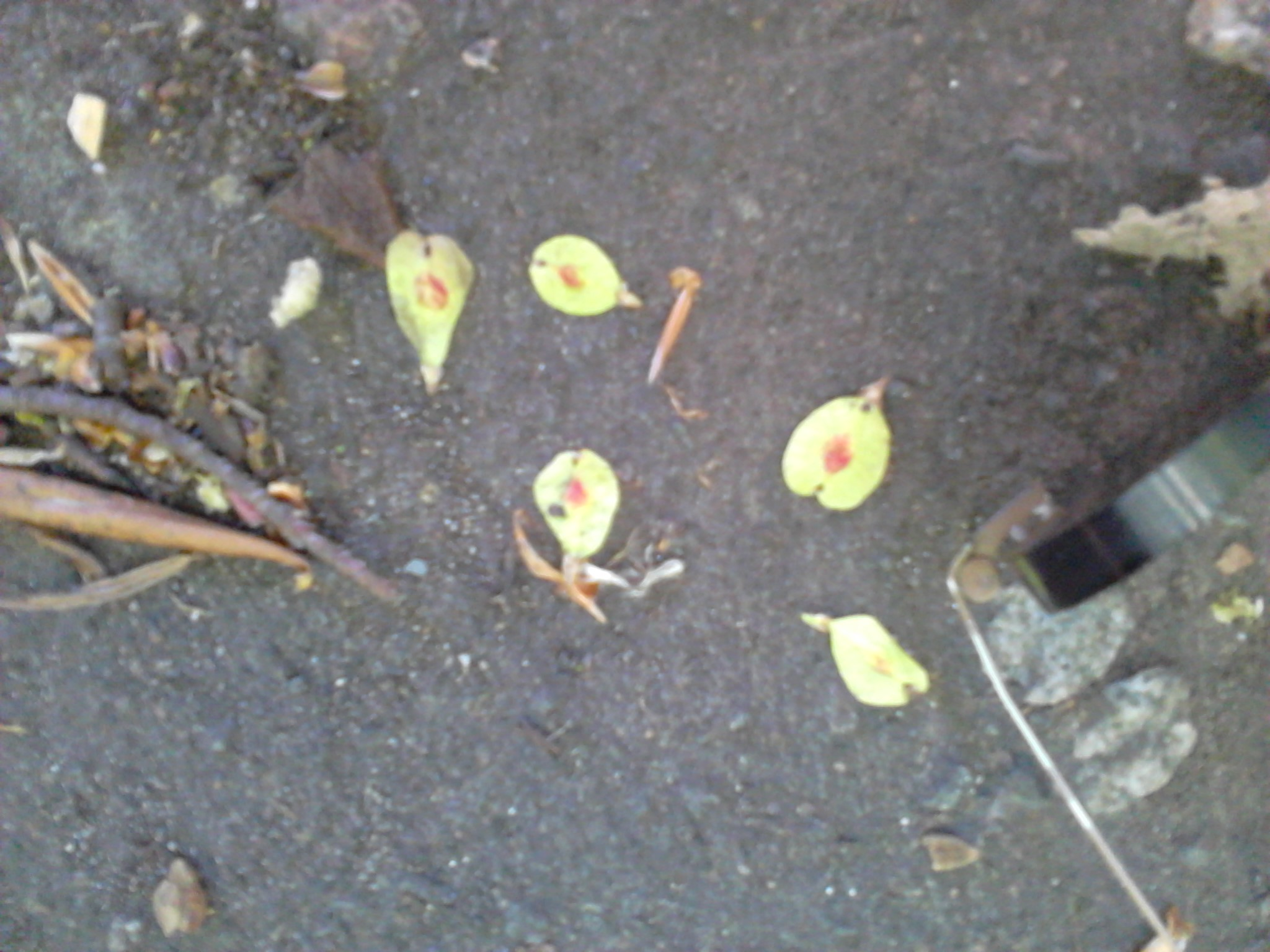
Variable fruit of same tree

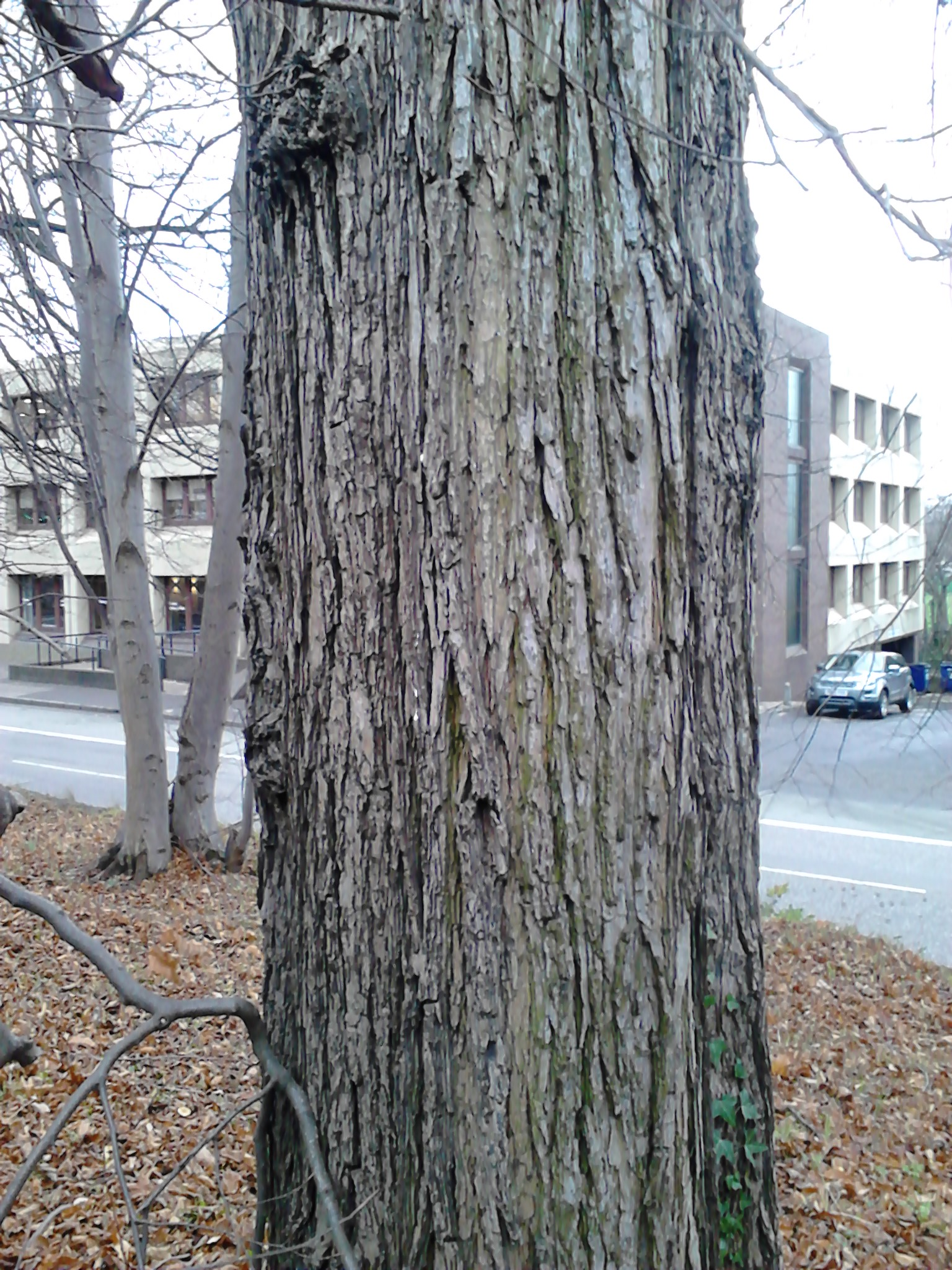
Bark of same

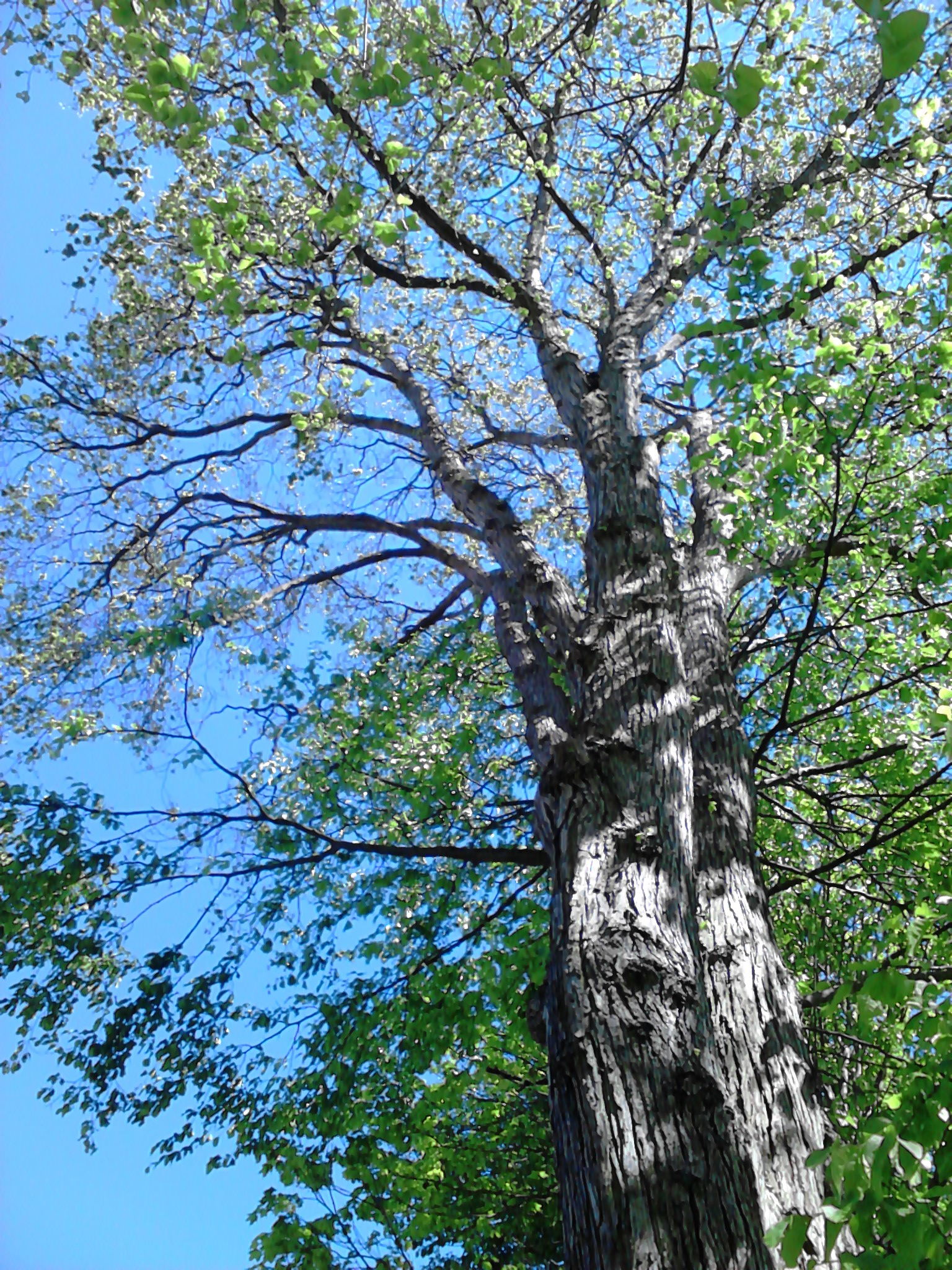
Branching of same

== Pests and diseases ==
Some examples of the hybrid possess a moderate resistance to Dutch elm disease.

== Cultivation ==
Ulmus × hollandica hybrids, natural and artificial, have been widely planted outside their zones of origin. Within their zones of origin they were often the tree of choice for lining streets, roads, canals and dykes, as in Flanders and the Low Countries.

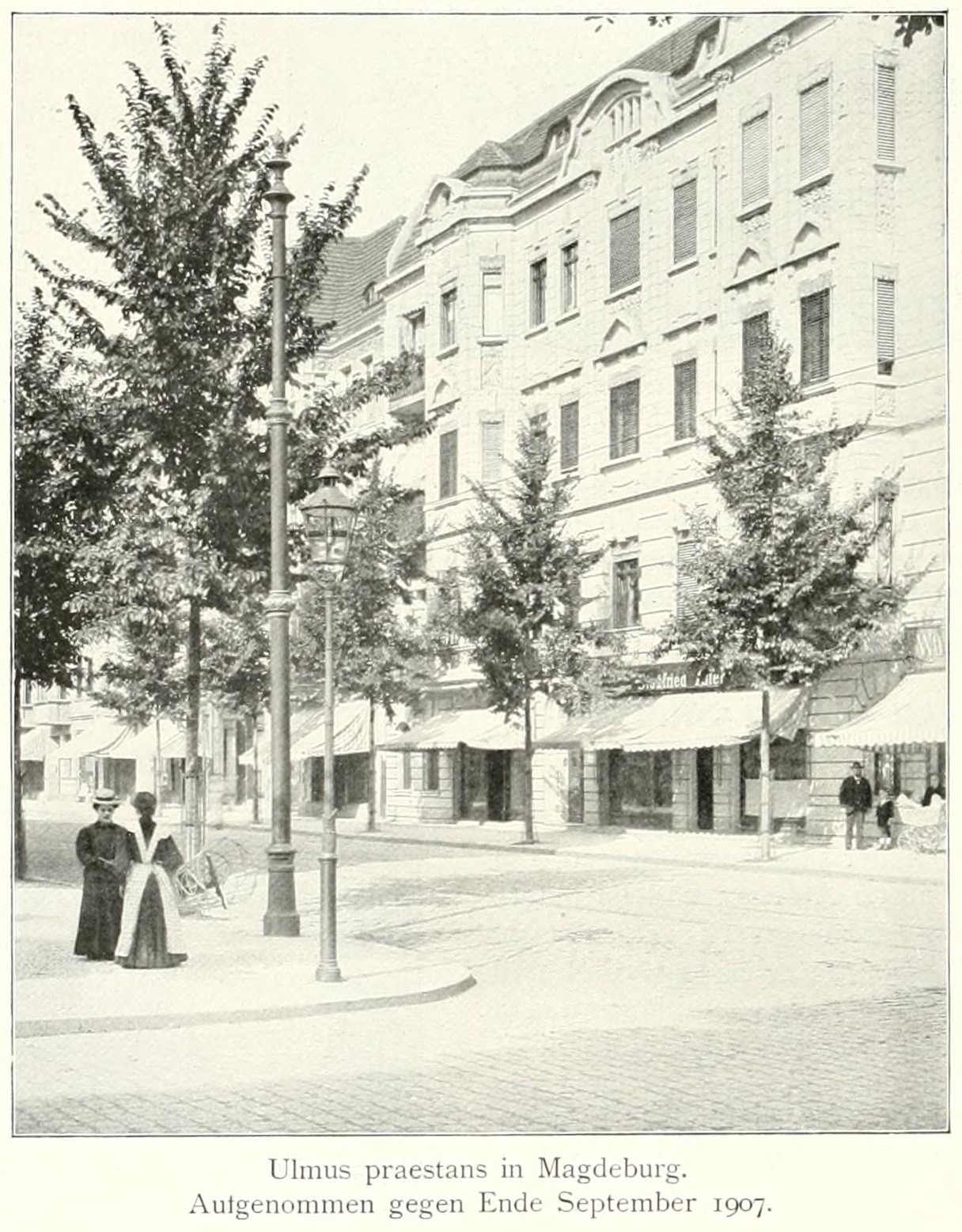
Ulmus × hollandica as a street tree: the cultivar 'Superba' ['Praestans'], Magdeburg, Germany (1907)

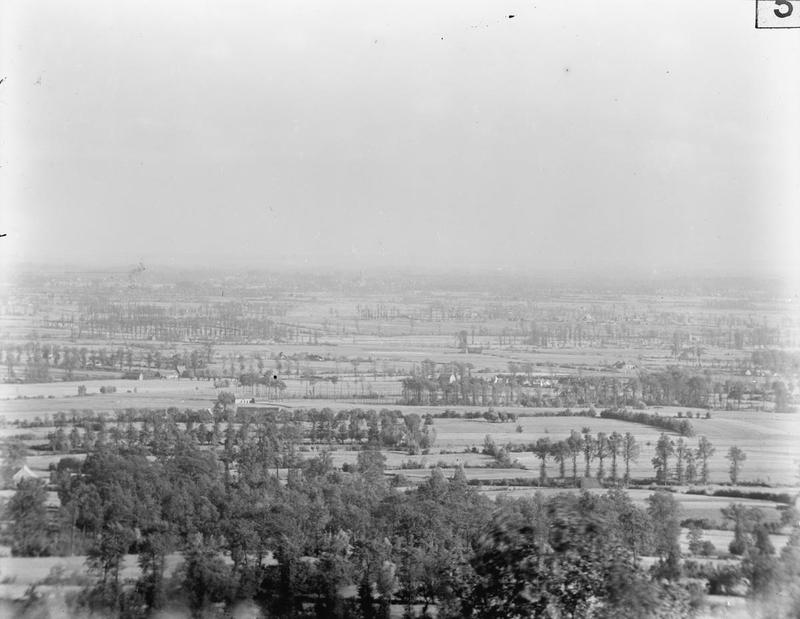
Lines of the fast-growing, narrow U. × hollandica cultivars 'Klemmer' and 'Dumont' were common in Flanders in the early 20th century (Bailleul, c.1915)

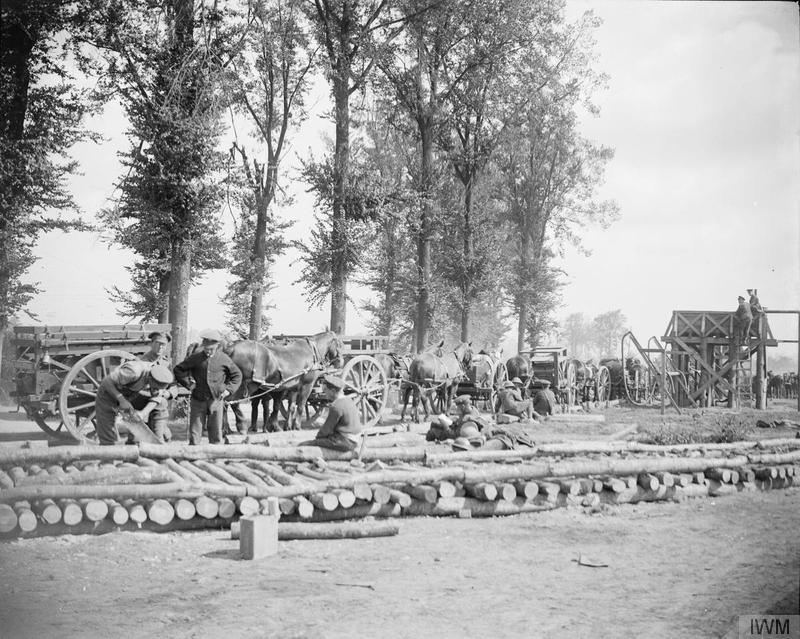
Logging among hybrid elms, near Dickebusche, south-west of Ypres (1917)

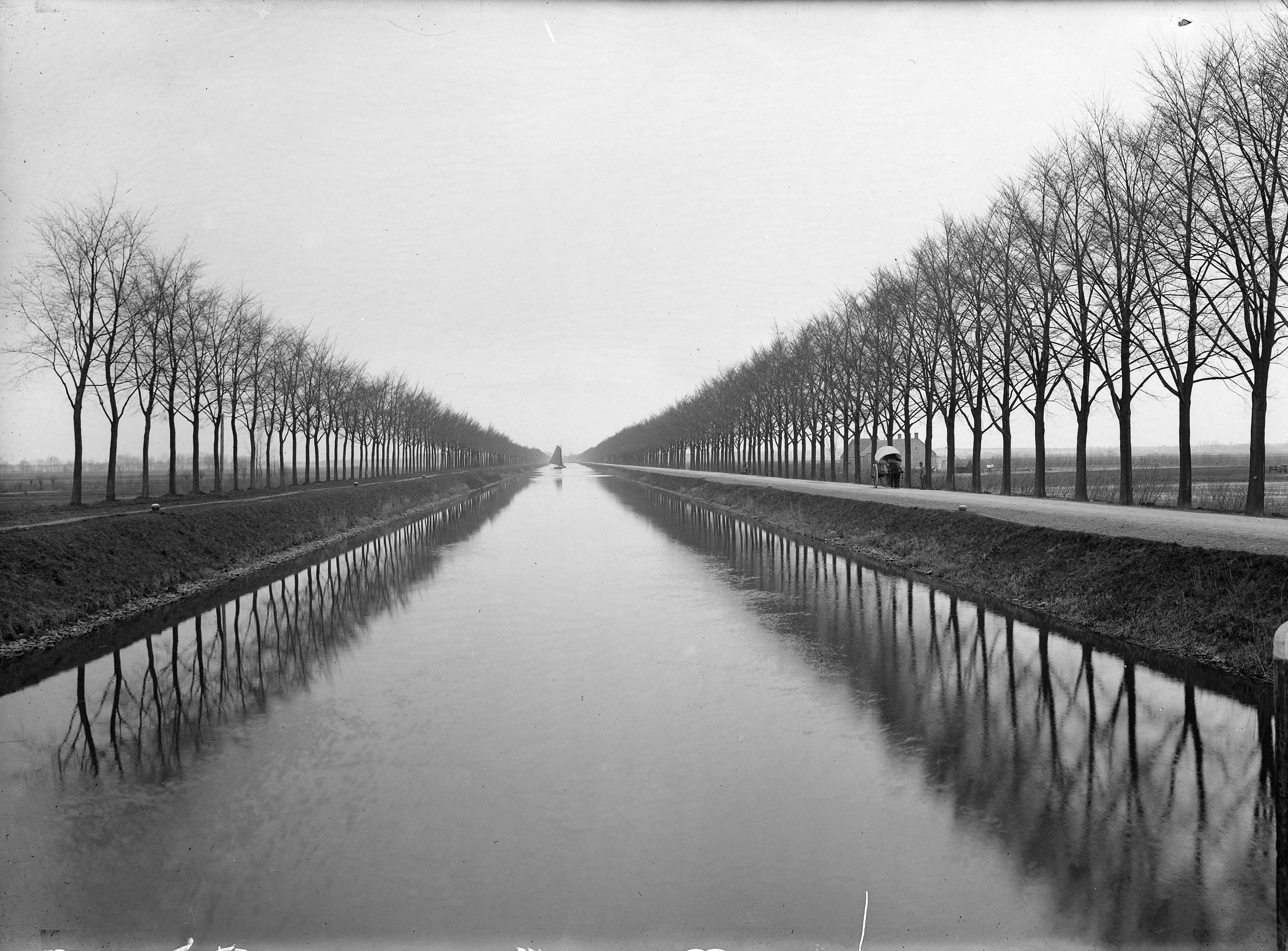
'Vegeta' as a canal tree, Zuid-Willemsvaart, the Netherlands (mid 20th century)

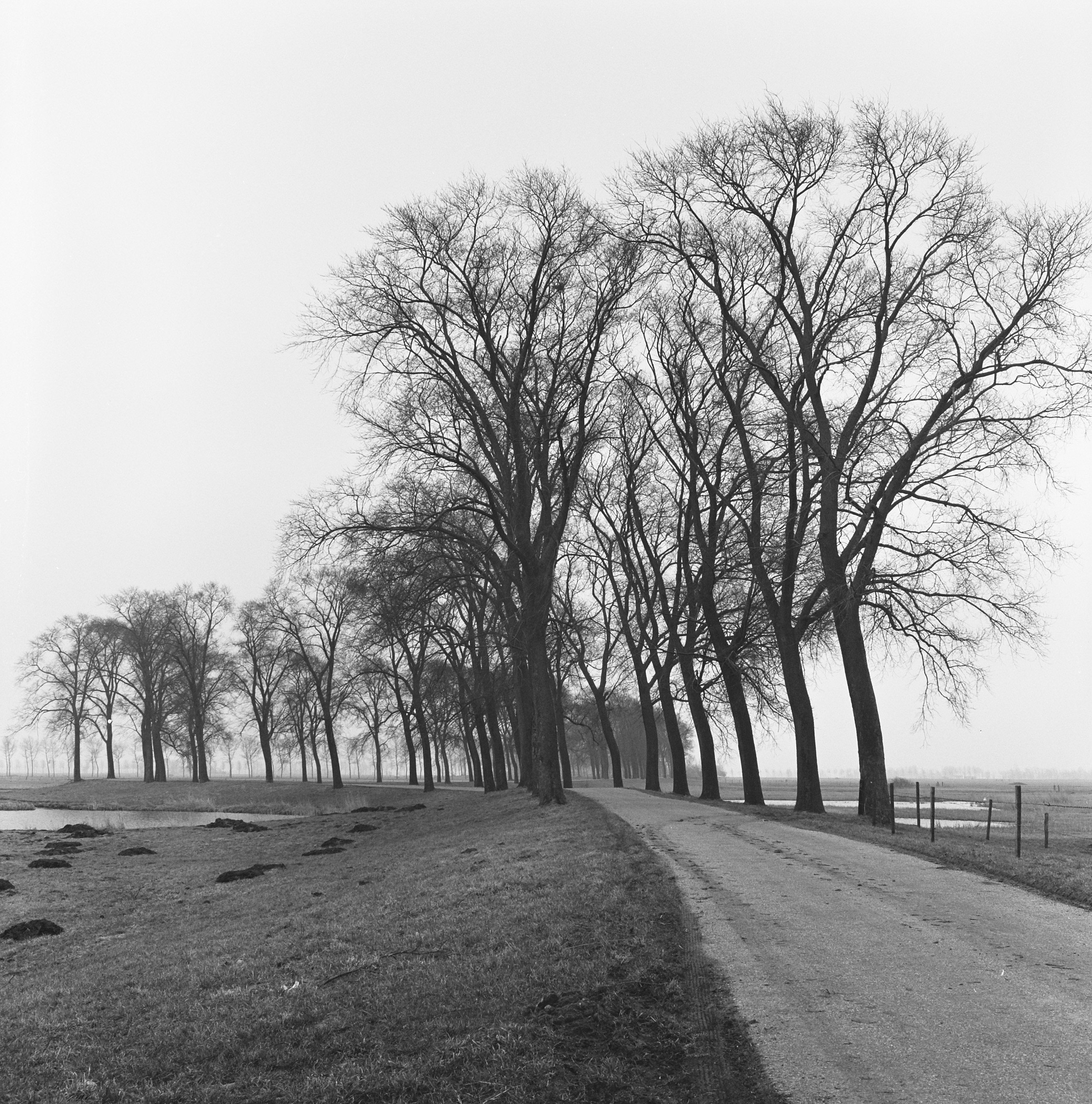
'Belgica', Kampernieuwstad, the Netherlands, before the second, more virulent Dutch elm disease epidemic (1968)

The hybrid has been introduced to North America and Australasia.

=== "Lineage elms" ===
Oliver Rackham used the term "Lineage elms" for local homogeneous Ulmus × hollandica hybrids, not nursery-sourced, that had arisen naturally in patches of woodland in the hybridization zone (mainly north Essex and south Suffolk) and had been cultivated within a small area, such as a village or parish, down the generations, for coppicing. They were said to coppice as well as wych, and to be non-invasive (non- or weakly-suckering). In his early publications he had referred to them as "the unnamed coppice elms of some eastern woods". Discussing them in detail in his Ancient Woodland (1980), he illustrated twenty and settled on the name "Lineage elms", with reference to Lineage Wood near Long Melford, Suffolk, one of his study-areas. For public access he gave as an example the elms of Groton Wood, Suffolk.

Old non-invasive Ulmus × hollandica in Sturt Copse, Oxfordshire (2016)

Same

== Notable trees ==
The great elm in The Grove of Magdalen College, Oxford, photographed by Henry Taunt in 1900, long believed to be a wych elm before being identified by Elwes as a 'Vegeta'-type hybrid, was for a time the largest elm known in Britain before it was blown down in 1911. It measured 44 m tall, its trunk at breast height being 2.6 m in diameter, and comprised an estimated 81 cubic metres (2,900 ft^{3}) of timber, making it the largest tree of any kind in Britain and possibly the largest north of the Alps. However, as Elwes pointed out, its calculated age would place its planting in the late 17th or early 18th century, long before the introduction of the Huntingdon elm, making the tree in question more likely to be a Chichester elm. A second tree nearby, described by Elwes as "similar in habit and foliage" and 130 feet (40 m) tall by 23 feet (7.0 m) in girth in 1912, was confirmed by Nellie Bancroft in a Gardener's Chronicle article in 1934 as a 'Vegeta'-type hybrid; it was propagated by Heybroek in 1958 and cultivated at the Baarn elm research institute as clone P41. (Note: Heybroek's clones P41 and P141, also from Magdalen College, were planted in a field trial in the Flevopolder in The Netherlands.) The tree survived till the 1960s. Like the Queens' College Chichester elms in Cambridge, the Magdalen College trees were not observed to produce root suckers, though The Grove at Magdalen has long been a deer park, and any sucker growth is likely to have been cropped. The Oxford zoologist Robert Gunther attributed the larger tree's unusual size to the fact (discovered in 1926) that it had been growing on a phosphate-rich bone-bed, made up of the remains of mammoths and other prehistoric animals.

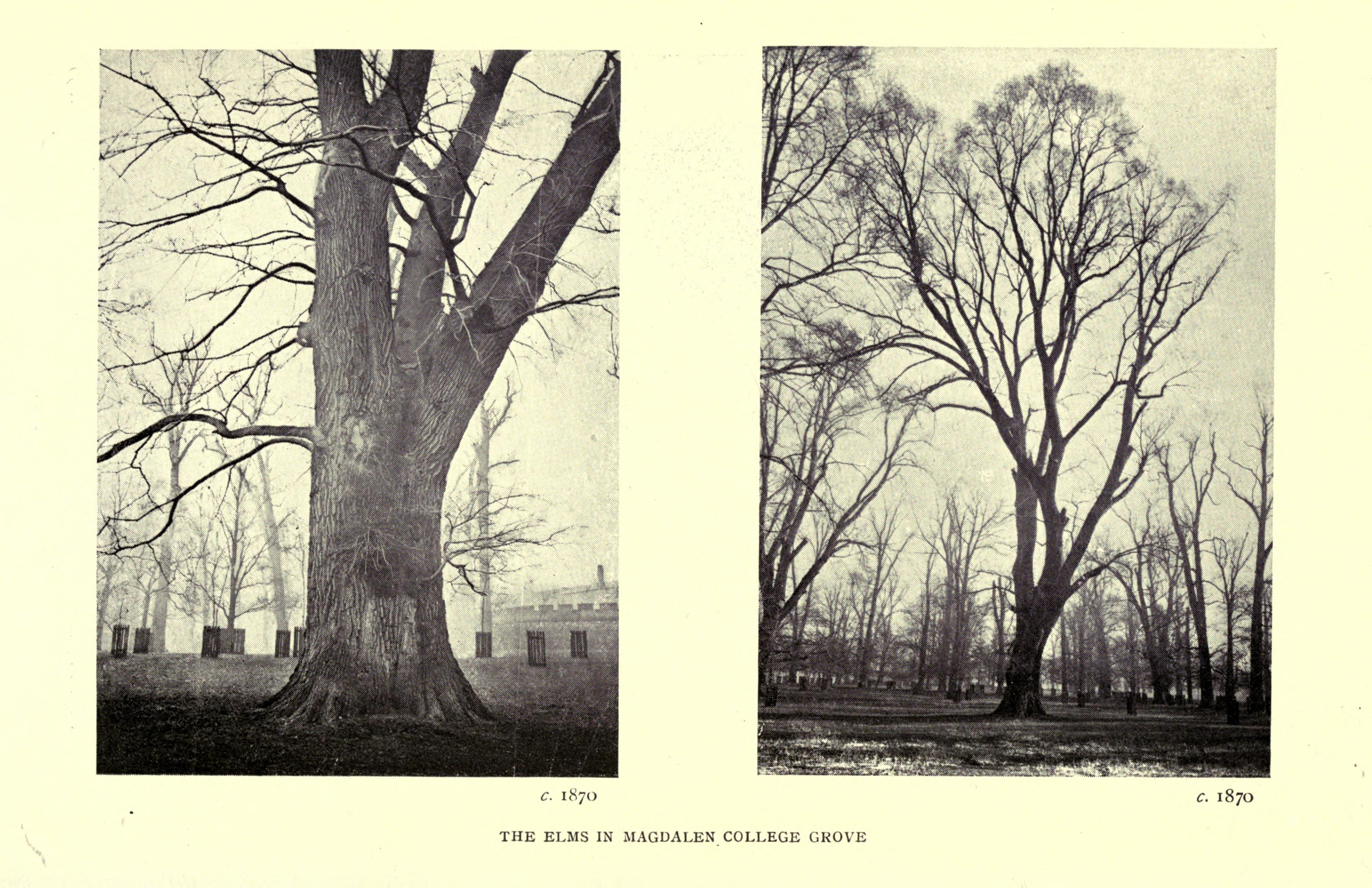
The great elm in The Grove, Magdalen College, Oxford (ca. 1870)

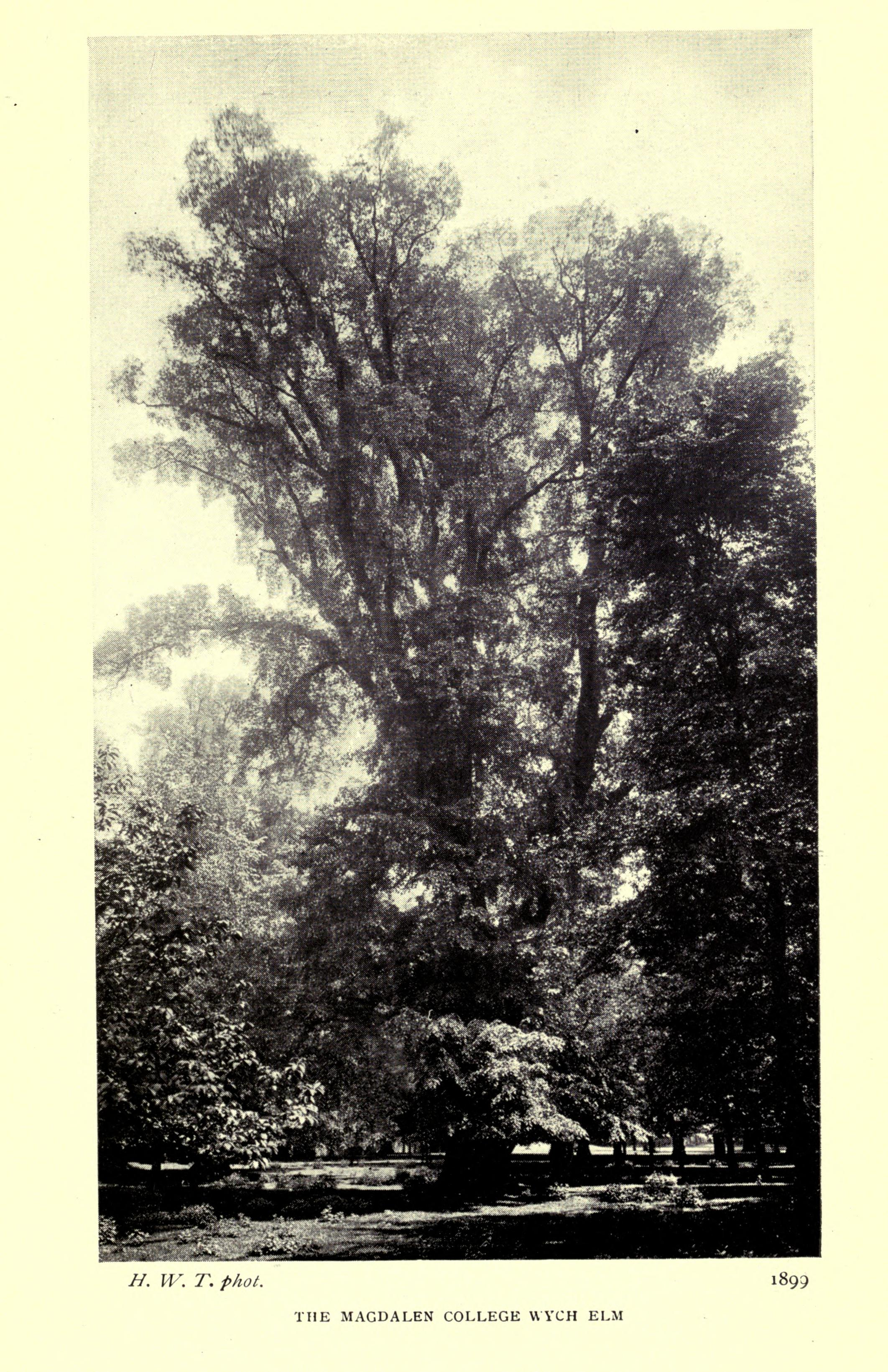
Magdalen College elm in leaf (1899)

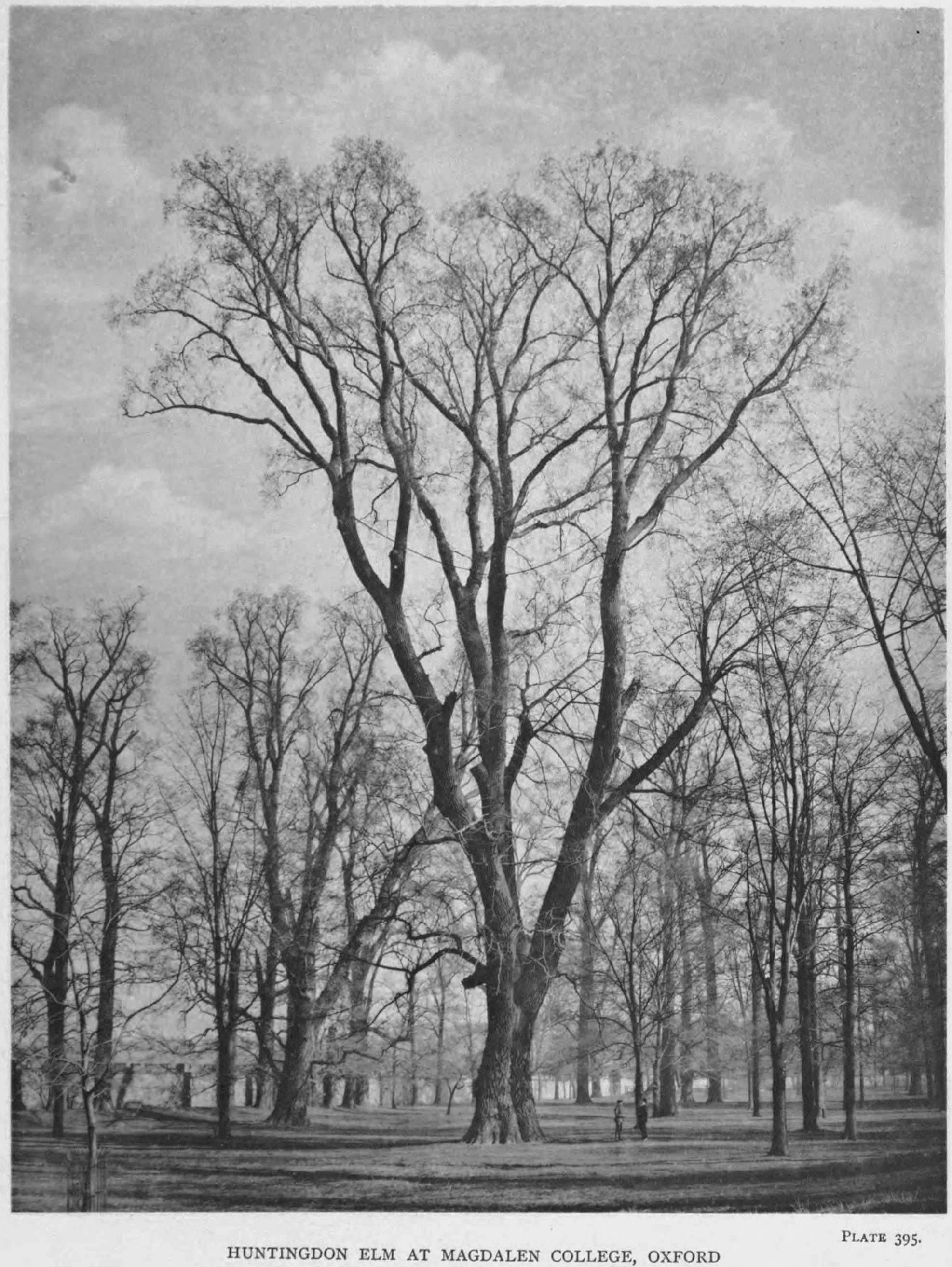
Magdalen College elm (1906)

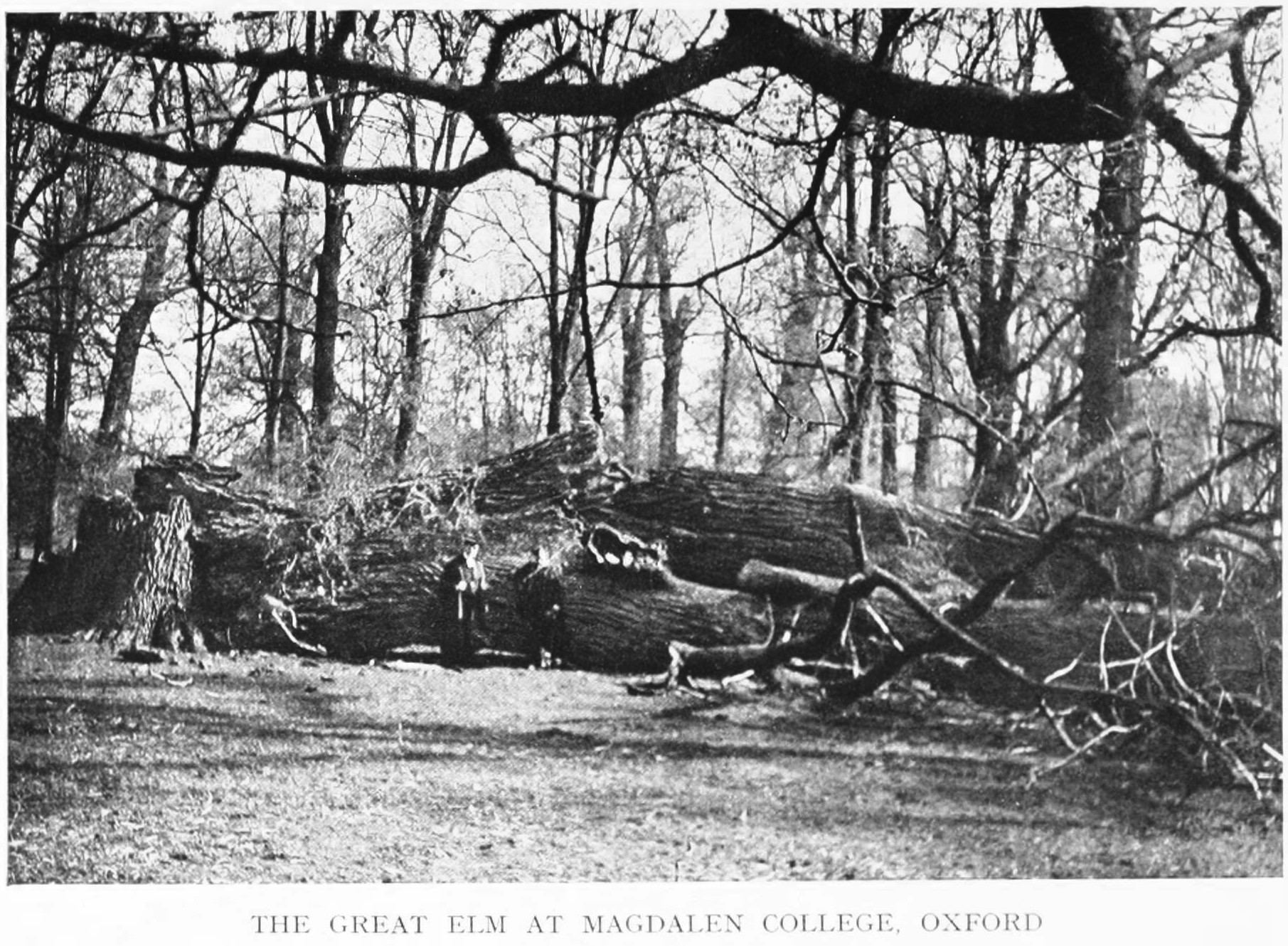
Magdalen College elm after being blown down (1911)

With a girth of 6.9 m (22.6 ft) and a height of 40 metres (130 ft), the Ulmus × hollandica hybrid elm on Great Saling Green, Great Saling, near Braintree, Essex, reckoned at least 350 years old, was reputedly the largest elm in England, before succumbing to Dutch Elm Disease in the 1980s; Elwes and Henry (1913) misidentified it as U. nitens (Ulmus minor).

Examples of mature survivors in the East Anglian hybridisation zone include those near Royston, Hertfordshire, designated 'Elm of the Year, 2004' by Das Ulmen Büro. An example of the weeping form survives at Actons Farm, Sawbridgeworth, Hertfordshire.

There are two notable TROBI Champion trees in the British Isles, one at Little Blakenham, Suffolk, measuring 160 centimetres (5.2 ft) d.b.h. in 2008, the other at Nounsley, Essex, 17 metres (56 ft) high by 150 centimetres (4.9 ft) d.b.h. in 2005.

A large old Ulmus × hollandica in Pioneer Park, Agassiz, British Columbia (2023, about 40 m tall, bole-girth 6 m), is believed to have been planted c.1870.

The so-called W. G. Grace Elm, a majestic spreading hybrid (labelled just "Dutch elm"), the last survivor (2009) of a ring of elms round East Oval, Ballarat, Victoria, was reputedly planted by W. G. Grace himself in 1874 during a tour by the England cricket team. It has been shown, however, to date from 1900. 'W. G. G.' had attained a spread round the middle of 31 m by 1982.

== Cultivars ==
At least 40 cultivars have been recorded, although some may not have survived Dutch elm disease:

- Ademuz
- Alba
- Angustifolia
- Balder
- Belgica
- Blandford
- Canadian Giant
- Cicestria
- Cinerea
- Commelin
- Dampieri
- Dauvessei
- Daveyi
- Dehesa de Amaniel
- Dovaei
- Dumont
- Elegantissima
- Eleganto-Variegata
- Etrusca
- Fastigiata
- Fjerrestad
- Folia Rhomboidea
- Freja
- Fulva
- Gaujardii
- Groeneveld
- Haarlemensis
- Klemmer
- Loke
- Macrophylla Aurea
- Majadahonda
- Major
- Microphylla
- Modiolina
- Muscaviensis
- Nottingham
- Odin
- Pioneer
- Pitteurs
- Serpentina
- Smithii
- Superba
- Tricolor
- Tyr
- Vegeta
- Viminalis
- Viscosa
- Wentworthii Pendula
- Wredei
- Ypreau

Others provisionally identified as Ulmus × hollandica include 'Scampstoniensis' and 'Virens' (by Green); 'Purpurea' and 'Louis van Houtte' (by F. J. Fontaine); 'Escaillard' and 'Hillieri' (by Buisman); 'Rugosa Pendula' (by Arnold and Morton arboreta); and Späth's 'Fastigiata Glabra' (by Melville). Cultivars at one time or another identified as U. × hollandica, but which may have suffered misidentification through confusion with U. glabra Huds. cultivars that share the same name include 'Fastigiata Glabra', 'Fastigiata Macrophylla', 'Latifolia', and 'Rugosa'. In the 19th century and early 20th, Ulmus × hollandica cultivars (as well as those of wych elm) were often grouped under Ulmus montana.

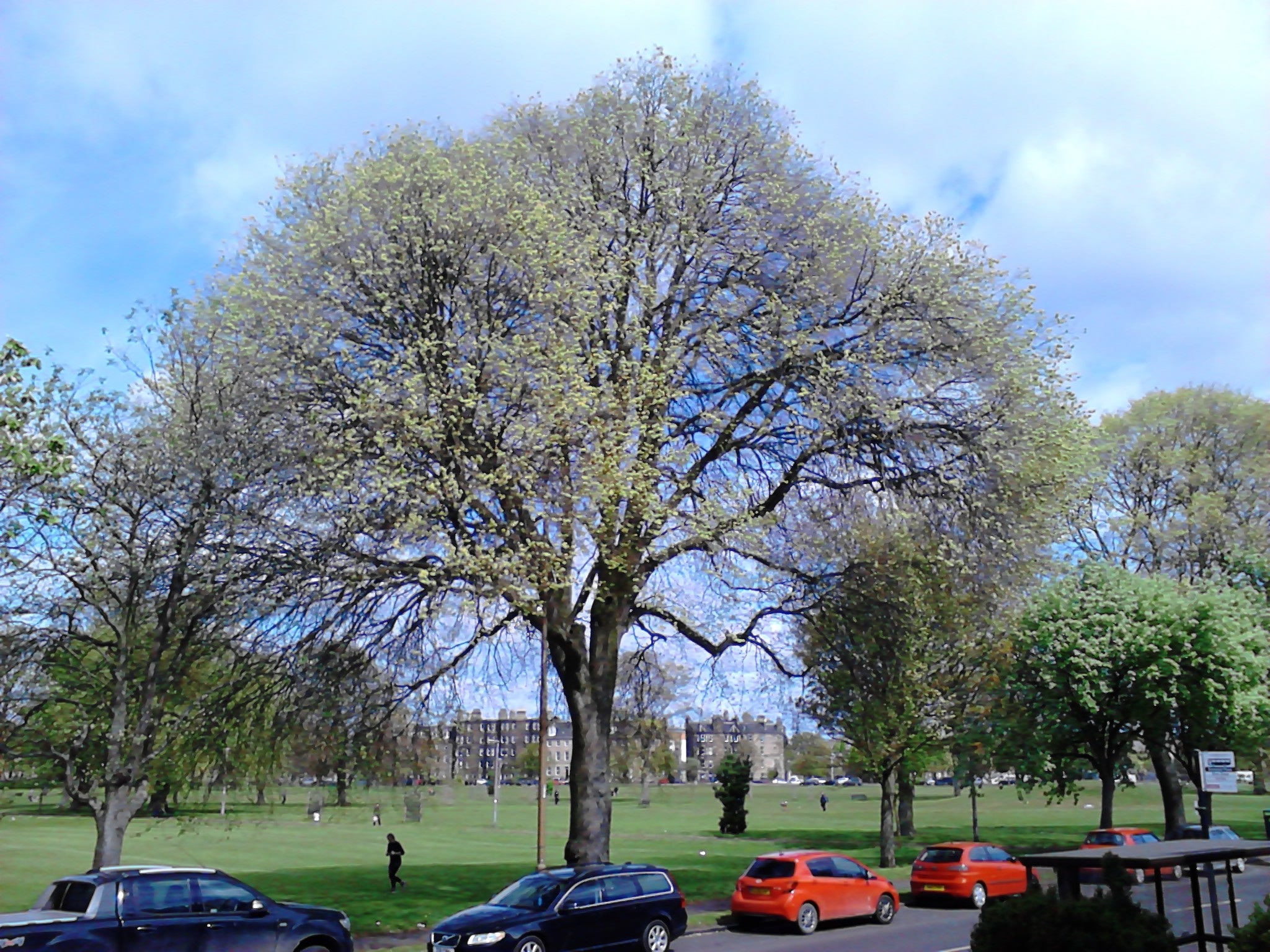
A planted U. × hollandica, perhaps a named cultivar, on Leith Links, Edinburgh (fruiting, April 2017)

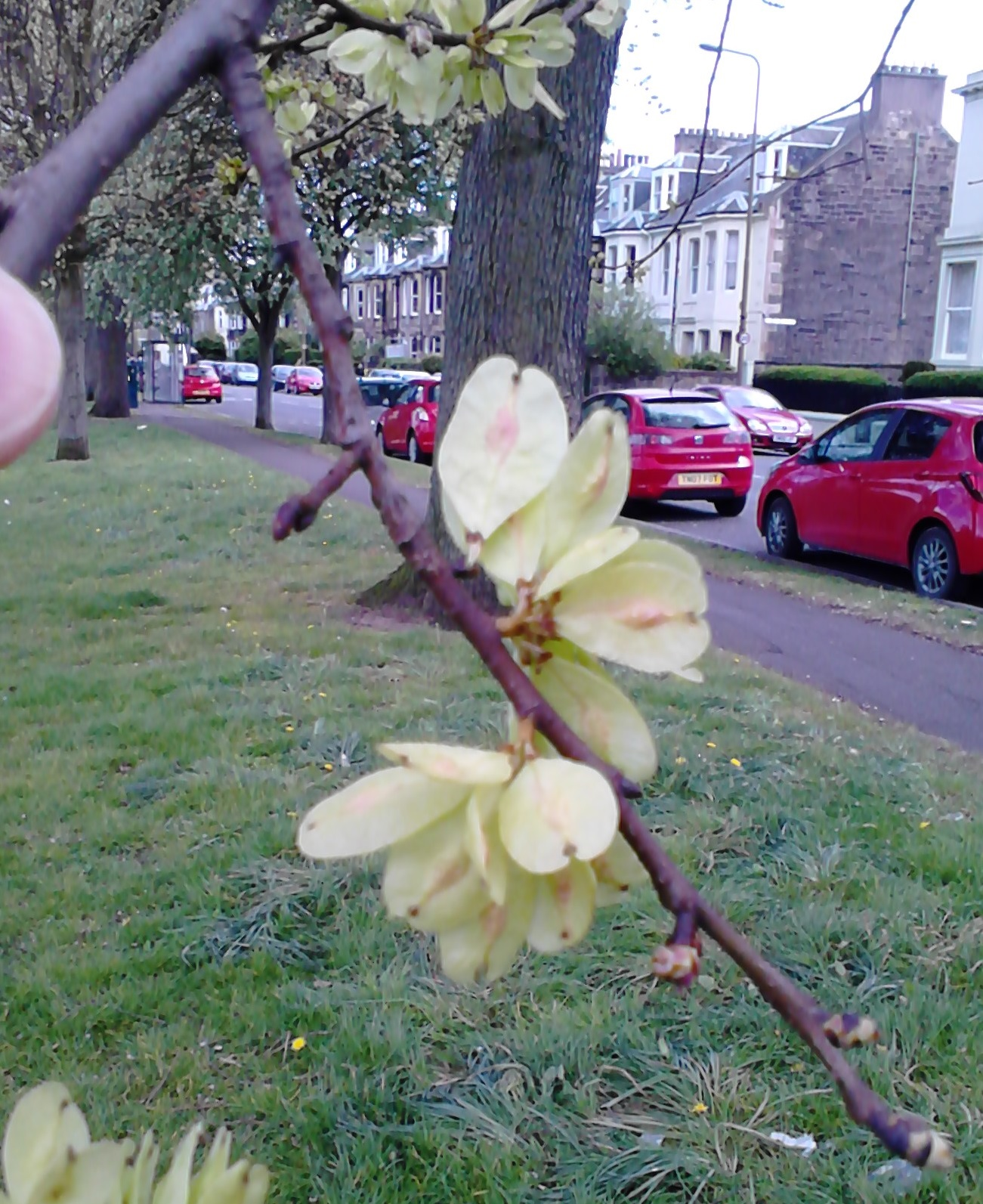
Samarae

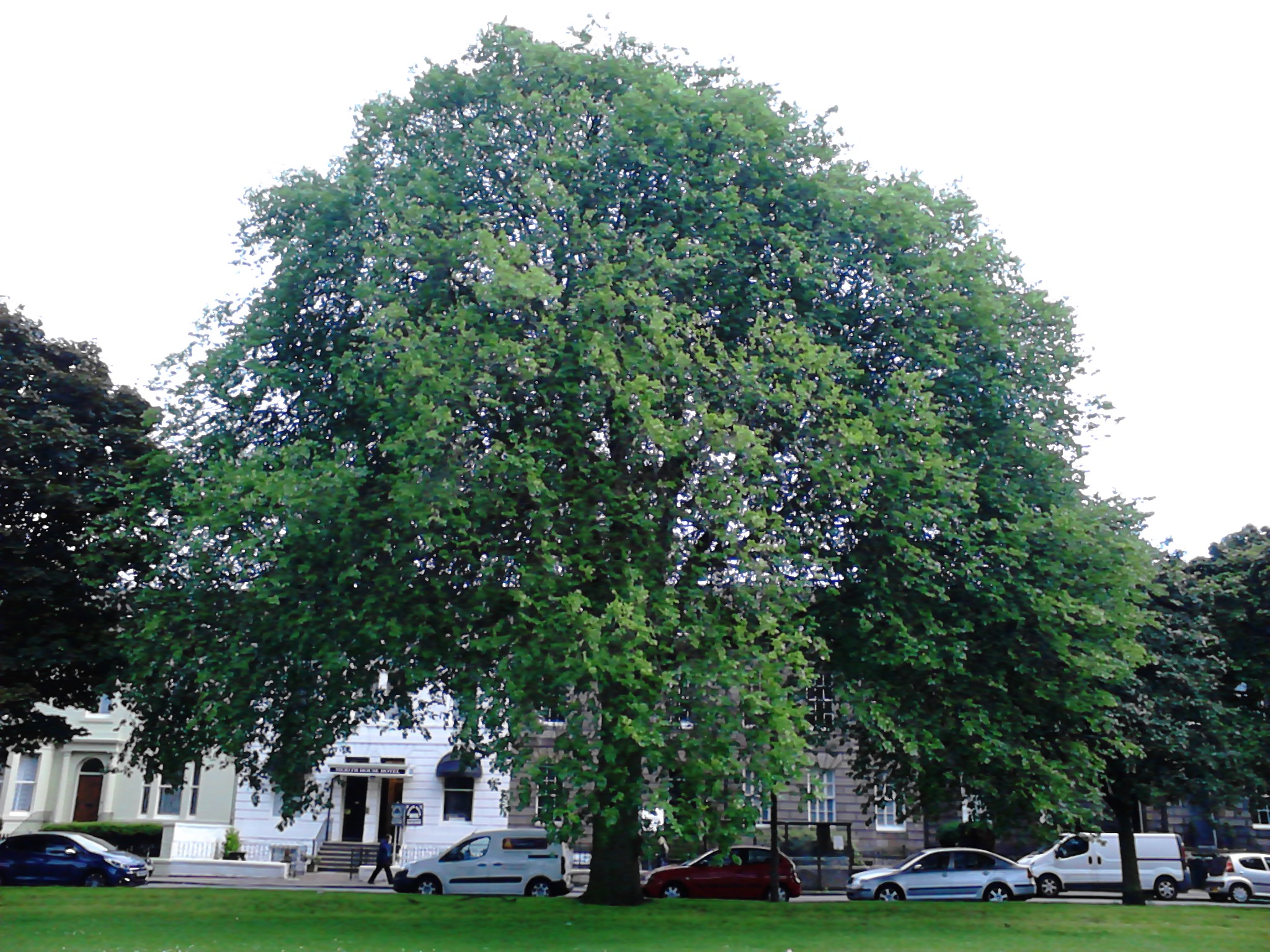
July

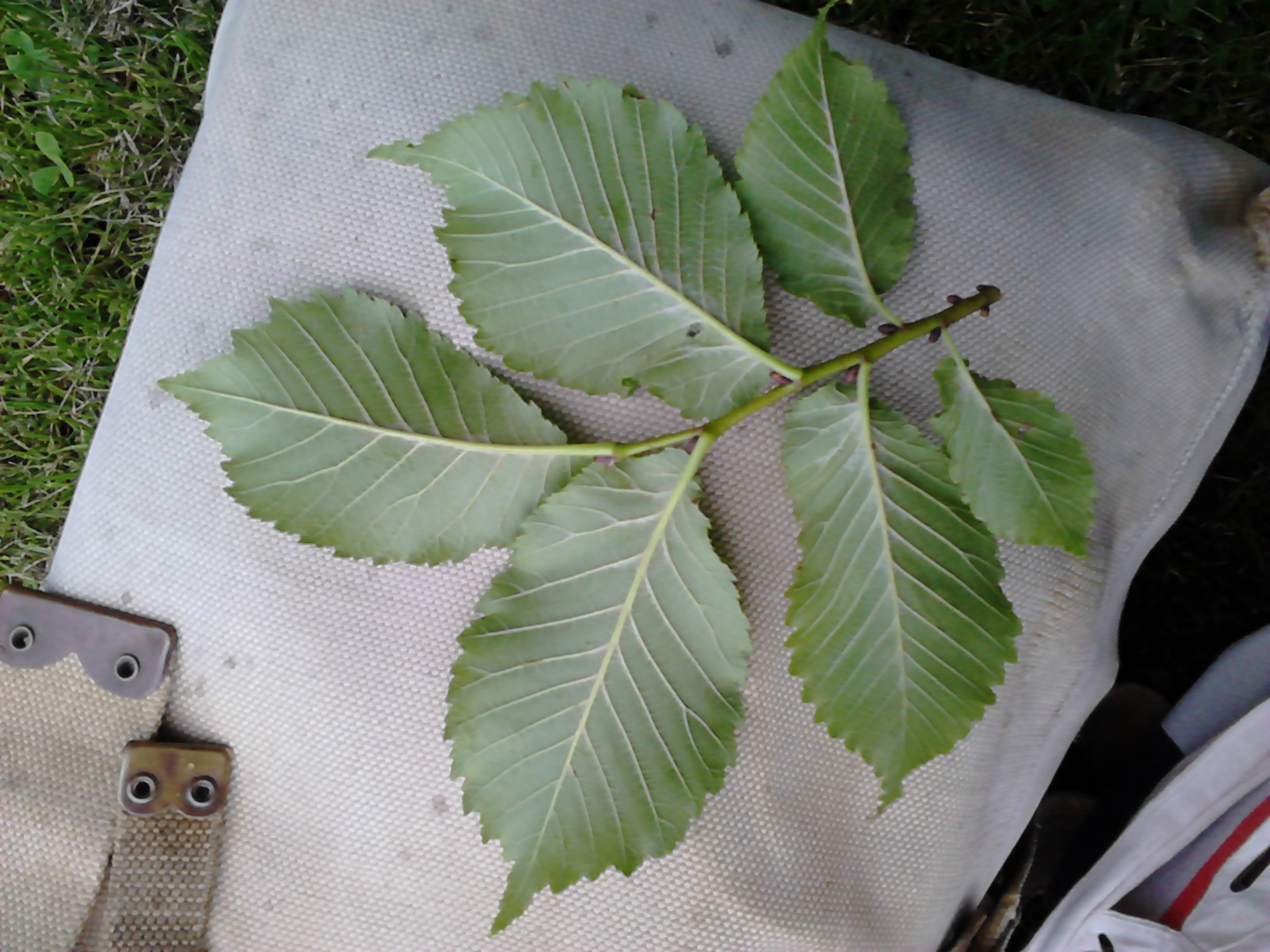
Short shoot undersides

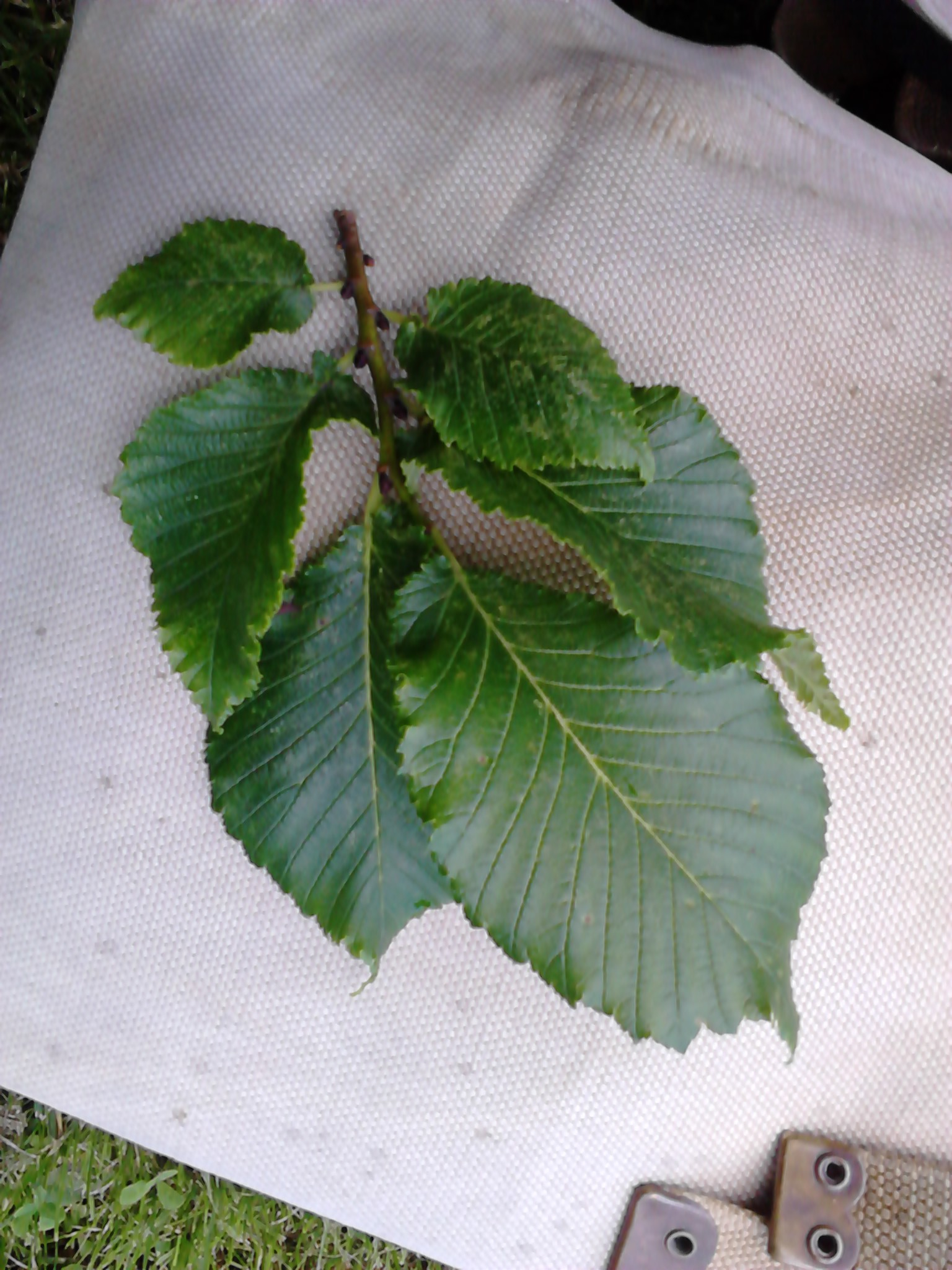
Short shoot

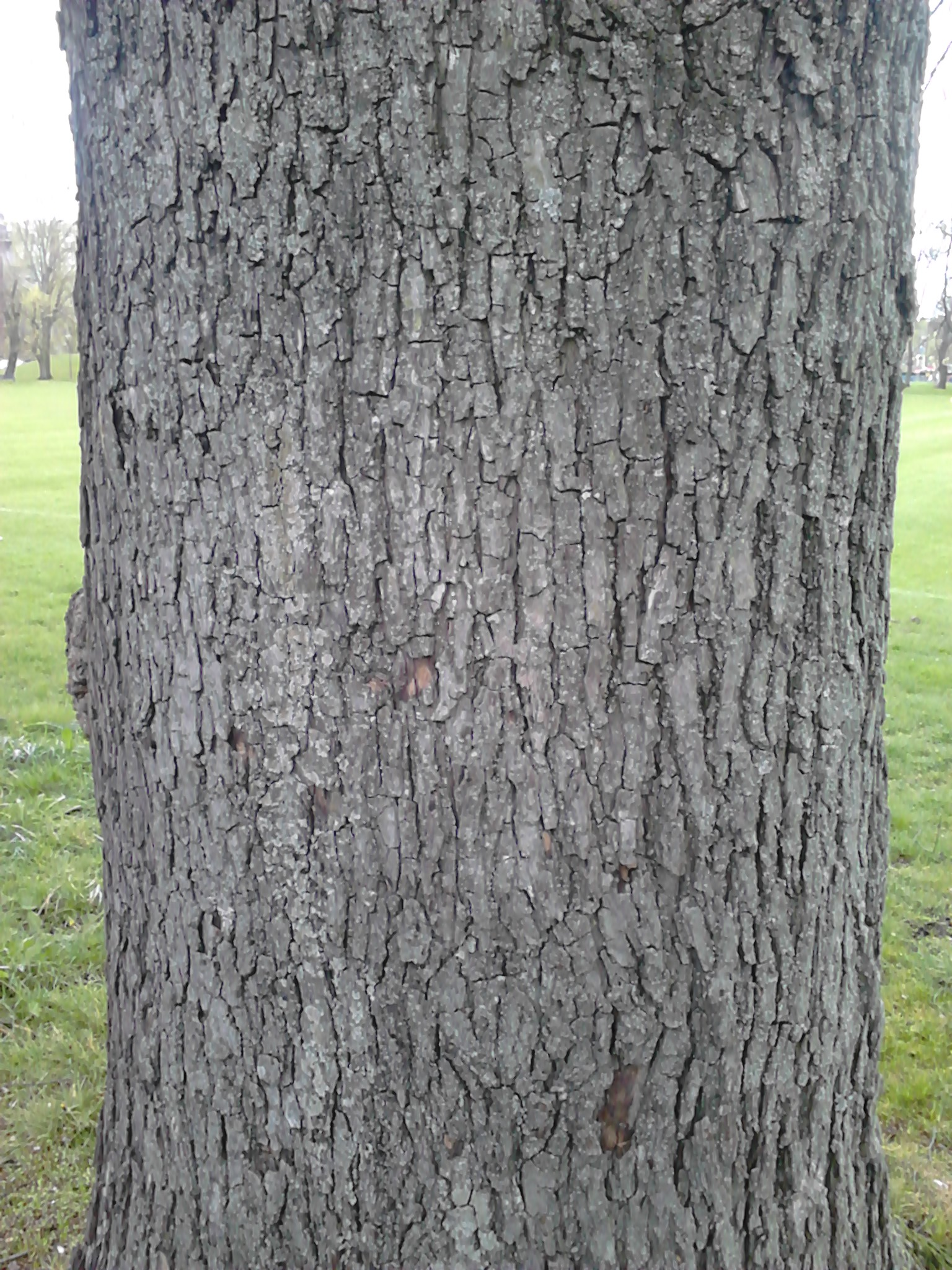
Bark
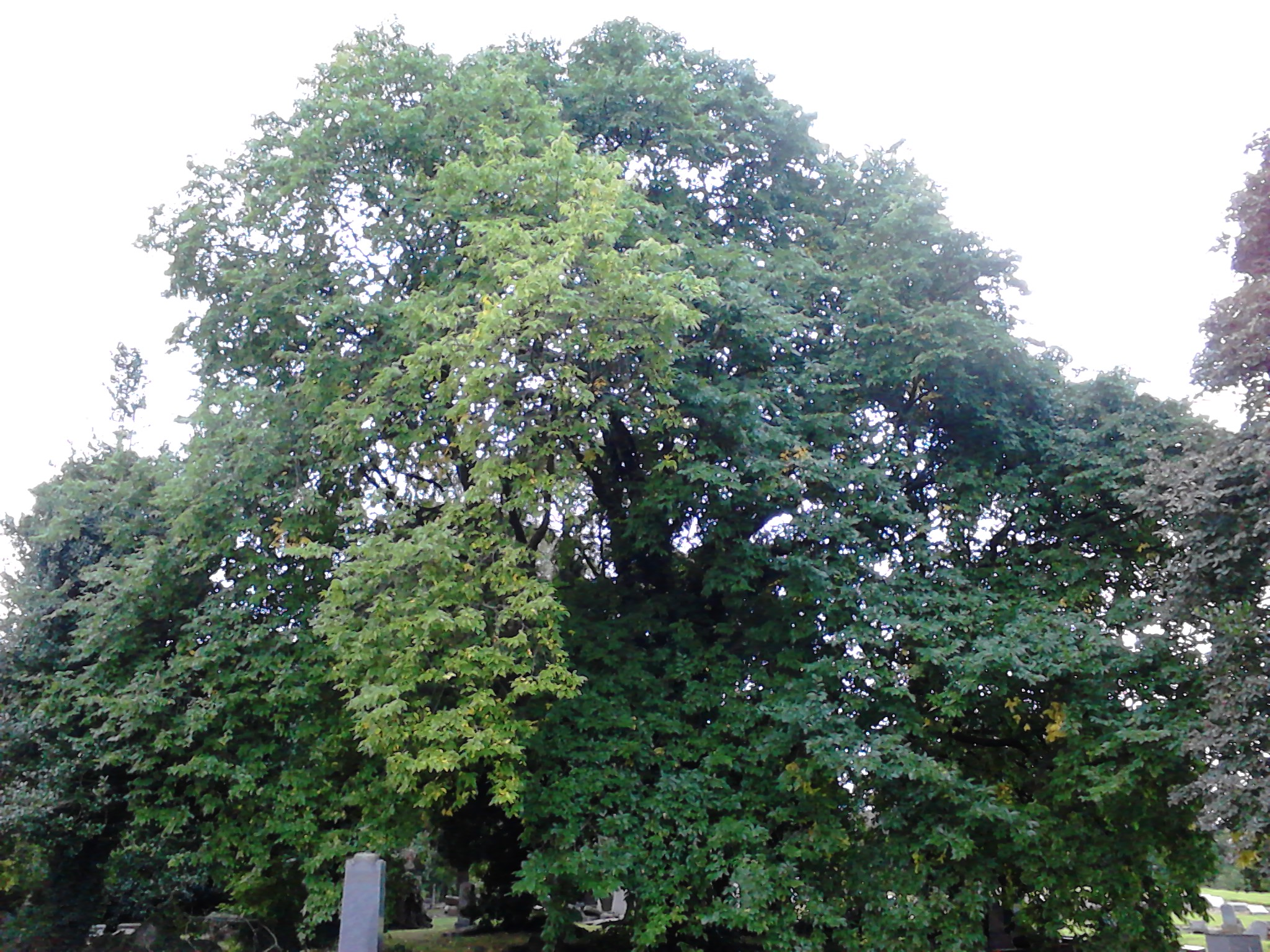
A planted smooth-leaved U. × hollandica, perhaps a named cultivar, North Merchiston Cemetery, Edinburgh (2016)

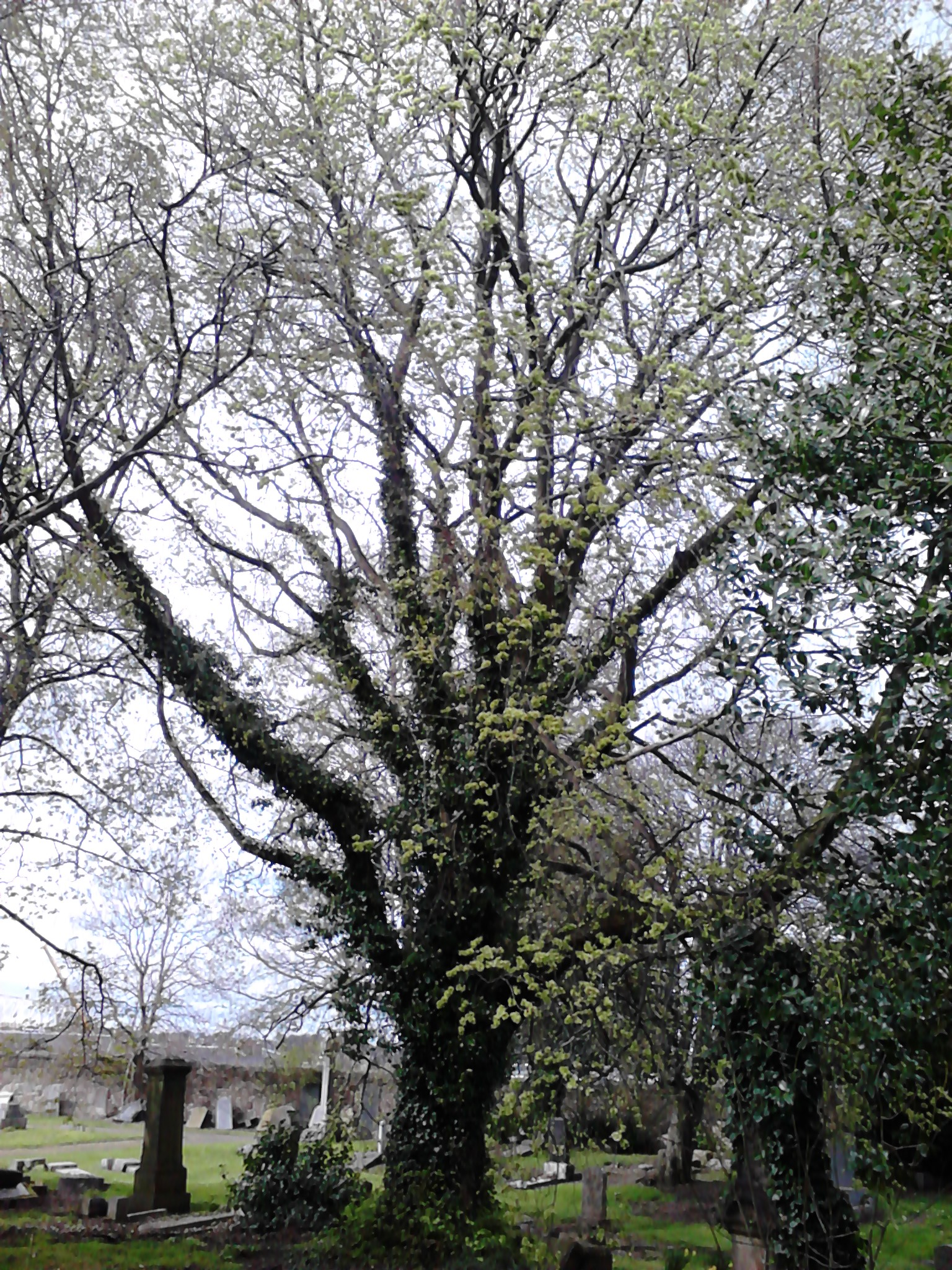
Same, fruiting

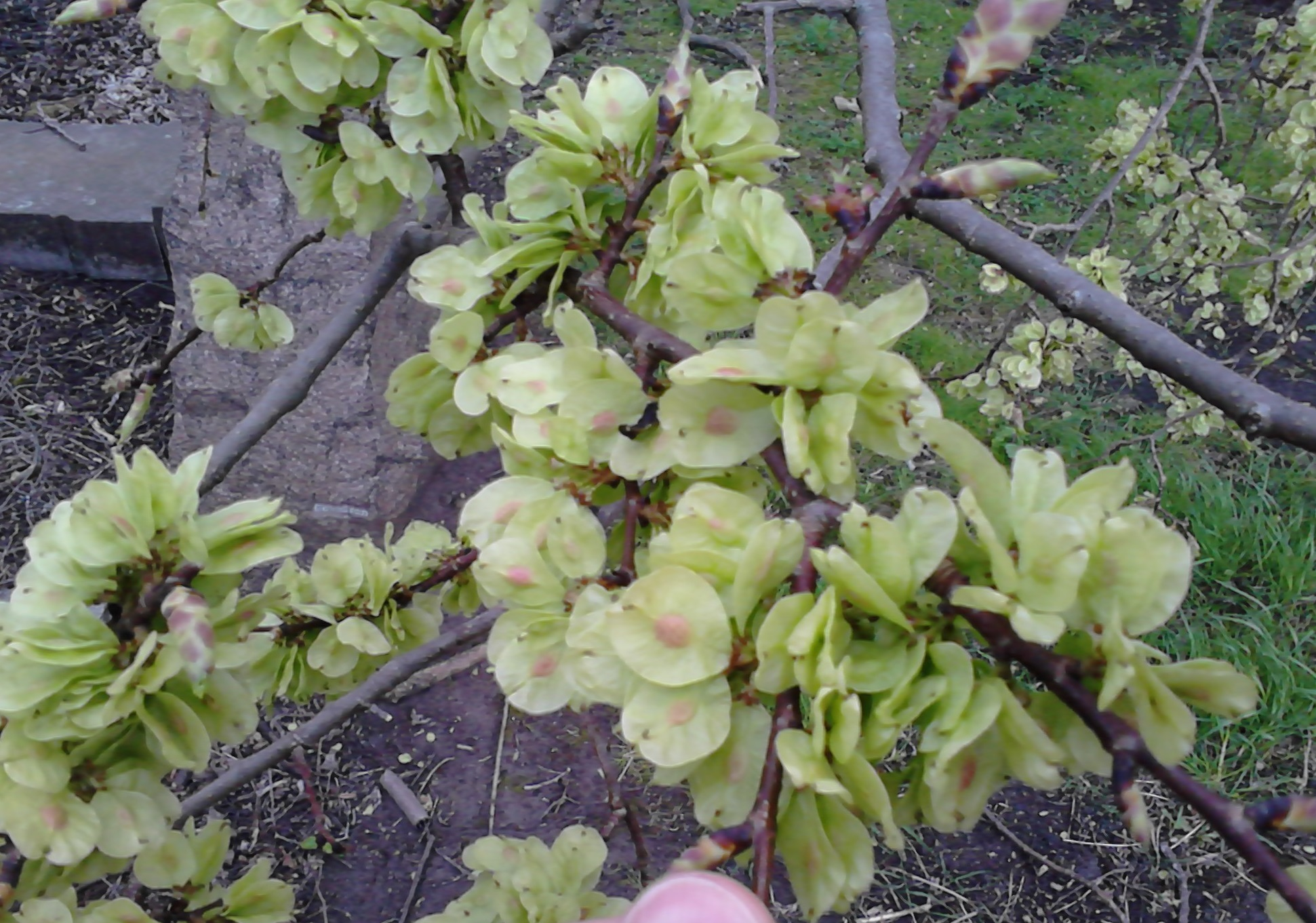
Fruit

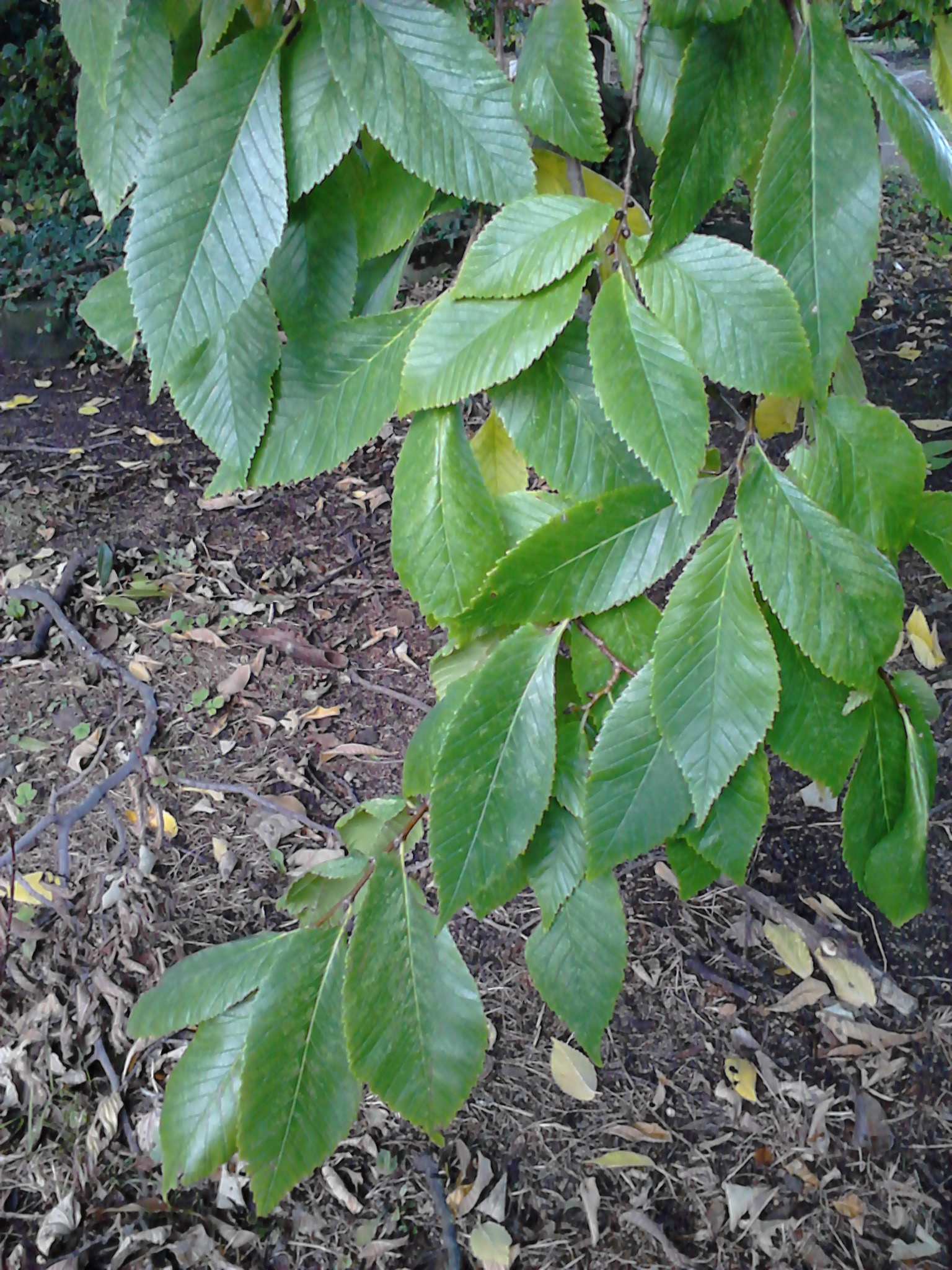
Foliage

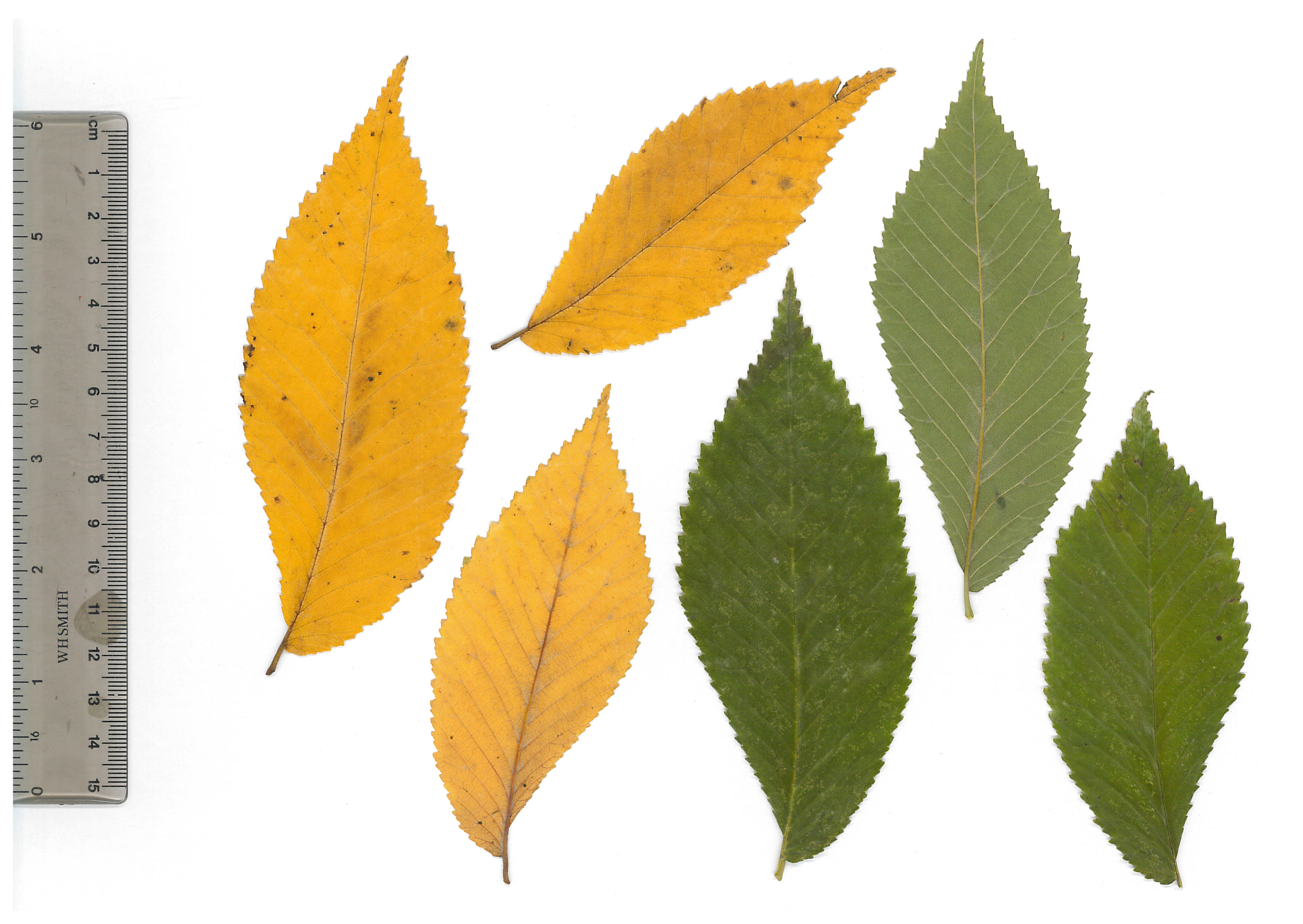
Dried leaves, showing a longer petiole than that of wych elm

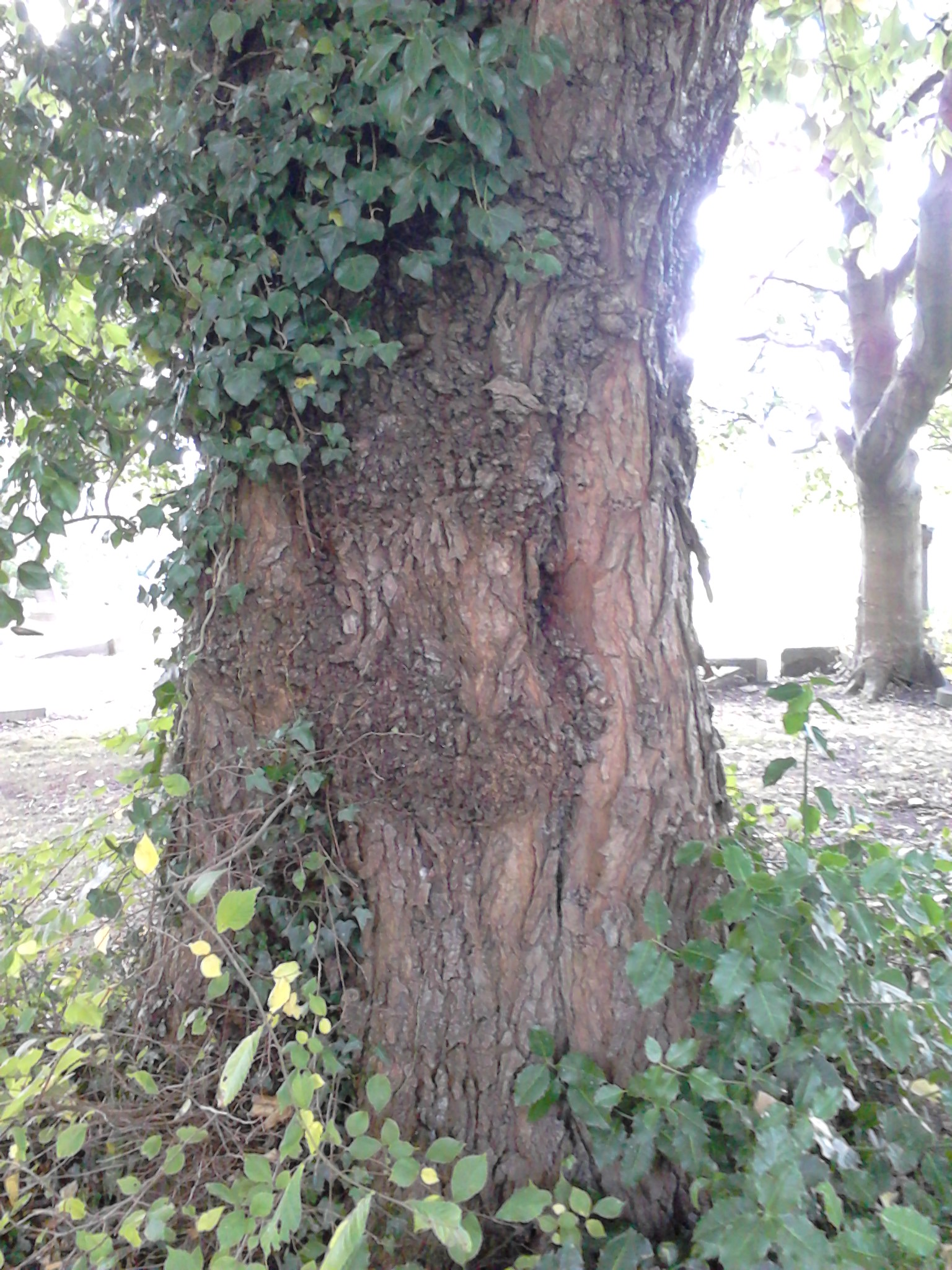
Bark

== In art ==
The elms in the Suffolk landscape-paintings and drawings of John Constable were "most probably East Anglian hybrid elms ... such as still grow in the same hedges" in Dedham Vale and East Bergholt. (His Flatford Mill elms were U. minor.) Elm trees in Old Hall Park, East Bergholt, showing a clump of these hybrids, is often considered the finest of Constable's elm-studies.

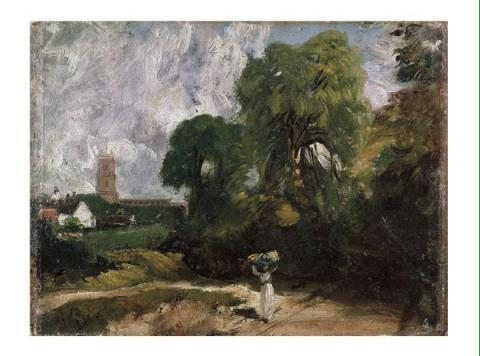
John Constable, Stoke-by-Nayland, Suffolk, c.1830

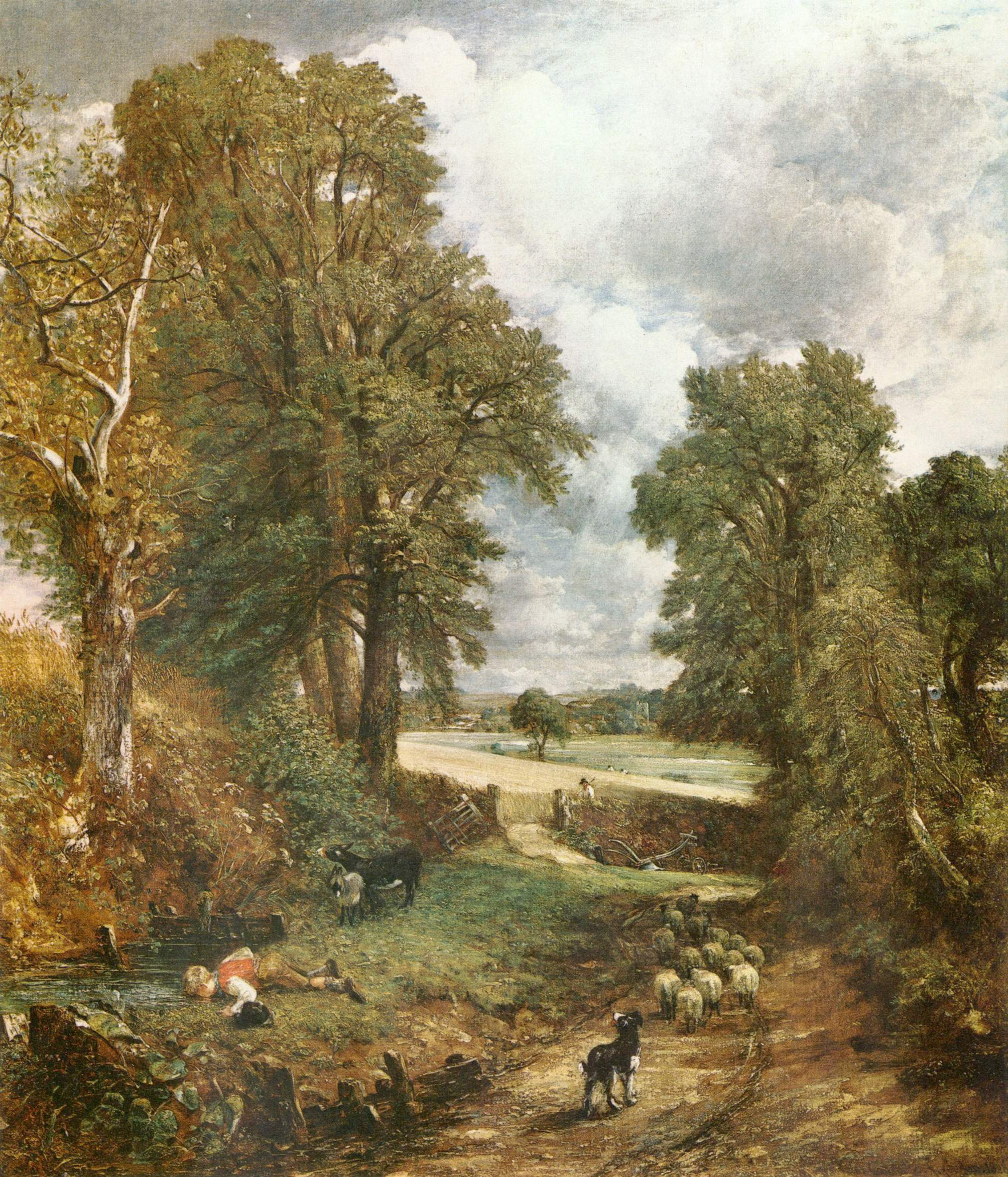
John Constable, The Cornfield, 1826 (lane between East Bergholt and Dedham)

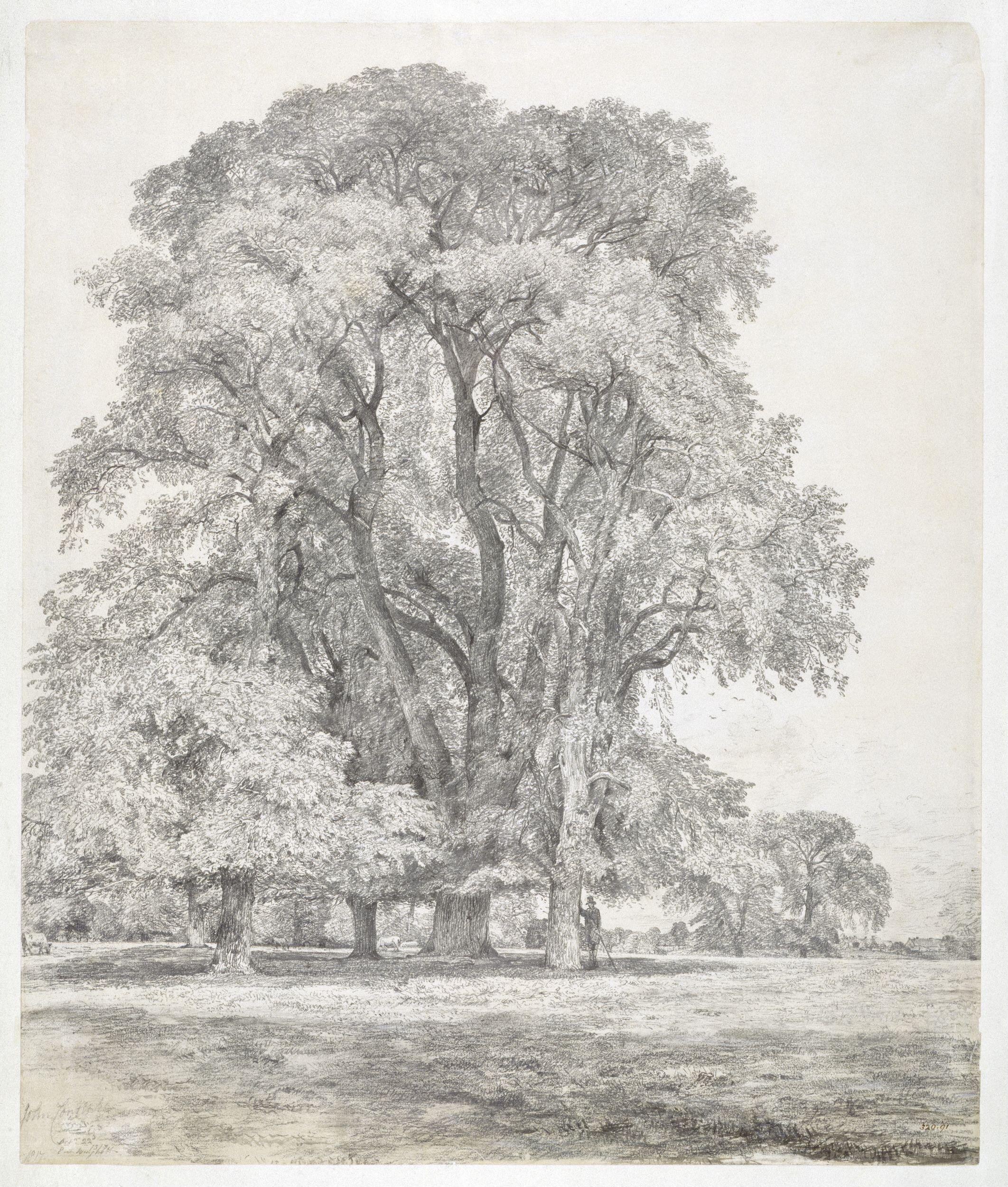
John Constable, Elm trees in Old Hall Park, East Bergholt, 1817 (Ulmus × hollandica)

== Accessions ==
=== North America ===
- Arnold Arboretum, US. Acc. nos. 325-81, 7614, 92-38
- Bartlett Tree Experts, US. Acc. nos. 1245, 1246
- New York Botanical Garden, US. Acc. no. 508/79
- Niagara Parks Botanical Gardens, US. Acc. no. 940414

=== Europe ===
- Sir Harold Hillier Gardens, UK. Acc. no. 1977.0615
- Wijdemeren City Council, Netherlands. Elm collection. Frans Halslaan, Loosdrecht (~1960)

=== Australasia ===
- Eastwoodhill Arboretum , Gisborne, New Zealand. 24 trees, details not known.
- Waite Arboretum, University of Adelaide, Adelaide, Australia. Acc. nos. 368, 339

== Nurseries ==
=== North America ===
None known.

=== Europe ===
- Boomwekerijen 'De Batterijen', Netherlands.

=== Australasia ===
- Fleming's Nursery , Monbulk, Victoria, Australia
