= Ulmus × hollandica 'Fulva' =

Elm cultivar

- Hybrid parentage: U. glabra × U. minor
- Cultivar: 'Fulva'
- Origin: Germany

The hybrid elm cultivar Ulmus × hollandica 'Fulva' is one of a number of cultivars arising from the crossing of Wych Elm U. glabra with Field Elm U. minor. Originally raised by Hesse's Nurseries, Weener, Germany, as Ulmus fulva Hort. (i.e. a horticultural tree or cultivar), it was mentioned in Mededeeling, Comite inzake Bestudeering en Bestrijding van de Iepenziekte 10: 9, 1932, but without description. In her 1933 paper Christine Buisman listed the plantings in The Hague under Ulmus × hollandica. Hesse's 1933 catalogue contains both U. fulva Hort. and U. fulva Michx..

NB. The tree should not be confused with Ulmus fulva Michx., a synonym of the American Red, or Slippery, Elm now known as Ulmus rubra

== Description ==
Not available. A herbarium specimen from a 'Fulva' in the Hague (1931) shows large leaves to 12 cm., with 1 cm. petioles.

== Pests and diseases ==
Unknown.

== Cultivation ==
No specimens are known to survive.
