= Ulmus × hollandica 'Freja' =

Elm cultivar

- Hybrid parentage: U. glabra × U. minor
- Cultivar: 'Freja'
- Origin: Denmark

The elm cultivar Ulmus × hollandica 'Freja' is one of five miniature or bonsai cultivars from the Elegantissima Group raised by the Gartneriet Vestdal nursery in Odense, Denmark.

== Description ==
'Freja' is distinguished by the bright edges to its leaves.

== Nurseries ==
=== Europe ===
- Gartneriet Vestdal , Odense, Denmark.
