= Ulmus × hollandica 'Haarlemensis' =

Elm cultivar

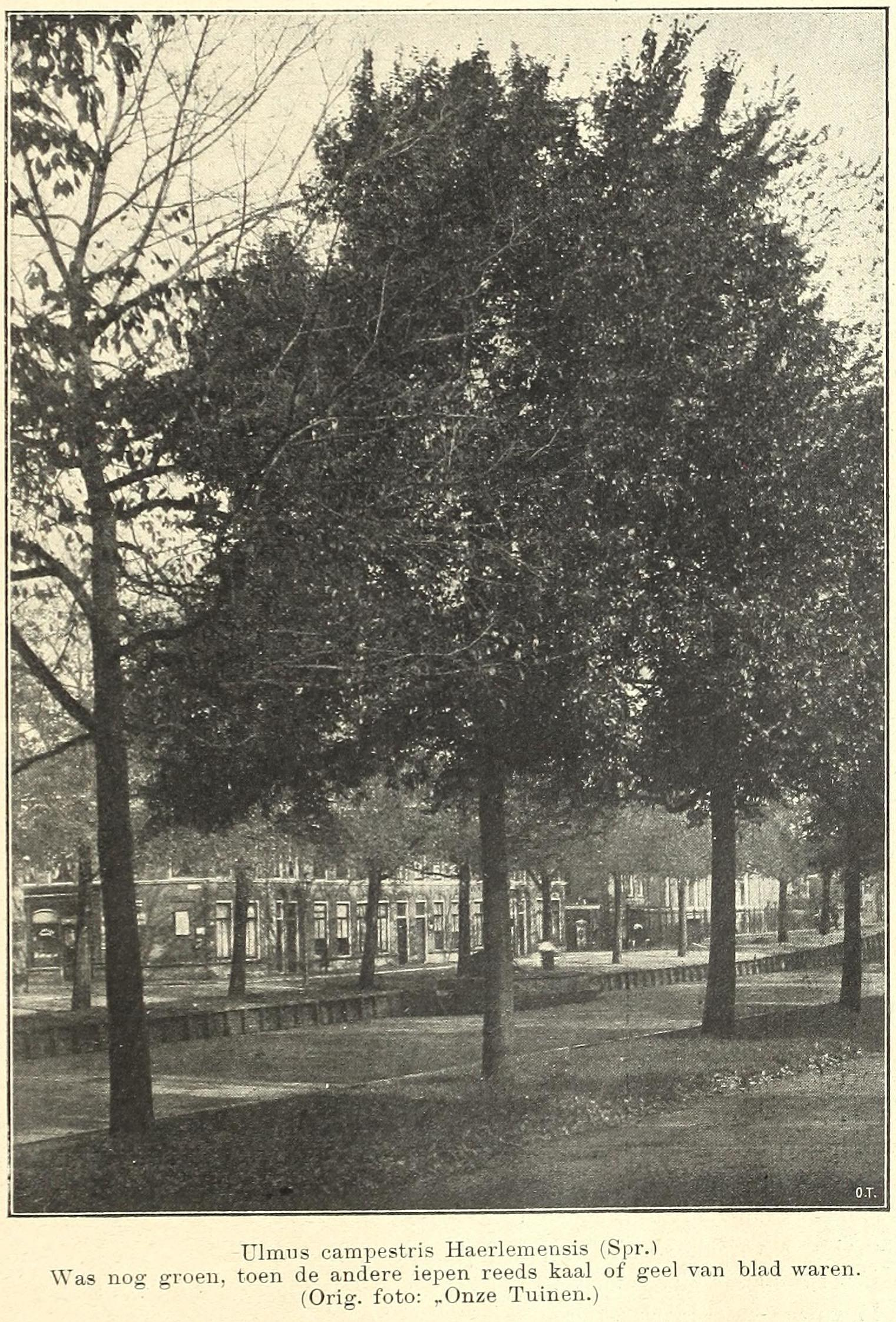
- 'Haarlemensis' before 1912
- Hybrid parentage: U. glabra × U. minor
- Cultivar: 'Haarlemensis'
- Origin: Netherlands

The elm cultivar Ulmus × hollandica 'Haarlemensis', said to have been grown from seed c.1880 from a hybrid parent tree, was first listed by Springer as U. campestris haarlemensis in 1912.

== Description ==
A slow-growing tree, forming an unbroken, broad pyramidal crown, with small, glossy, dark-green leaves persisting for several weeks longer than most in autumn.

== Cultivation ==
Saplings grown from seed by Haarlem head forester J. Kollerie were first planted along a new canal in the city in 1891. An U. campestris 'Haarlemensis' was cultivated in the Poort Bulten Arboretum in the 20th century. No specimens are known to survive.
