= Ulmus 'Escaillard' =

Elm cultivar

- Genus: Ulmus
- Cultivar: 'Escaillard'
- Origin: France

The elm cultivar Ulmus 'Escaillard' was first described by Dumont de Courset in 1811, and listed, without description, as Ulmus escaillard, by the André Leroy nursery at Angers, France, in 1849. It was distributed by the Baudriller nursery of Angers and by Hesse's nursery, Weener, Germany, as U. campestris 'Escaillardii', both nurseries using U. montana for wych elm cultivars. Herbarium specimens from a tree in The Hague obtained from the Hesse nursery label it variously U. glabra 'Escaillardii' and Ulmus × hollandica 'Escaillardi'. The latter was Christine Buisman's determination (1931), identifiable as hers by its handwriting and red label.

== Description ==
'Escaillard' was a small-leaved elm.

== Cultivation ==
'Escaillard' was present in The Hague in the 1930s. No specimens are known to survive.

== Synonymy ==
- Ulmus campestris var. escaillardii.
