= Ulmus × hollandica 'Muscaviensis' =

Elm cultivar

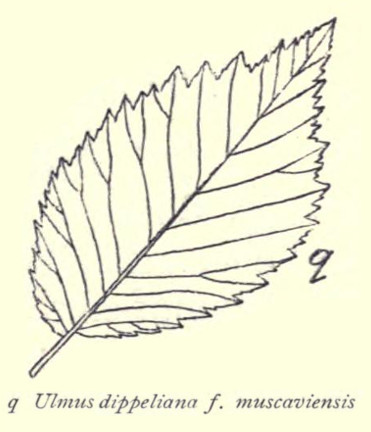
- Leaf-drawing of 'Muscaviensis'
- Hybrid parentage: U. glabra × U. minor
- Cultivar: 'Muscaviensis'
- Origin: Europe

The hybrid elm cultivar Ulmus × hollandica 'Muscaviensis' was listed by Schneider in Illustriertes Handbuch der Laubholzkunde 1:219, 1904 as U. dippeliana f. muscaviensis. The name 'Muscaviensis' refers to its origin in Muskau Arboretum (Arboretum Muscaviense), where Eduard Petzold raised elms in the late 19th century.

== Description ==
The tree was described as being larger than U. glabra viminalis (: Ulmus × viminalis Lodd.), with leaves measuring < 9 cm long by < 5 cm broad.

== Cultivation ==
No specimens are known to survive, but hybrids cultivars of this group, if propagated vegetatively, can persist through sucker regrowth.

== Synonymy ==
- Ulmus dippeliana f. muscaviensis: C. K. Schneid., in Illustriertes Handbuch der Laubholzkunde, 1:219, 1904.
