= Ulmus × hollandica 'Viscosa' =

Elm cultivar

- Hybrid parentage: U. glabra × U. minor
- Cultivar: 'Viscosa'
- Origin: Europe

The hybrid elm Ulmus × hollandica 'Viscosa' is probably one of a number of cultivars arising from the crossing of the Wych Elm U. glabra with a variety of Field Elm U. minor. The tree was listed by Loddiges, (Hackney, London) in his catalogue of 1836 and two years later by Loudon in Arboretum et Fruticetum Britannicum 3: 1378, 1838, as U. viscosa. An early specimen in the Herbarium Dumortier named U. viscosa Audibert was later sunk by Melville as U. × hollandica.

== Description ==
'Viscosa' was distinguished by its large, deep-green leaves with anthocyanin pigment.

== Cultivation ==
No specimens are known to survive in Europe.

== Synonymy ==
- Ulmus viscosa: Loddiges, and Loudon (see text).
