= Ulmus × hollandica 'Alba' =

Elm cultivar

- Hybrid parentage: U. glabra × U. minor
- Cultivar: 'Alba'
- Origin: Europe

Ulmus × hollandica 'Alba' is one of a number of hybrids arising from the crossing of the Wych Elm U. glabra with a variety of Field Elm U. minor. First mentioned by Kirchner in 1864 as U. fulva Hort. var. alba.

== Description ==
A specimen in the Herb. Nicholson at Kew was identified by Melville as a rather broad-leafed form of U. × hollandica var vegeta (sensu Rehder).

== Cultivation ==
No specimens are known to survive.
