= Ulmus × hollandica 'Odin' =

Elm cultivar

- Hybrid parentage: U. glabra × U. minor
- Cultivar: 'Odin'
- Origin: Denmark

The elm cultivar Ulmus × hollandica 'Odin' is one of five miniature or bonsai cultivars from the Elegantissima Group raised by the Gartneriet Vestdal nursery in Odense, Denmark.

== Description ==
'Odin' is distinguished by its light-green leaves and their irregular margins.

== Nurseries ==
=== Europe ===
Gartneriet Vestdal , Odense, Denmark.
