= Ulmus × hollandica 'Loke' =

Elm cultivar

- Hybrid parentage: U. glabra × U. minor
- Cultivar: 'Loke'
- Origin: Denmark

The elm cultivar Ulmus × hollandica 'Loke' is one of five miniature or bonsai cultivars from the Elegantissima group raised by the Gartneriet Vestdal nursery in Odense, Denmark.

== Description ==
'Loke' is distinguished by its lime yellow foliage, compact growth, and propensity to develop side shoots.

== Nurseries ==
=== Europe ===
- Gartneriet Vestdal, Odense, Denmark.
- Tibidao AB, Sweden.
