= Ulmus × hollandica 'Tyr' =

Elm cultivar

- Hybrid parentage: U. glabra × U. minor
- Cultivar: 'Tyr'
- Origin: Denmark

The elm cultivar Ulmus × hollandica 'Tyr' is one of five miniature or bonsai cultivars from the Elegantissima Group raised by the Gartneriet Vestdal nursery in Odense, Denmark.

== Description ==
'Tyr' is distinguished by its upright growth and fewer sideshoots.

== Nurseries ==
=== Europe ===
Gartneriet Vestdal , Odense, Denmark.
