= Ulmus × hollandica 'Microphylla' =

Elm cultivar

- Hybrid parentage: U. glabra × U. minor
- Cultivar: 'Microphylla'
- Origin: Europe

The hybrid elm cultivar Ulmus × hollandica 'Microphylla' was listed in the Loddiges (Hackney, London), Catalogue of 1823 (page 23) as U. stricta microphylla but without description. A specimen in the Herb. Nicholson at Kew was identified by Melville as U. × hollandica.

== Description ==
Not available.

== Cultivation ==
No specimens are known to survive.
