= Ulmus × hollandica 'Fjerrestad' =

Elm cultivar

- Hybrid parentage: U. glabra × U. minor
- Cultivar: 'Fjerrestad'
- Origin: Sweden

The hybrid cultivar Ulmus × hollandica 'Fjerrestad' is one of a number of cultivars arising from the crossing of the Wych Elm U. glabra with a variety of Field Elm U. minor. The tree was first mentioned in Mededeeling, Comite inzake Bestudeering en Bestrijding van de Iepenziekte 13: 9, 1933, but without description.

== Description ==
None available.

== Pests and diseases ==
The cultivar was "very susceptible" to Dutch elm disease.

== Cultivation ==
In the Netherlands there were plantings in Utrecht, Baarn, and The Hague in the 1930s. No specimens are known to survive.

== Etymology ==
The clone is named for the village of Fjärrestad in Skåne between Landskrona and Helsingborg, Sweden.

== Hybrid cultivars ==
'Fjerrestad' was crossed with Ulmus × hollandica and U. minor in the Dutch elm breeding programme before World War II, but none of the progeny were of particular note and were discarded.
