= Ulmus × hollandica 'Angustifolia' =

Elm cultivar

- Hybrid parentage: U. glabra × U. minor
- Cultivar: 'Angustifolia'
- Origin: England?

Ulmus × hollandica 'Angustifolia' is one of a number of hybrids arising from the crossing of the Wych Elm U. glabra with a variety of Field Elm U. minor, first identified as Ulmus hollandica var. angustifolia by Weston in The Universal Botanist and Nurseryman 1: 315, 1770, and confirmed from herbarium specimens by Green as Ulmus × hollandica.

== Description ==
The tree was chiefly distinguished by its narrow leaves.

== Cultivation ==
No specimens are known to survive, but a hybrid cultivar matching the description of 'Angustifolia' was distributed by the Späth nursery of Berlin from the late 19th century as Ulmus montana 'Viminalis', and remains extant.

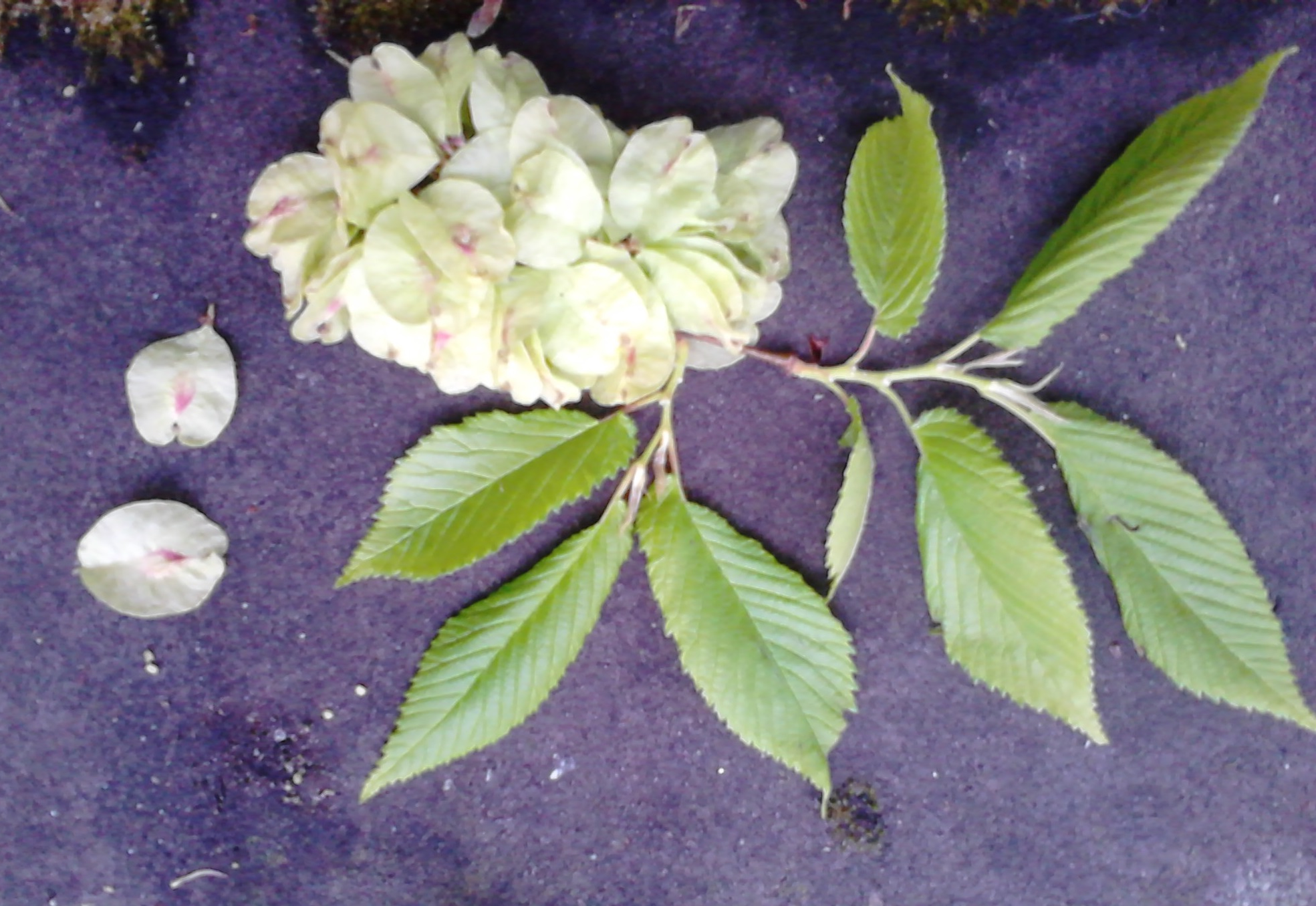
Narrow-leaved Ulmus × hollandica cultivar ('Viminalis') in Edinburgh: hybrid fruit and new leaves

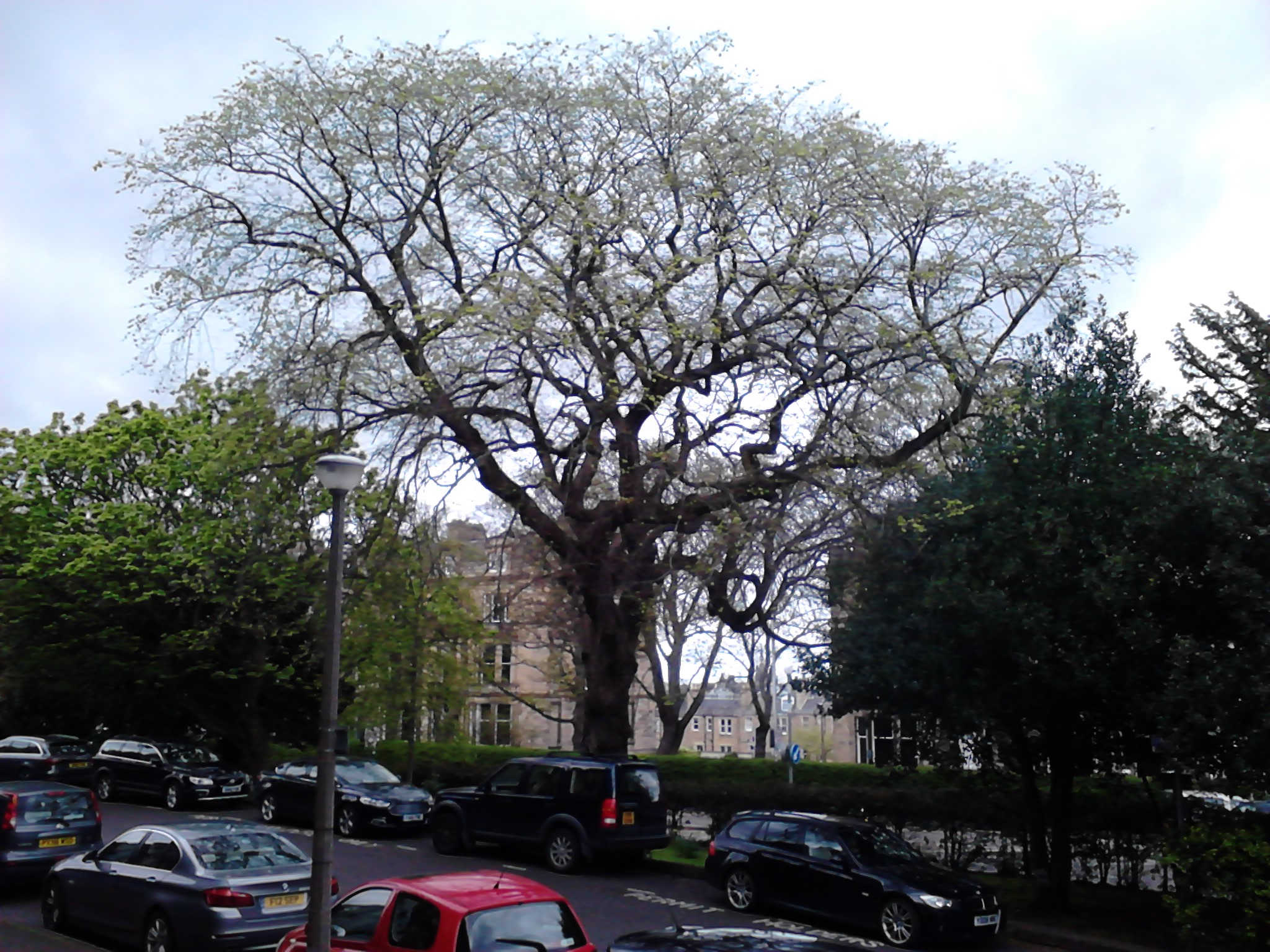
Narrow-leaved Ulmus × hollandica cultivar ('Viminalis'), Buckingham Terrace, Edinburgh; spring

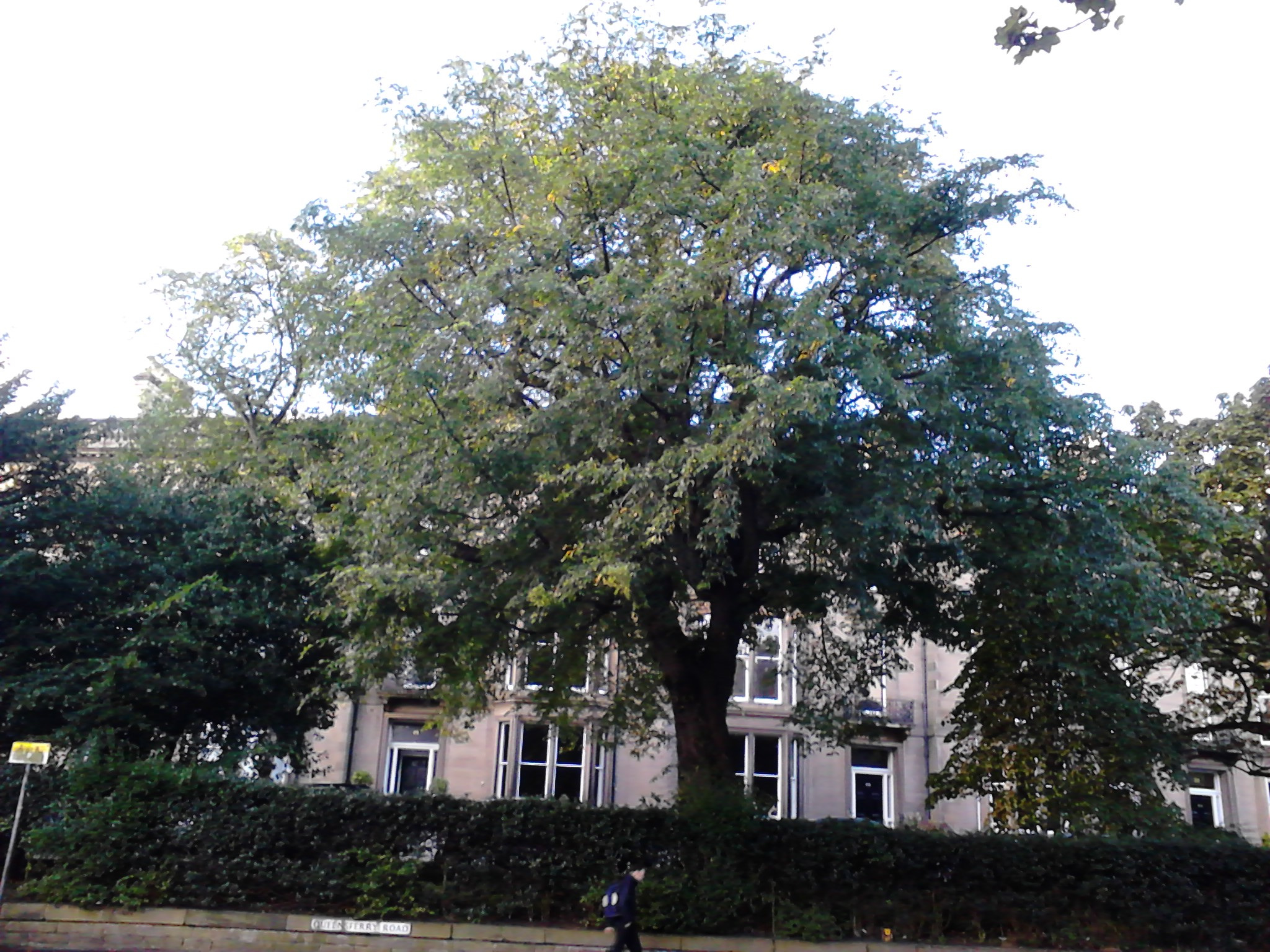
Narrow-leaved Ulmus × hollandica cultivar, Buckingham Terrace, Edinburgh; summer
