= Lineage Wood & Railway Track, Long Melford =

Protected area in Suffolk, England

Coordinates: 52.1°N 0.76°E

- Site of Special Scientific Interest
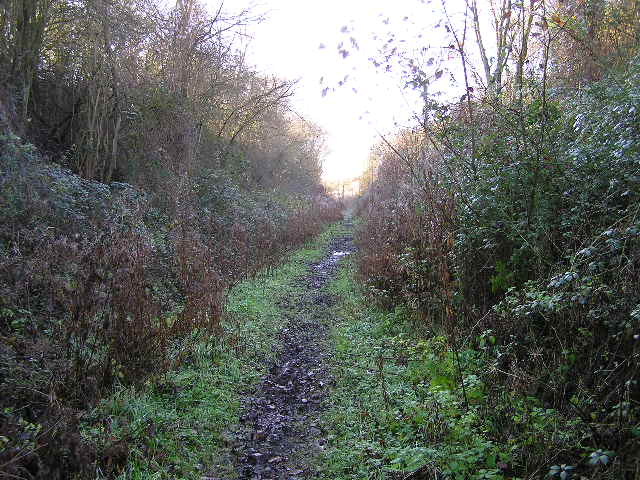
- Location of Lineage Wood & Railway Track, Long Melford.
- Area of search: Suffolk
- Grid reference: TL 889 484
- Interest: Biological
- Area: 78.7 hectares
- Notification date: 1987
- Location map: Magic Map

Lineage Wood & Railway Track, Long Melford is a 78.7-hectare (194-acre) biological Site of Special Scientific Interest northeast of Long Melford in Suffolk.

Lineage Wood has neutral grassland rides with diverse flora, especially orchids such as the greater butterfly, fly orchid, common spotted and bee orchid. A total of 22 species of butterfly have been recorded. The disused railway line also has floristically rich grassland, although the soil is more alkaline.

Lineage Wood is private land with no public access, but the St Edmund Way footpath runs along the disused railway line.
