= Ulmus glabra 'Latifolia' =

Elm cultivar

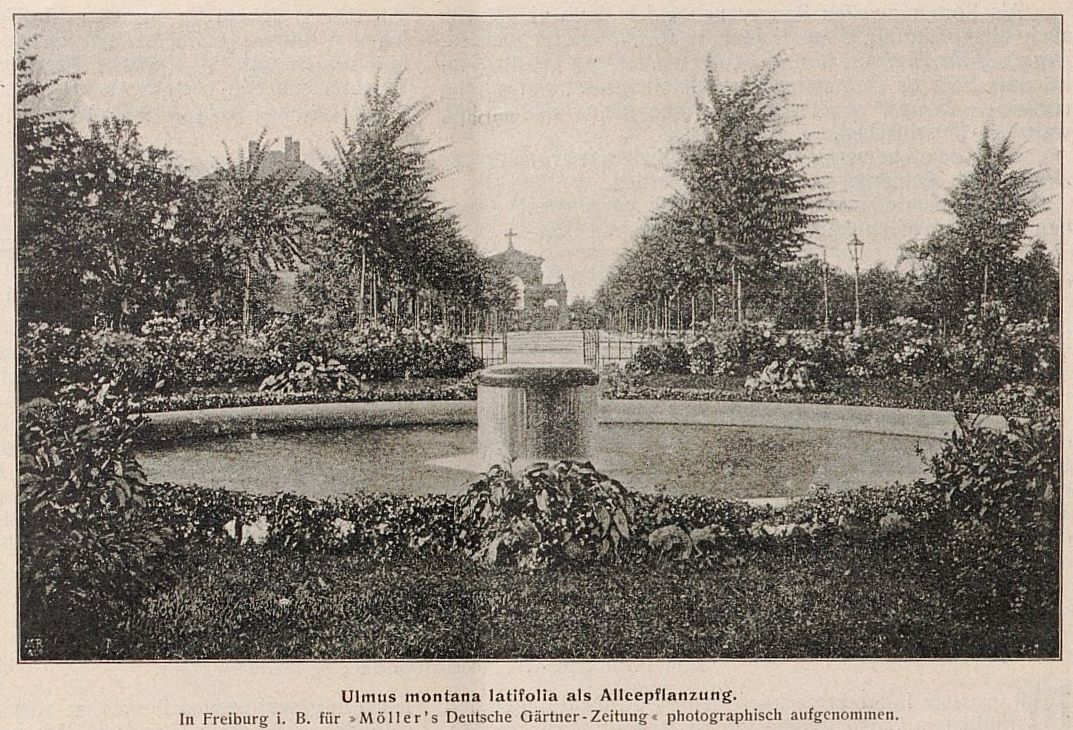
- Ulmus montana latifolia, New Cemetery, Freiburg, 1901
- Species: Ulmus glabra
- Cultivar: 'Latifolia'
- Origin: Mechelen, Belgium

The putative Wych Elm cultivar Ulmus glabra 'Latifolia' was identified in Audibert's Tonelle (1817) as U. campestris Linn. [ = U. glabra Huds.] latifolia. The tree is reputed to have originated circa 1750 in or around Mechelen, and to have been widely planted throughout Belgium. Möller in Deutsche Gärtner-Zeitung (1901) gave U. scabra Mill. latifolia as a synonym of the Ulmus montana latifolia marketed in Germany, confirming it as a wych elm cultivar.

A non-wych form, Ulmus glabra Mill. [:smooth-leaved] var. latifolia was described by Lindley in A Synopsis of British Flora, arranged according to the Natural Order (1829), from trees near West Hatch, Epping Forest, Essex. A tree listed by that name grew in the Royal Victoria Park, Bath, in the mid-19th century. A 1912 herbarium specimen from Oudenbosch, shows a hybrid elm leaf labelled Ulmus x hollandica 'Latifolia', as does a 1917 herbarium specimen from Scania, Sweden. Though 'Latifolia' was considered by Green as "possibly the same as 'Belgica' (Belgian Elm)", the Späth nursery of Berlin, which used U. montana for both wych and large-leaved hybrids, marketed Ulmus montana latifolia and Ulmus montana belgica as distinct cultivars (see 'Cultivation'). The Hesse Nursery of Weener, Germany, marketed Ulmus montana latifolia in the 1930s, as well as an Ulmus latifolia, giving Ulmus Pitteursi and Ulmus hollandica as synonyms of the latter (and listing the latter with Ulmus latifolia Dumont).

== Description ==
Audibert described his tree as having broader leaves than the species, which expand very early in the spring. Möller in Deutsche Gärtner-Zeitung (1901) described Ulmus montana latifolia as a tree of lush growth that forms a broad crown with large foliage. Hanham's Bath U. glabra Mill. [:smooth-leaved] latifolia (1857) had leaves "oblong, acute, and very broad".

== Cultivation ==
No specimens are known to survive. 'Latifolia' was marketed in the late 19th century as U. montana latifolia by the Späth nursery of Berlin and by the Ulrich nursery of Warsaw, whence it was introduced to Eastern Europe. It was introduced to the Dominion Arboretum, Ottawa, Canada, probably from Späth, in 1899, as U. montana latifolia, being listed separately from U. montana belgica (planted 1896). An U. campestris latifolia appears in some early 20th C English nursery lists. An Ulmus latifolia, "compact and upright in habit" with "large leaves", appeared in the 1902 catalogue of the Bobbink and Atkins nursery, Rutherford, New Jersey. A 'Latifolia' is not known to have been introduced to Australasia.

=== Putative specimens ===
A tall Ulmus × hollandica by Cleveland Bridge, Bath (2025) (a city known to have had hybrid 'Latifolia' in the 19th and early 20th centuries), regrowth from an old stump, has leaves matching a 1917 hybrid 'Latifolia' herbarium specimen from Sweden in the Finnish Museum of Natural History.

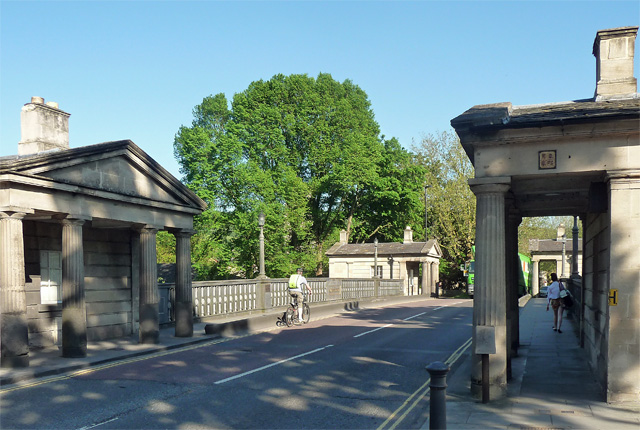
Cleveland Bridge hybrid elm, Bath (2012)

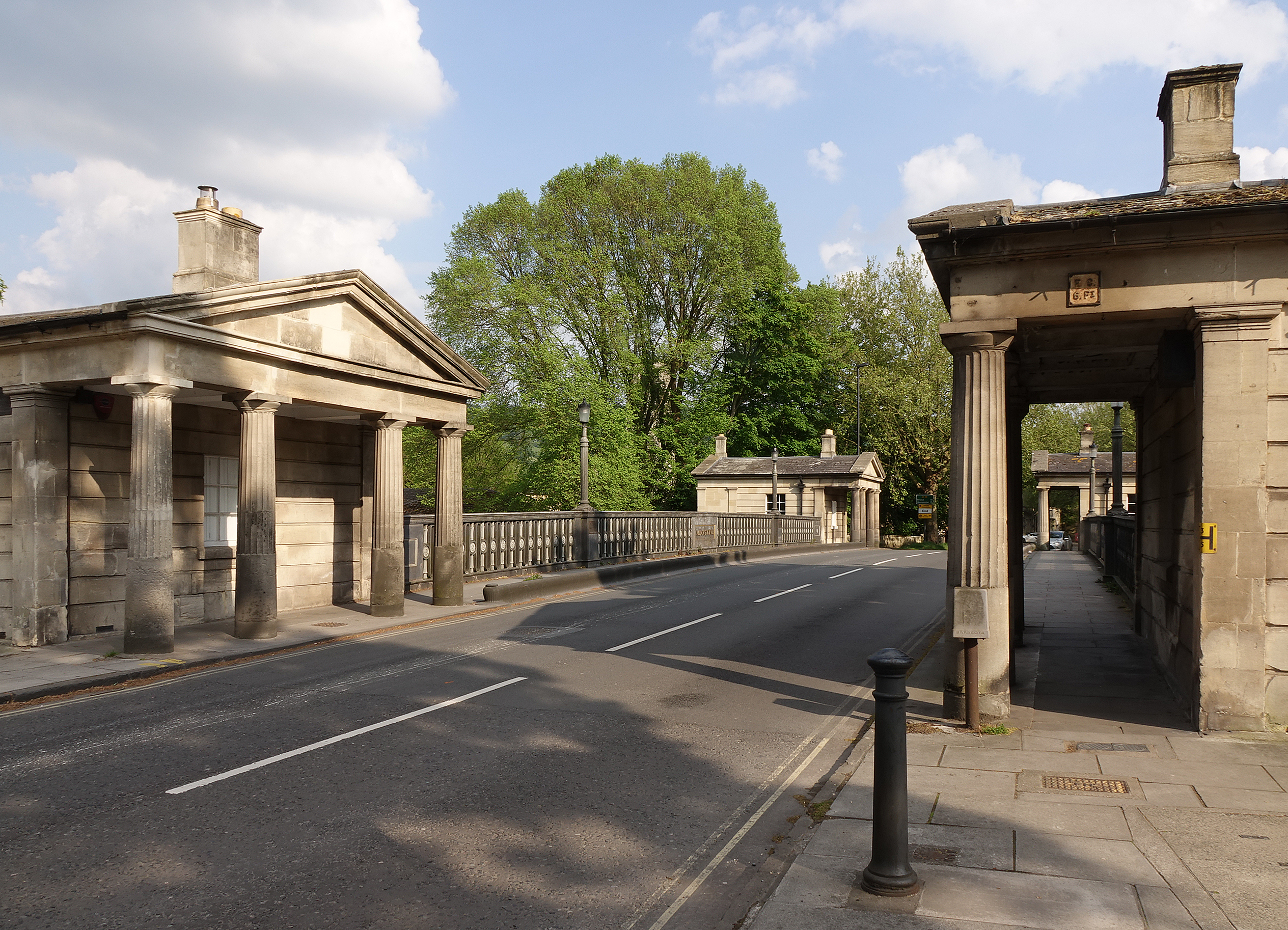
Cleveland Bridge hybrid elm, Bath (2020)

An old elm cultivar matching one of the above descriptions of 'Latifolia' and the 1912 Oudenbosch herbarium specimens stands in North Merchiston Cemetery, Edinburgh (2018). The smooth leaf and shoot, asymmetrical leaf-base, 4 mm petiole, and elongated samara, suggest hybridity, despite a resemblance to wych elm.

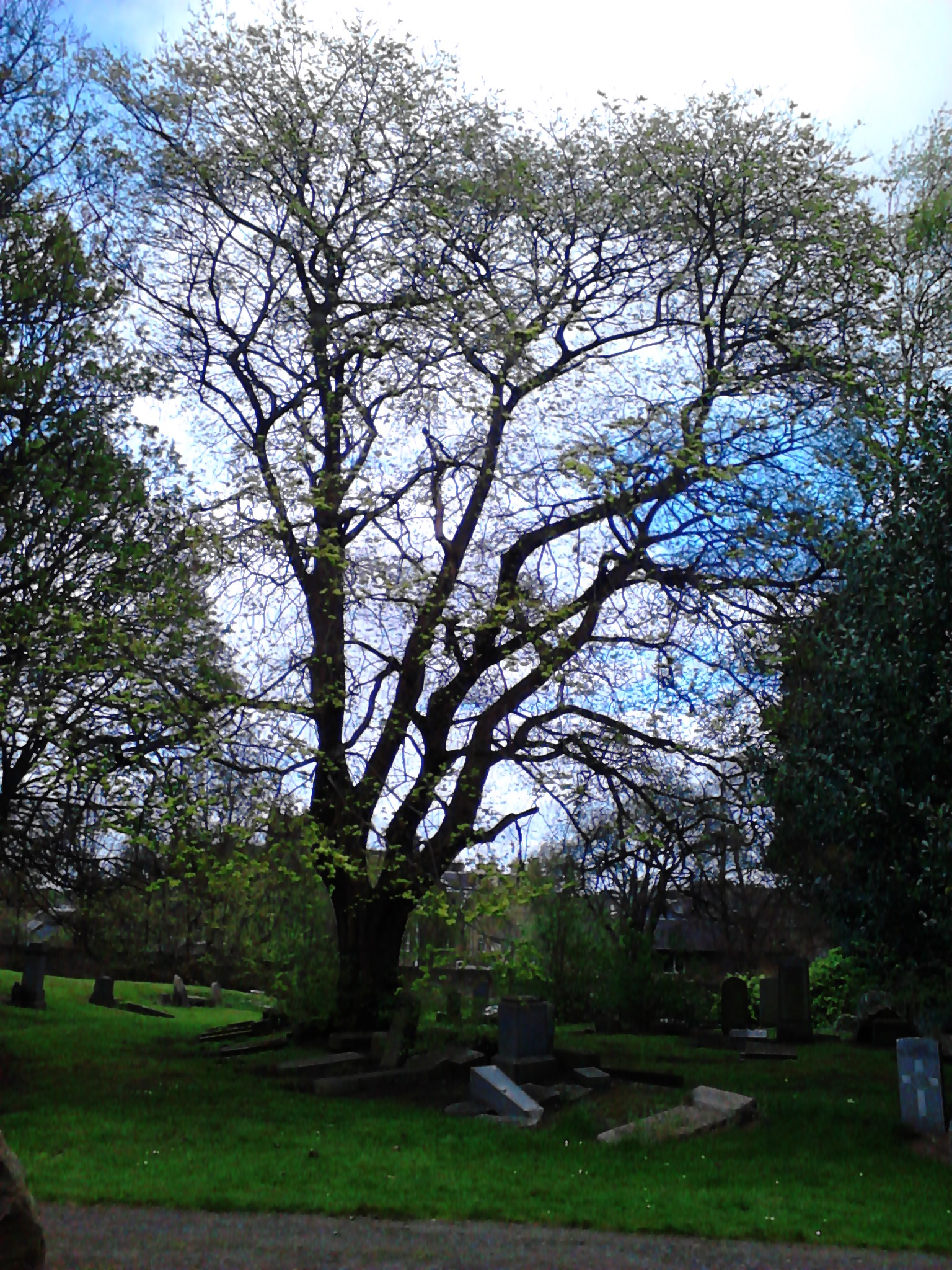
Broad-, smooth-leaved elm cultivar, North Merchiston Cemetery, Edinburgh

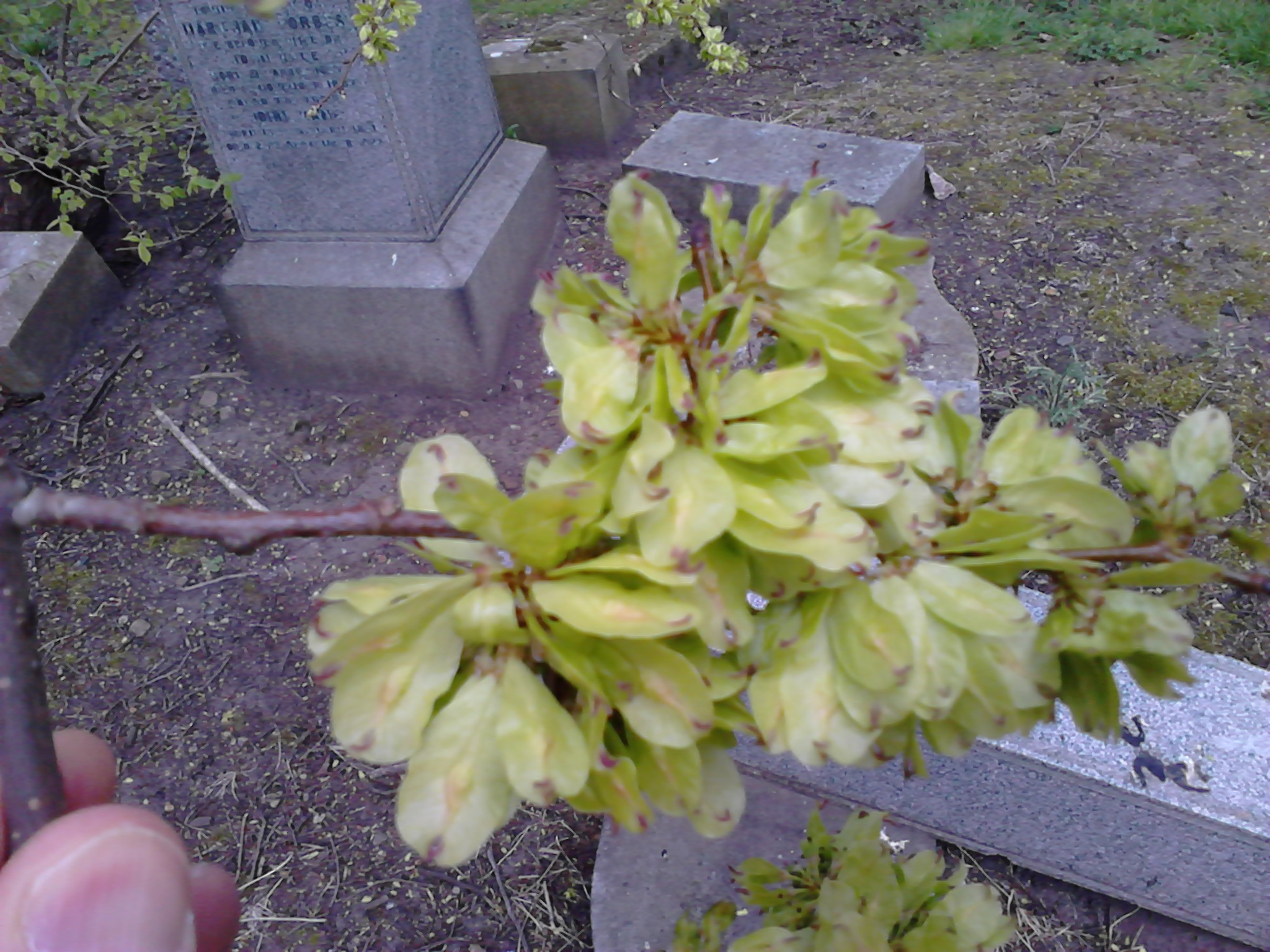
Samarae of same

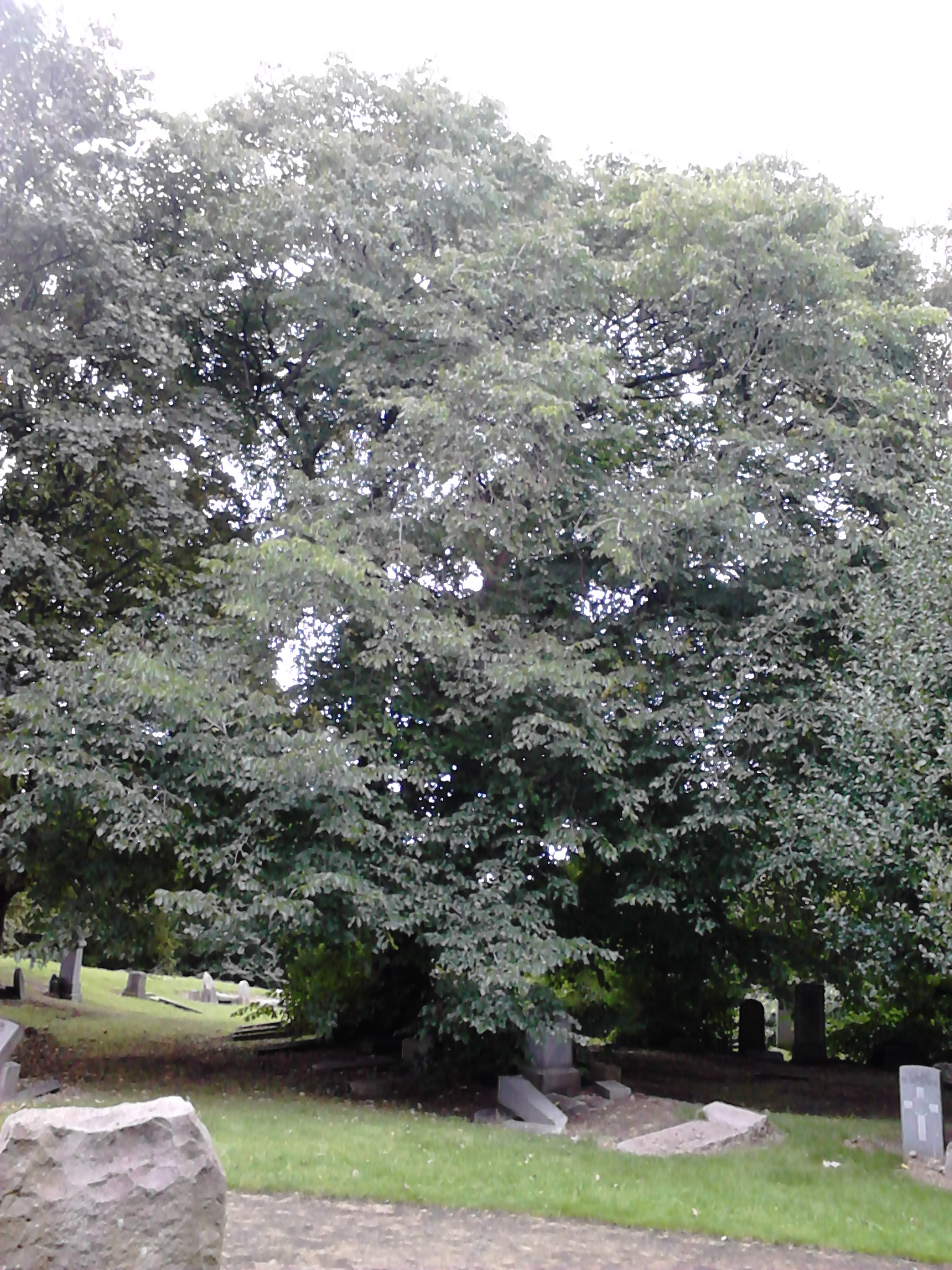
Same, summer

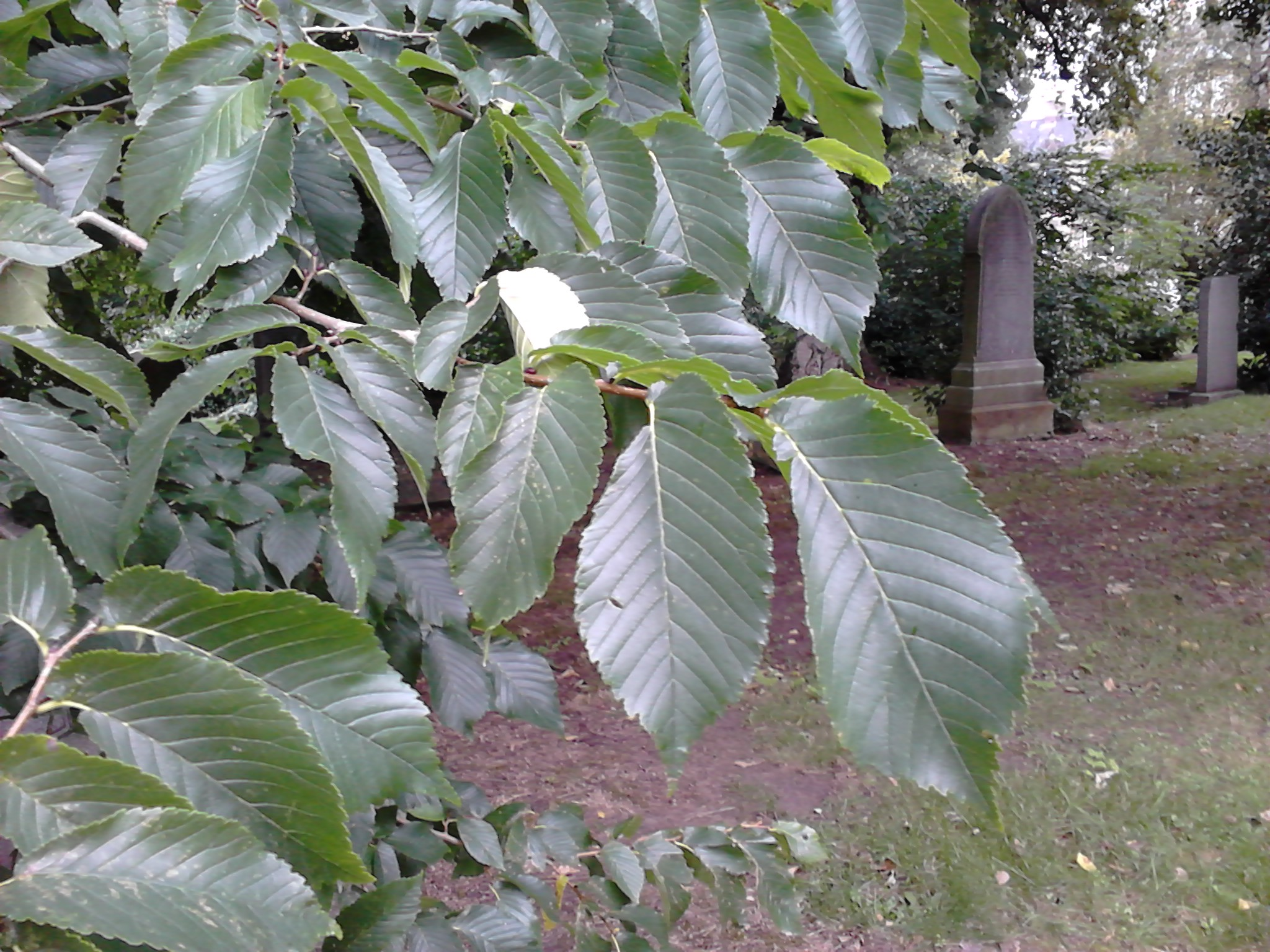
Foliage

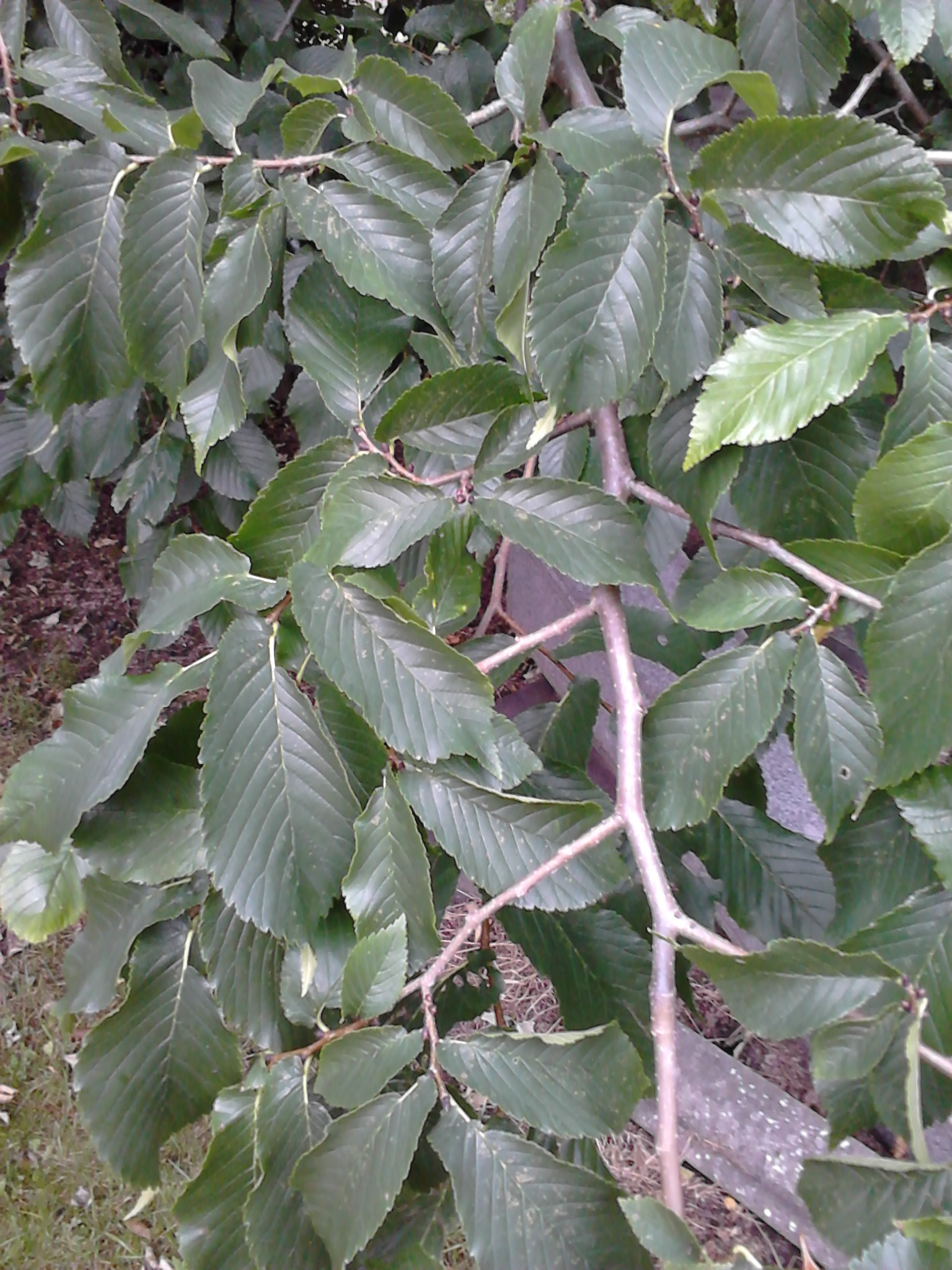
Foliage

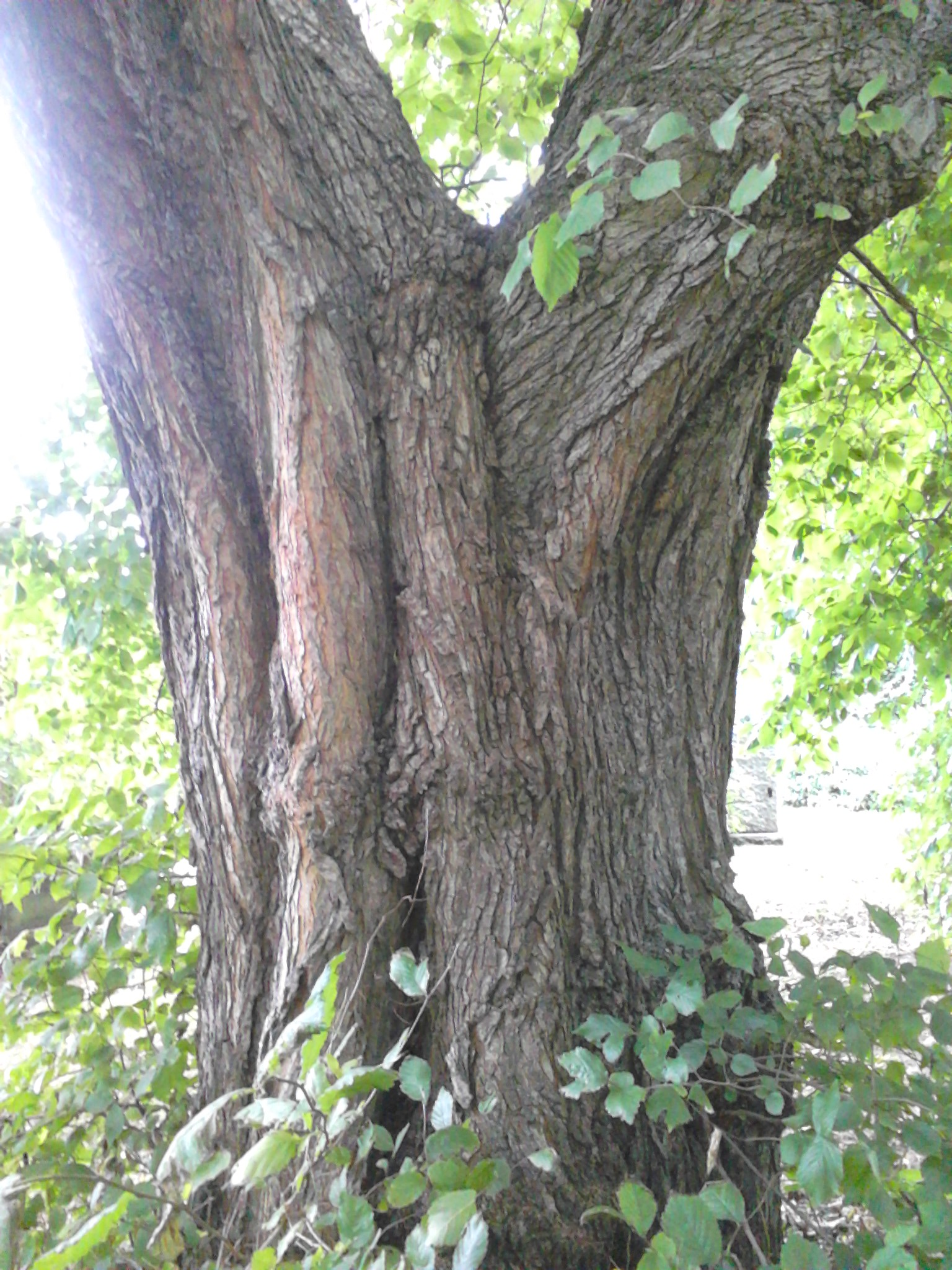
Bark

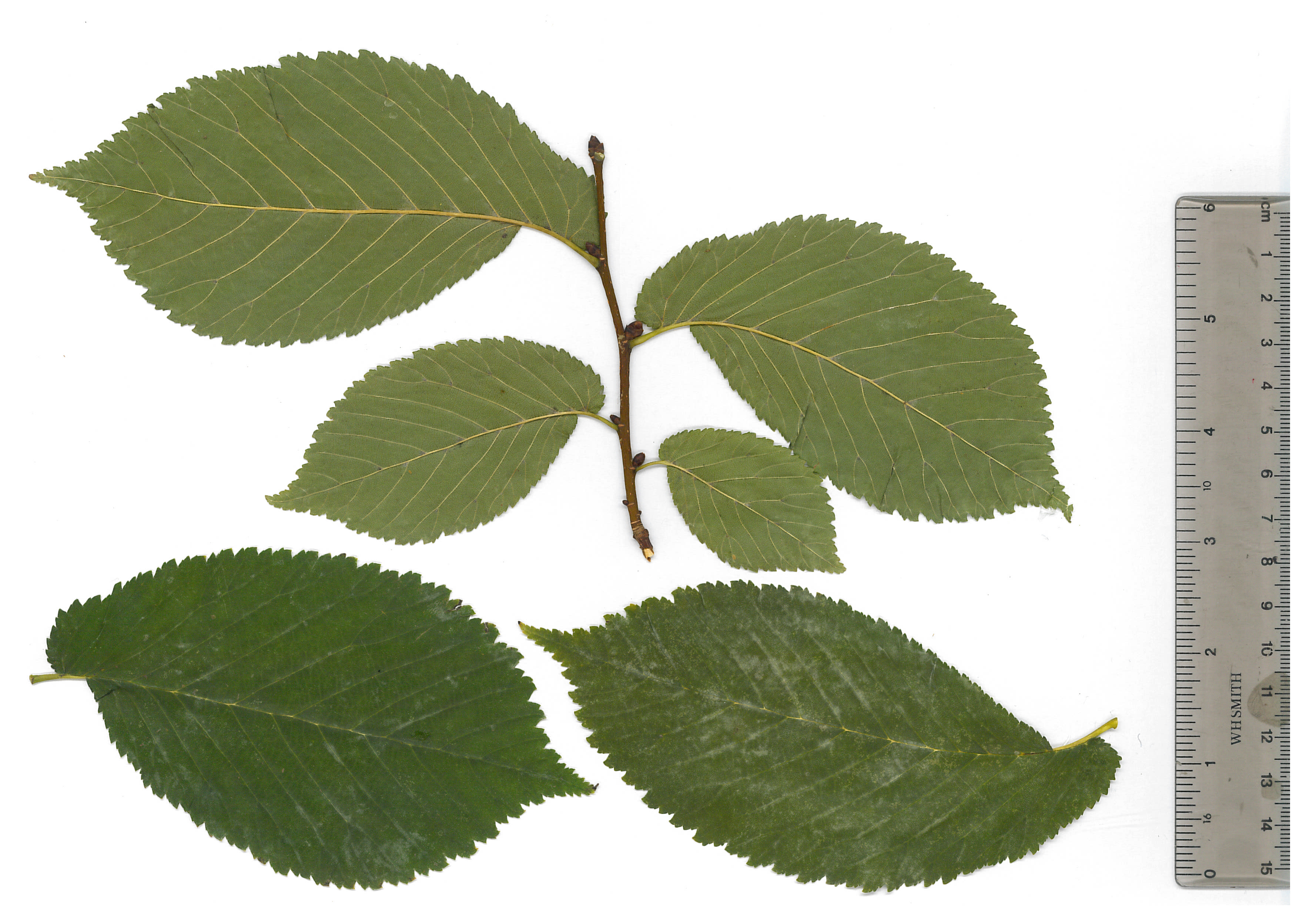
Pressed short-shoot leaves

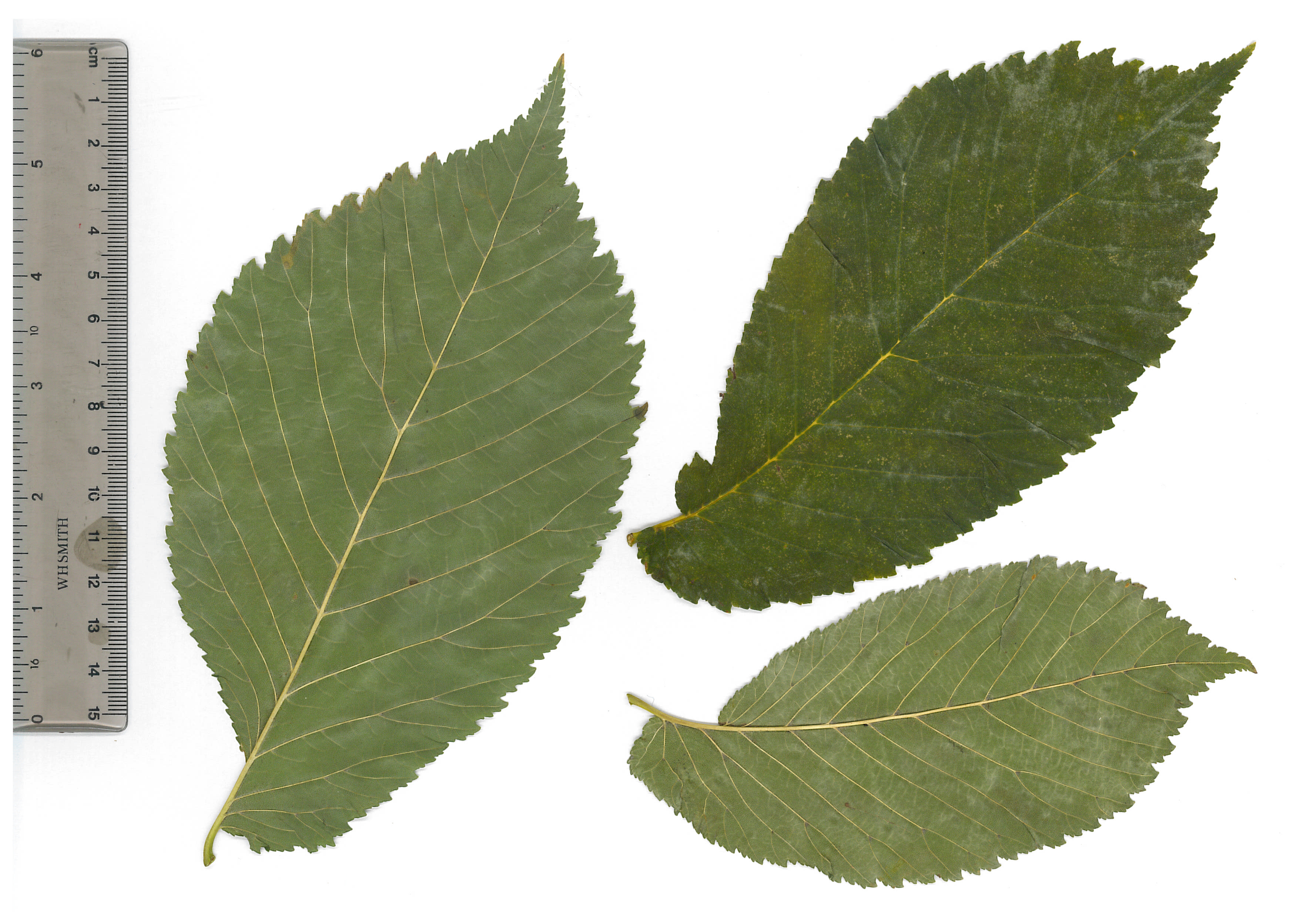
Pressed long-shoot leaves

== Synonymy ==
- Orme de Malines: Gillekens, Éléments d'arboriculture forestière 38, 1891
- Ulmus scabra Mill. latifolia: Möller, Deutsche Gärtner-Zeitung (1901)
