= Ulmus × hollandica 'Belgica' =

Elm cultivar

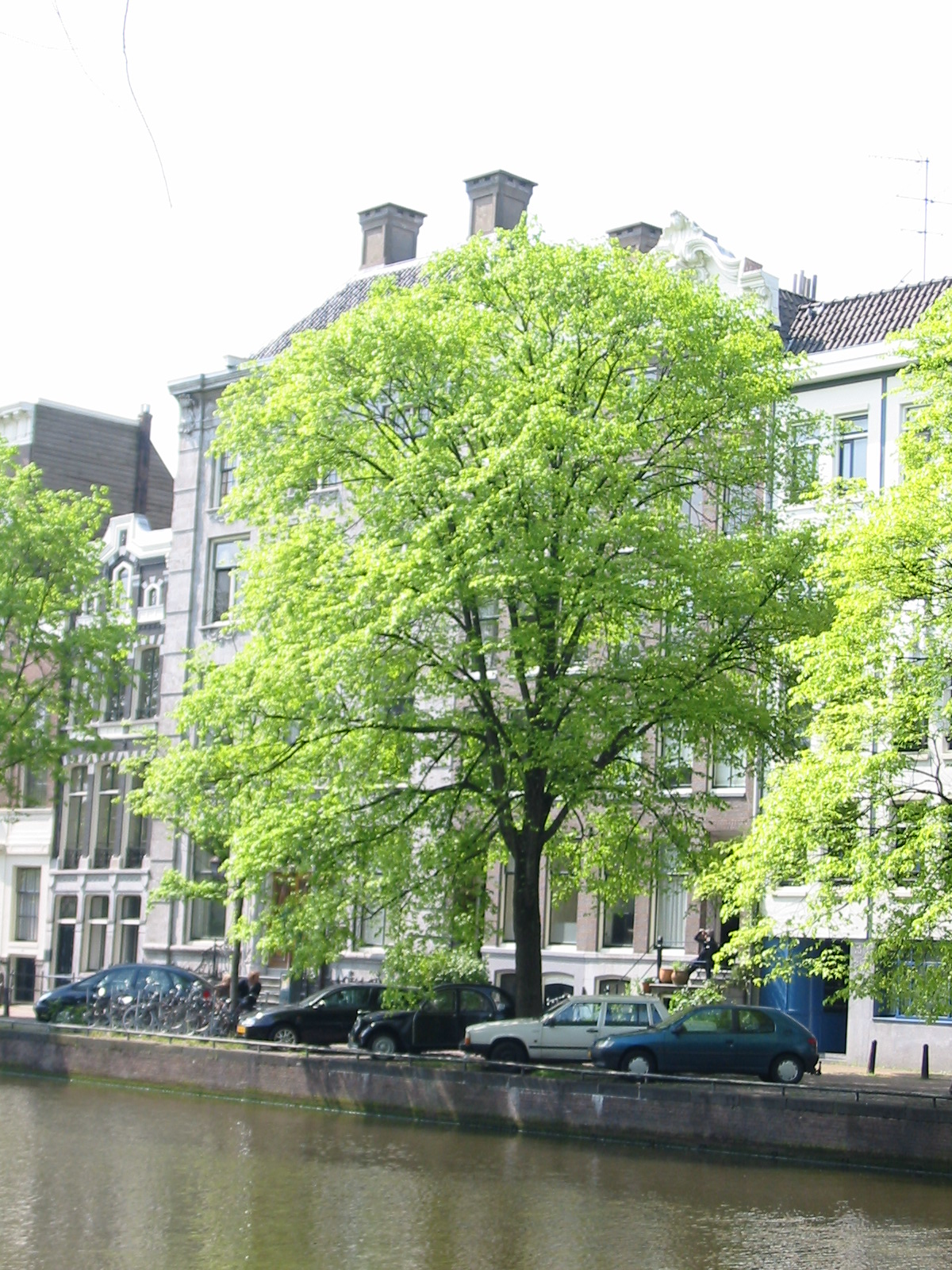
- 'Belgica', Amsterdam (2004)
- Hybrid parentage: U. glabra × U. minor
- Cultivar: 'Belgica'
- Origin: Belgium

The hybrid elm cultivar Ulmus × hollandica 'Belgica', one of a number of hybrids arising from the crossing of Wych Elm (Ulmus glabra) with a variety of Field Elm (Ulmus minor), was reputedly raised in the nurseries of the Abbey of the Dunes (Abdij Ten Duinen), Veurne (later removed to Bruges), in 1694. Popular throughout Belgium and the Netherlands in the 19th century both as an ornamental and as a shelter-belt tree, it was the 'Hollandse iep' (:'Dutch elm') in these countries, as distinct from the tree known as 'Dutch Elm' in Great Britain and Ireland since the 17th century: Ulmus × hollandica 'Major'. In Francophone Belgium it was known as orme gras de Malines.

'Belgica' arose in the same hybridization zone that produced 'Ypreau' (possibly synonymous with 'Major'), 'Klemmer' and 'Dumont', among other elm cultivars.

== Description ==
'Belgica' has a broad crown supported by a straight, rough-barked stem. Unusually thriving on poor sandy soils, it proved one of the fastest-growing elms in Europe, typically achieving heights of < 40 m. The obovate to elliptic leaves are < 12 cm long by 5 cm wide, and terminate at the apex as a long, serrated point. The seed is towards the notch of the samara. 'Belgica' was prized, among other reasons, for its "ease and grace of twigs and foliage".

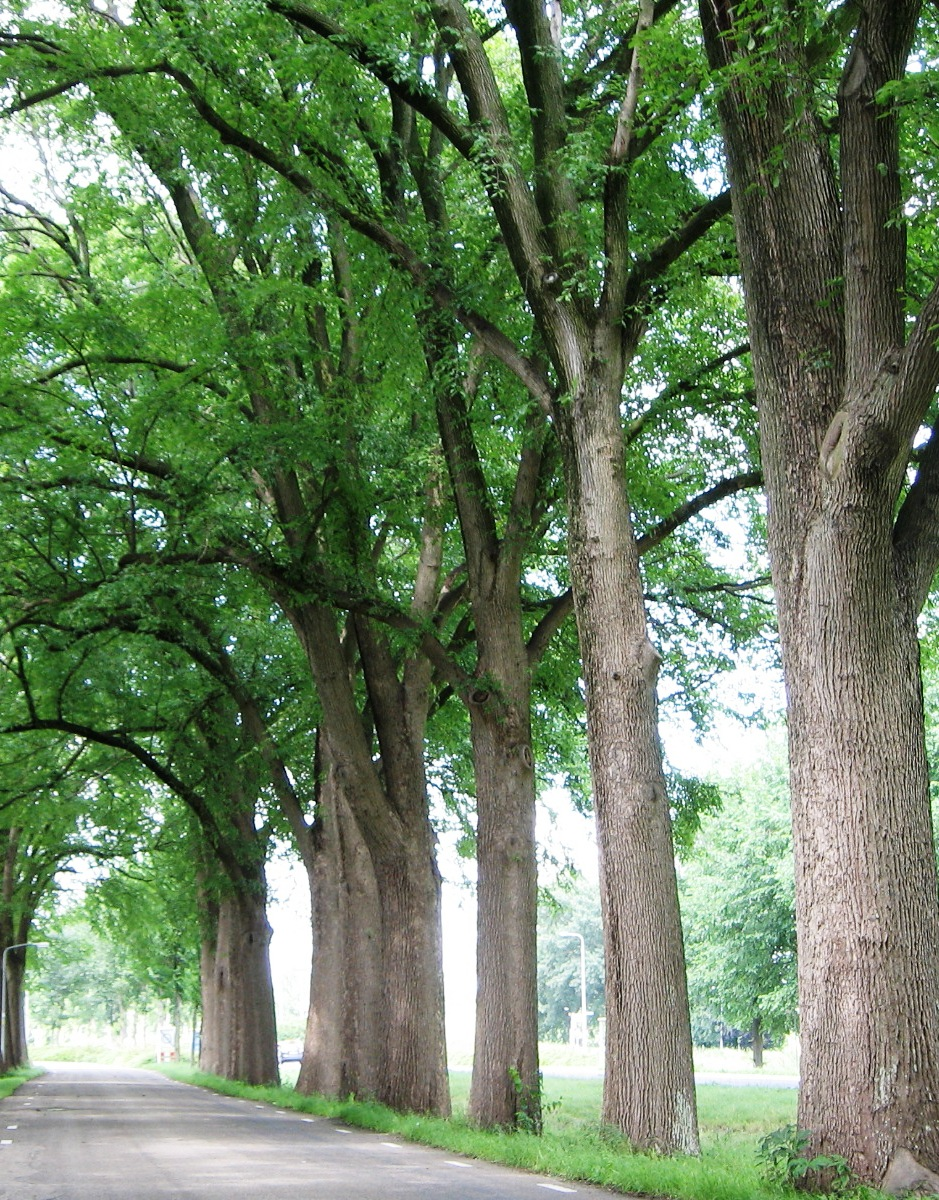
'Belgica' avenue in the Netherlands (2007)

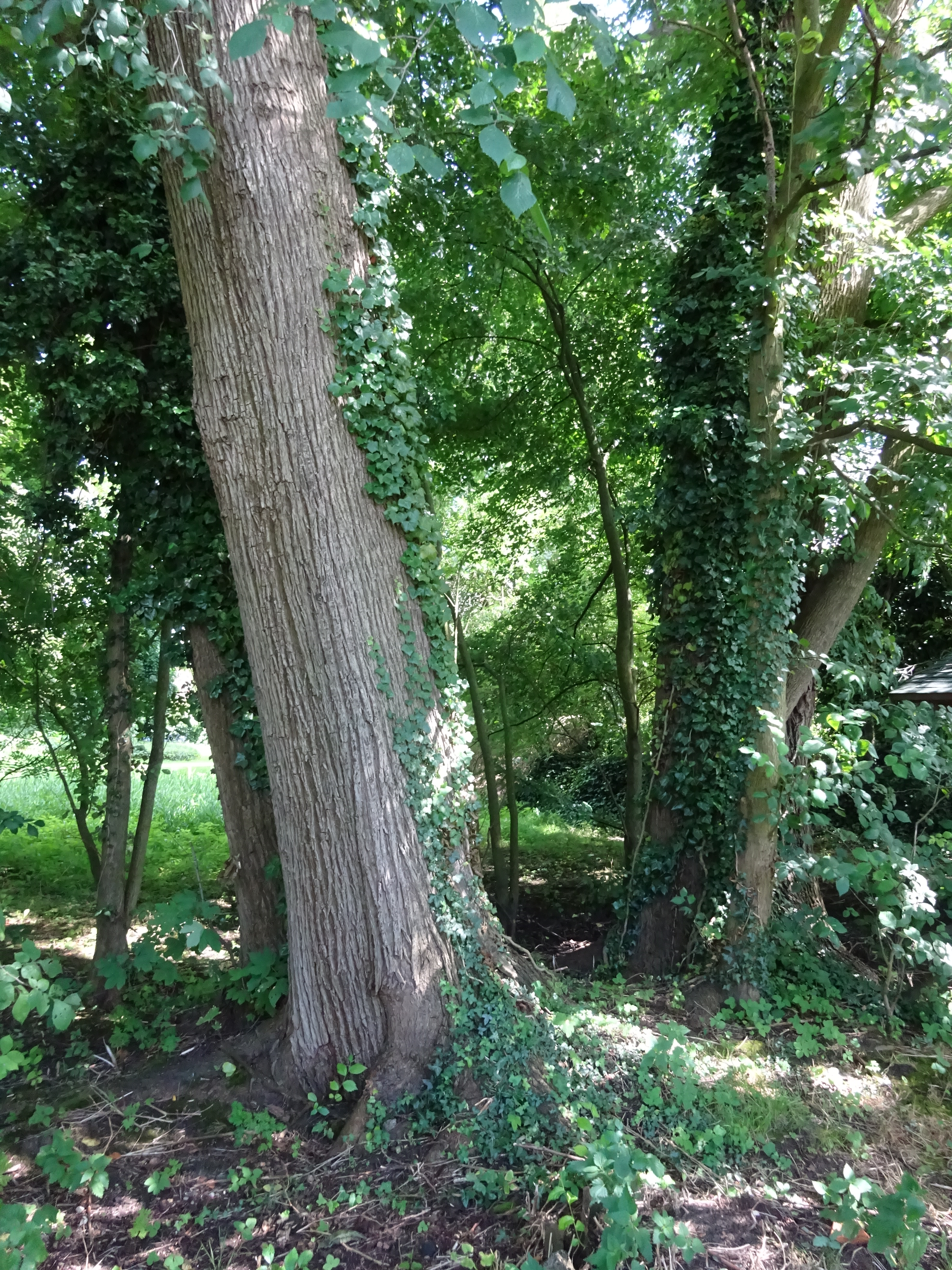
Bole of 'Belgica'

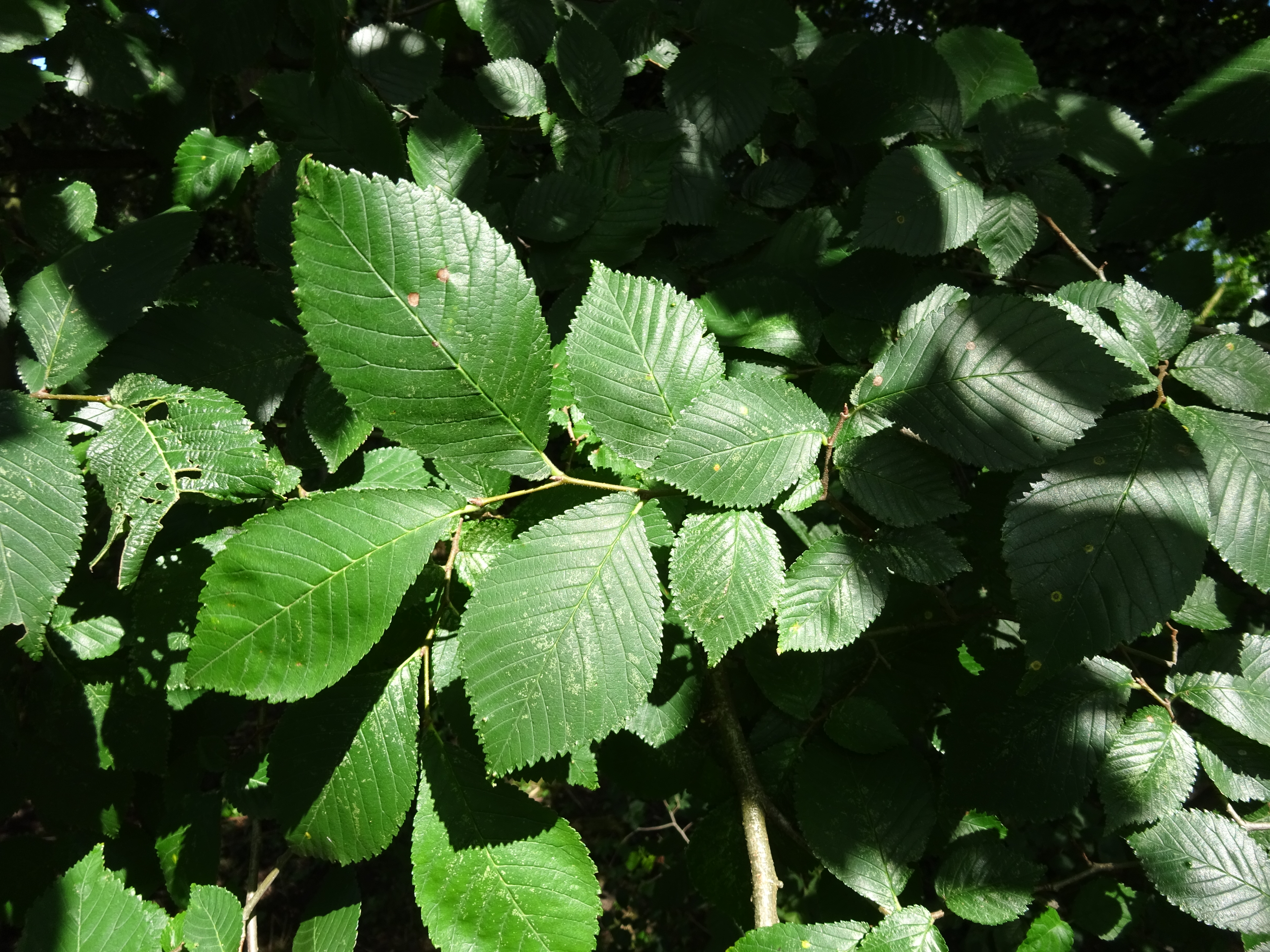
'Belgica' leaves

== Pests and diseases ==
Very susceptible to Dutch elm disease, it was the loss of this particular elm more than any other to the earlier strain of the disease which initiated the Dutch elm breeding programme in 1928. In trials of Dutch clones, past and present, conducted at Wageningen in 2008 and 2009, 'Belgica' exhibited 89% defoliation eight weeks after injection.'Belgica' is also very vulnerable to verticillium wilt.

== Cultivation ==
Usually propagated by ground layering, as it suckers only sparsely if at all, 'Belgica' was planted in great numbers along roads, streets and canals in the Netherlands, and also in squares, parks and gardens. Its popularity and its aesthetic qualities are evidenced in photographic records of the Netherlands from the late 19th century to c.1920. 'Belgica's "rapid growth even on poor soils and its good resistance to wind and atmospheric pollution" made it an ideal choice for shelter-belt planting. Large trees are still present there in smaller numbers, and there are occasional new plantings, such as the five planted in 2018 in ‘s-Gravelandsevaartweg, Loosdrecht, as part of Wijdemeren City Council's elm collection.

The Späth nursery of Berlin supplied an U. montana [× hollandica] belgica to the Dominion Arboretum, Ottawa, Canada in 1896, and one to the Royal Botanic Garden Edinburgh in 1902. In the UK a 'Belgica', "Belgian Elm, a popular continental street tree", was supplied by Hillier & Sons, Winchester, Hampshire, in the mid-20th century, the nursery giving Ulmus × hollandica 'Latifolia' as a synonym. U. Belgica, 'Belgian Elm', "of rapid growth and fine spreading shape", appears from the 1870s in the catalogues of the Mount Hope Nursery (also known as Ellwanger and Barry) of Rochester, New York, and later in the catalogues of Kelsey's, New York. The cultivar has been introduced to arboreta in North America (see under Accessions). Young specimens were said to be "flourishing" in Arnold Arboretum in 1915. There is no record of its introduction to Australasia.

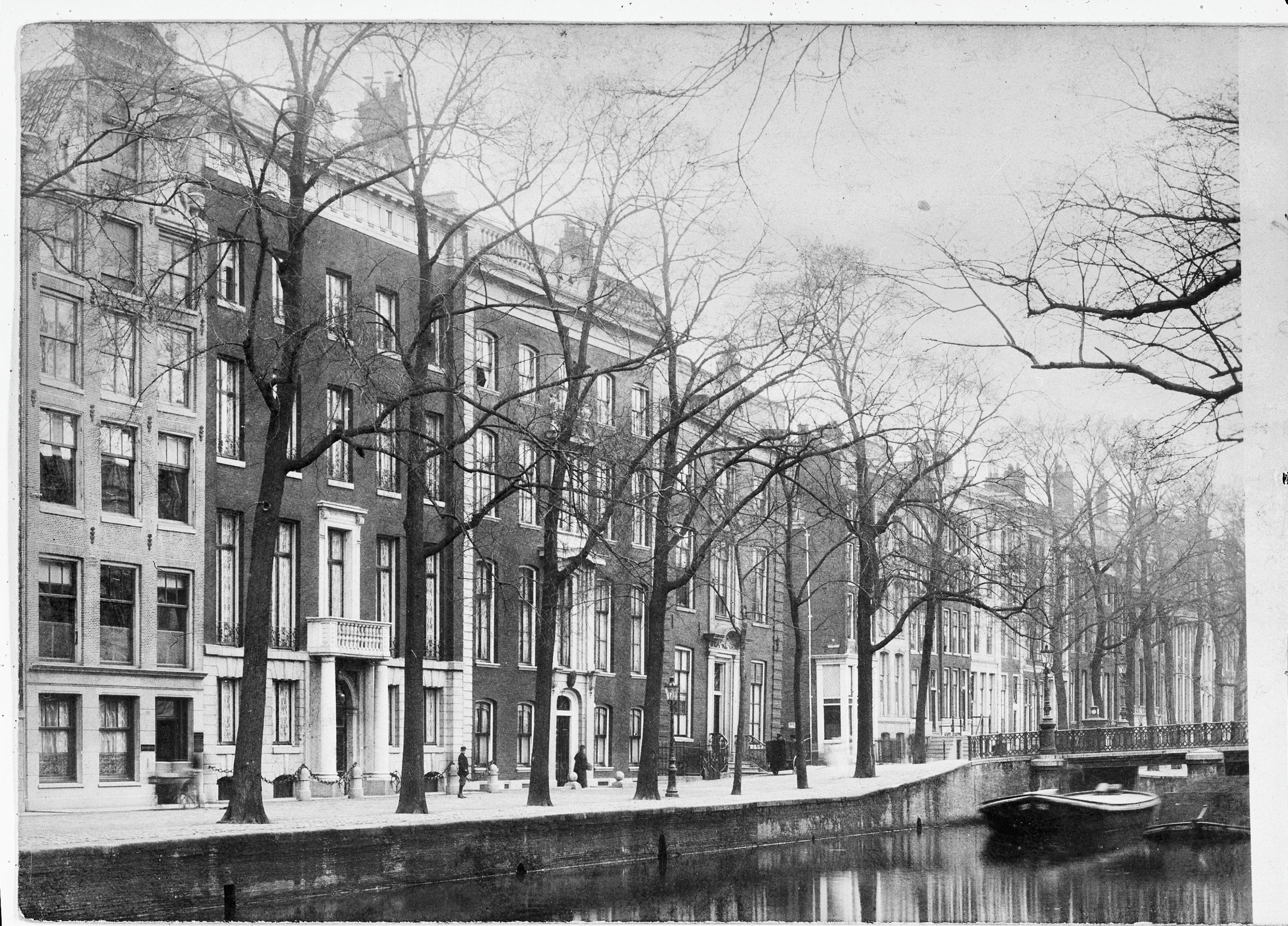
'Belgica', Heerengracht, Amsterdam (1902)

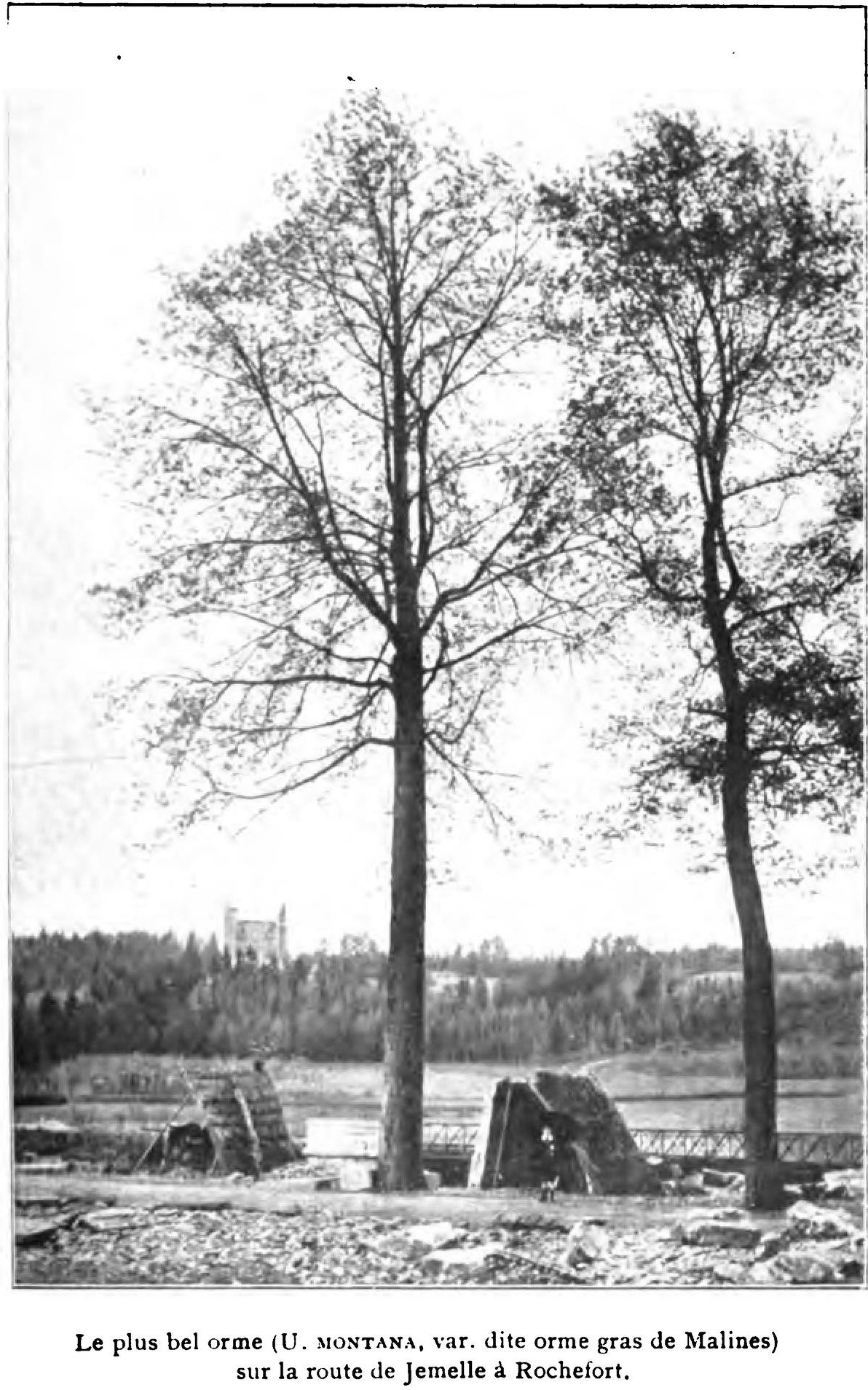
'Belgica' near Rochefort, Belgium (1904), 9 feet (2.7 m) in girth at 48 years

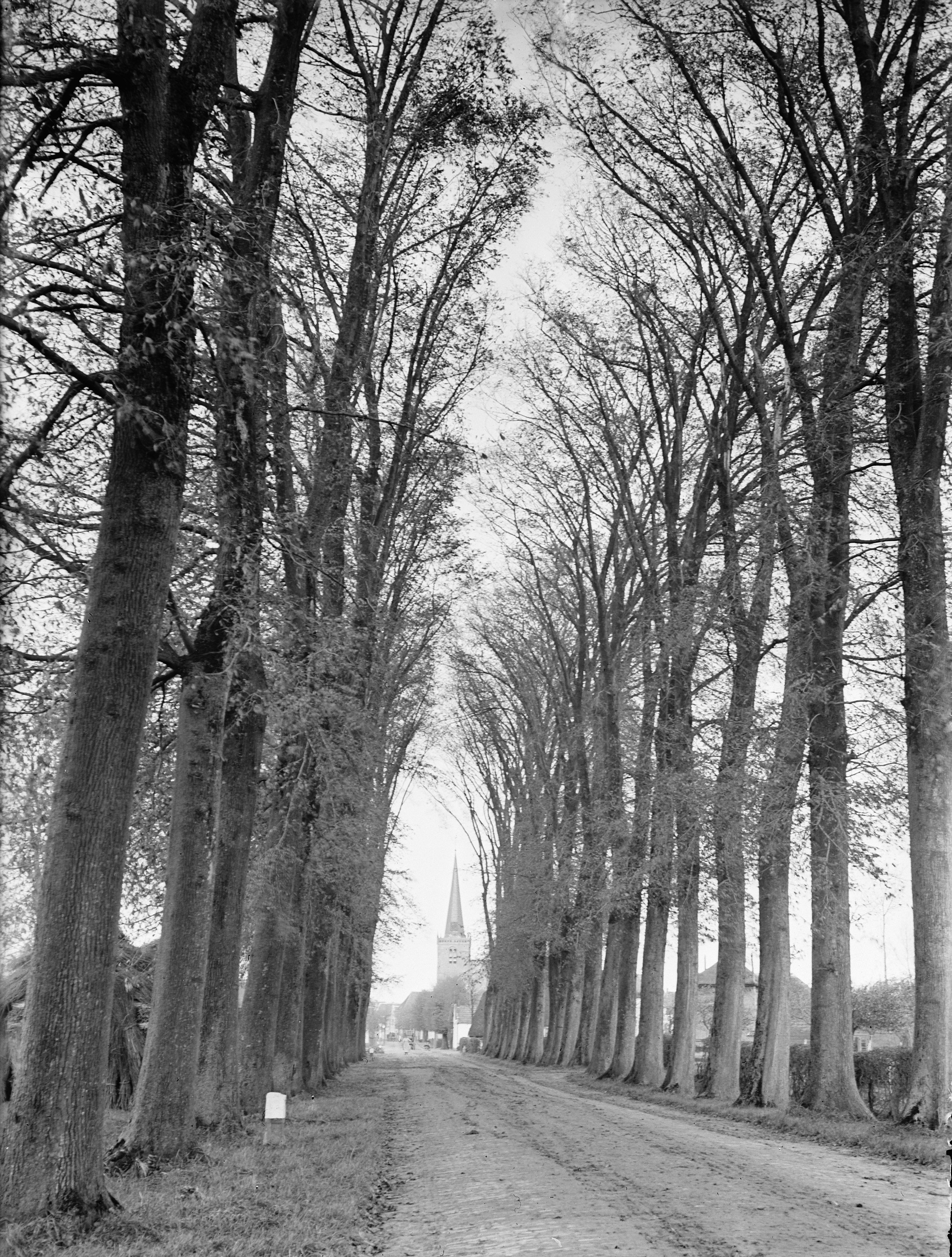
'Belgica' avenue, the Netherlands

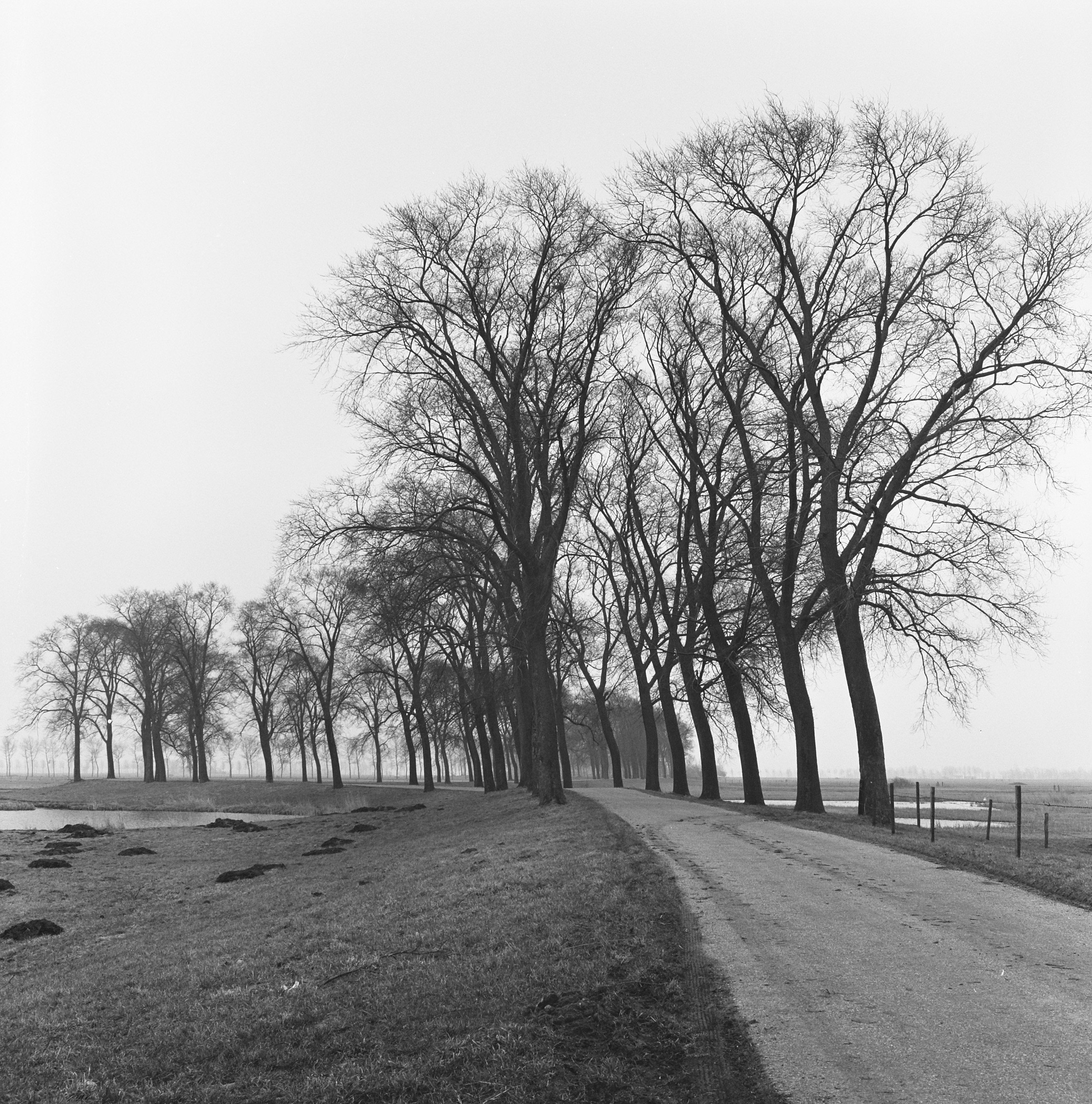
'Belgica', Kampernieuwstad, the Netherlands (1968)

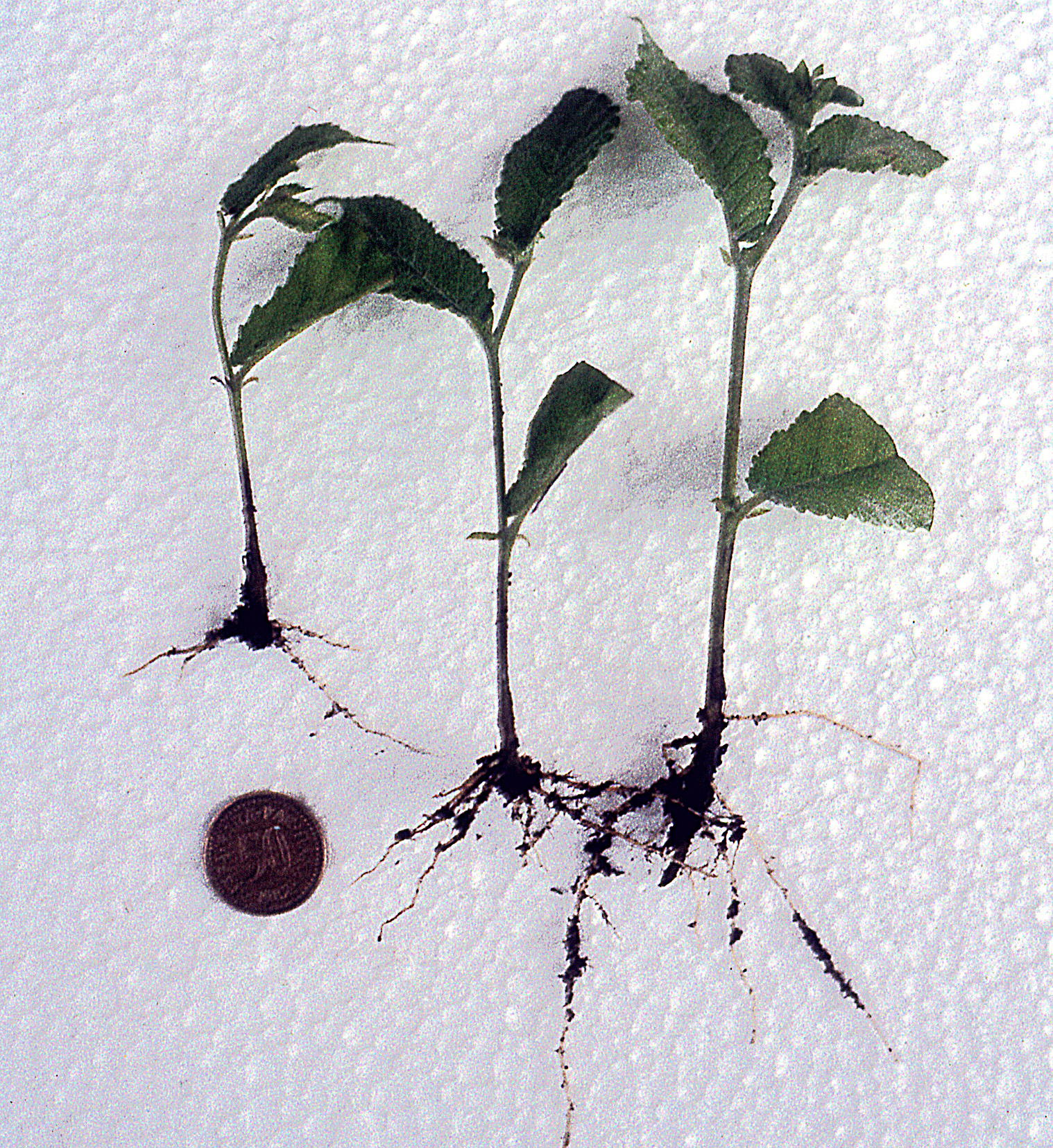
Rooted 'Belgica' cuttings

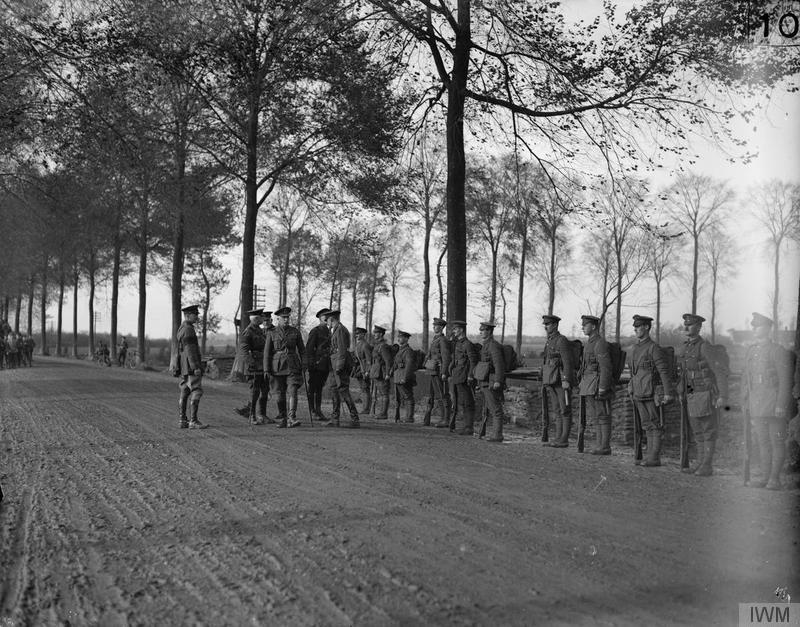
'Belgica' avenue near Vlamertinghe, September 1916

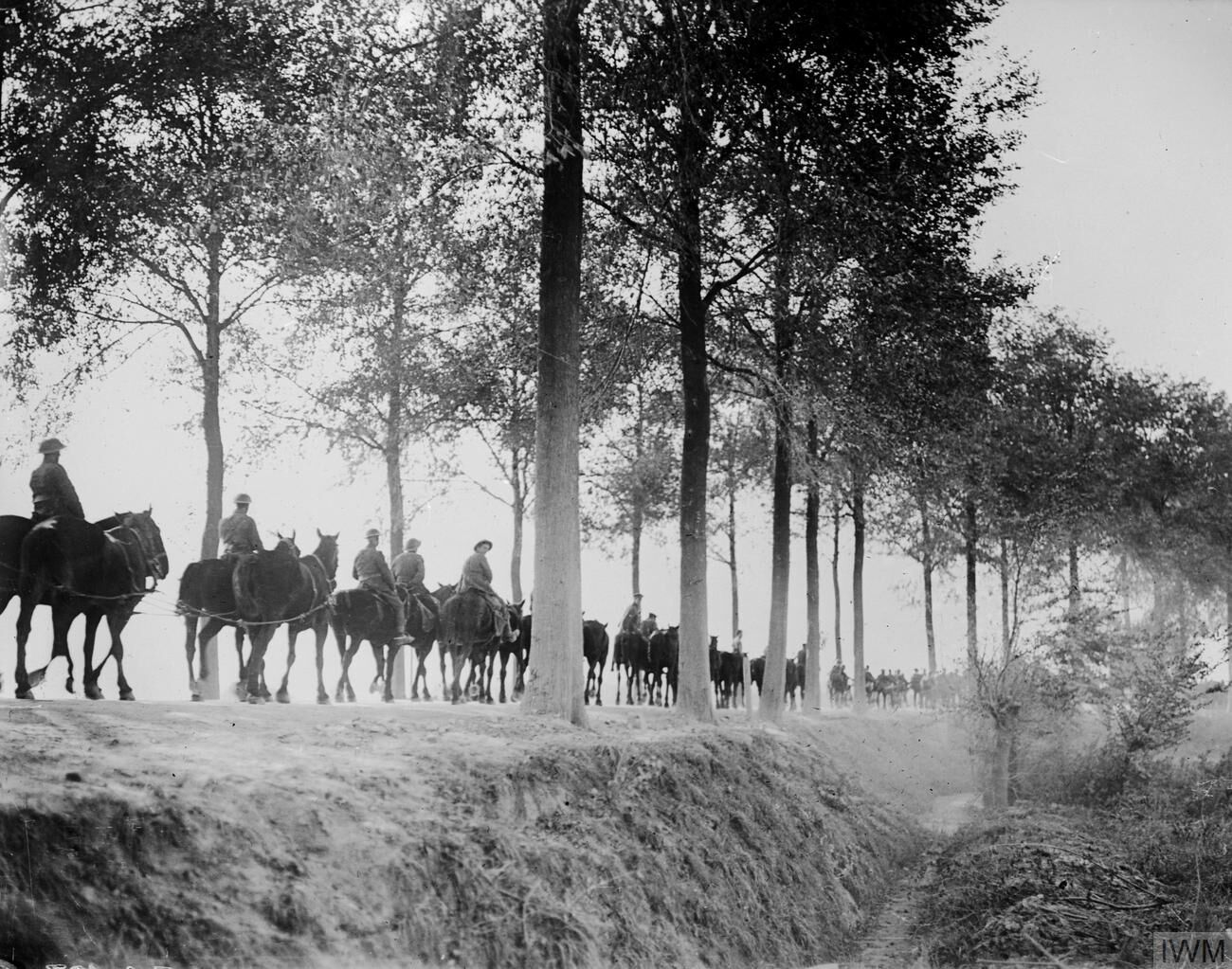
'Belgica' avenue near Ypres, 1917

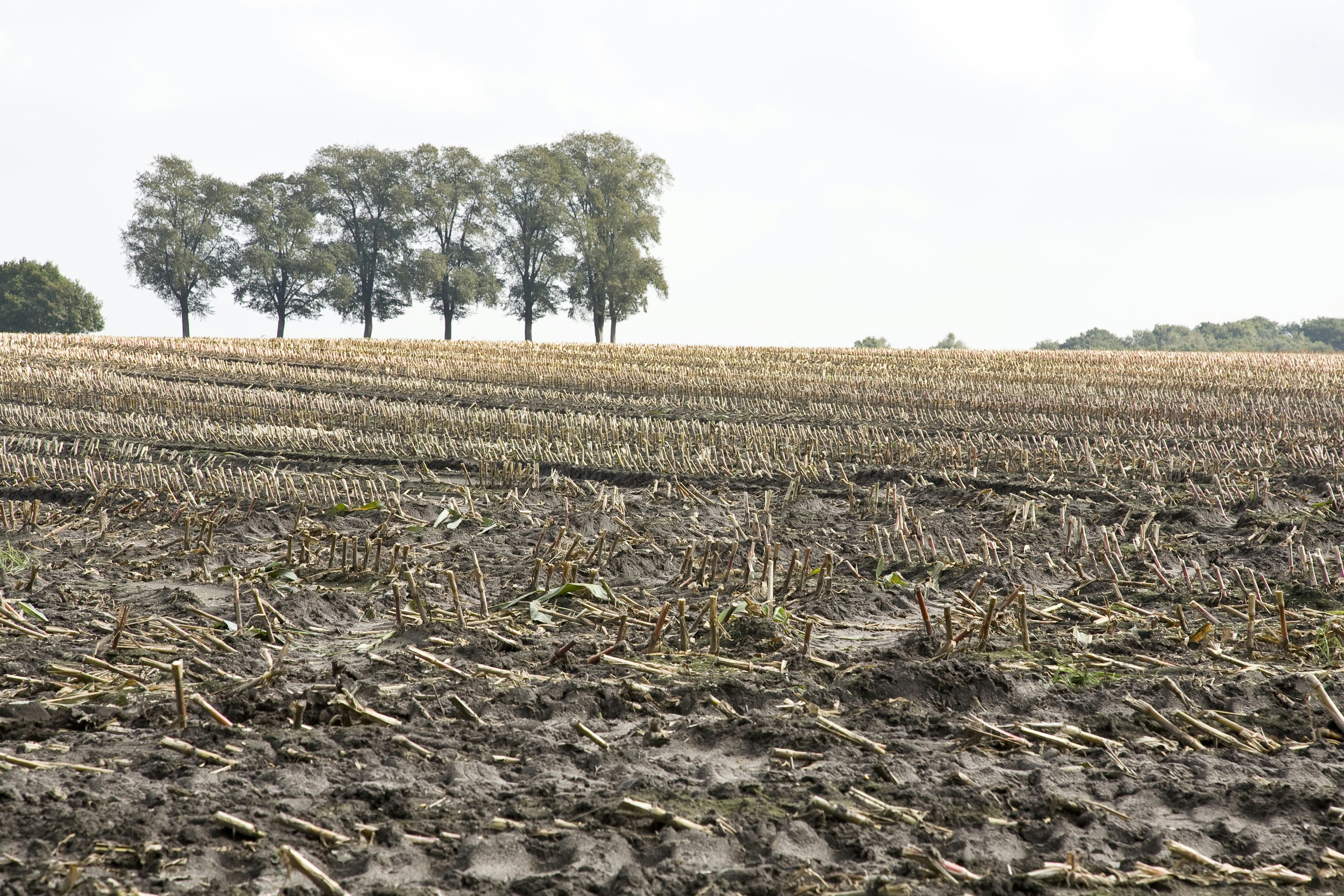
Survivors of a Belgicalaan [:'Belgica' lane], near Balloo, Drenthe (2007)

== Notable trees ==
The Oudemanhuispoort 'Belgica' in Amsterdam, planted in 1895, is the largest elm in the Netherlands, with a height of 34.6 m and a girth of 4.4 m. The UK TROBI champion tree grows at Dyke Park Road in Brighton, measuring 17 m high by 92 cm d.b.h. in 2009, one of nine trees forming part of the NCCPG Collection (see under Accessions).

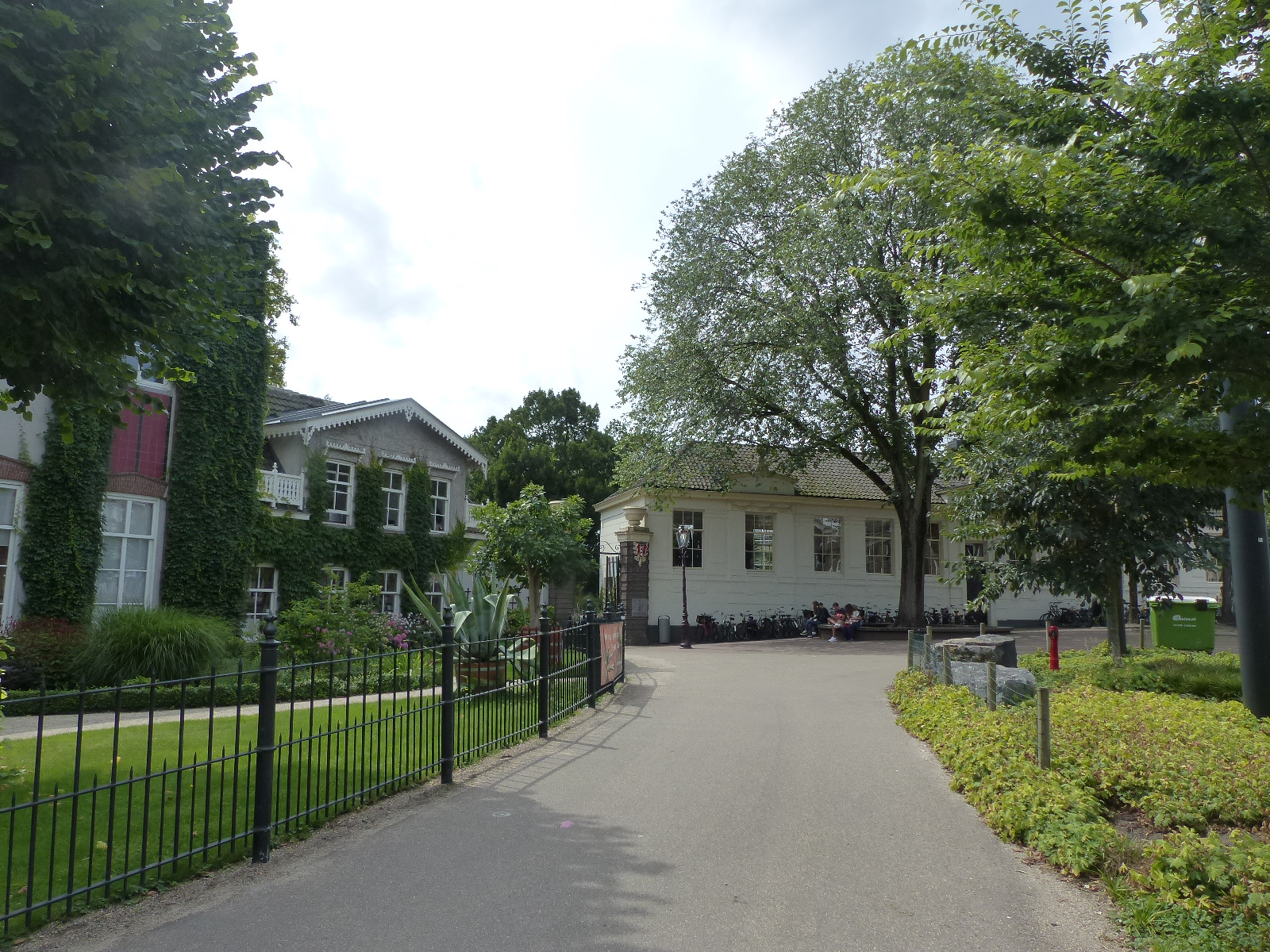
The 120 year-old 'Belgica' outside the Hortus Botanicus, Amsterdam (2019), felled by a storm in 2023.

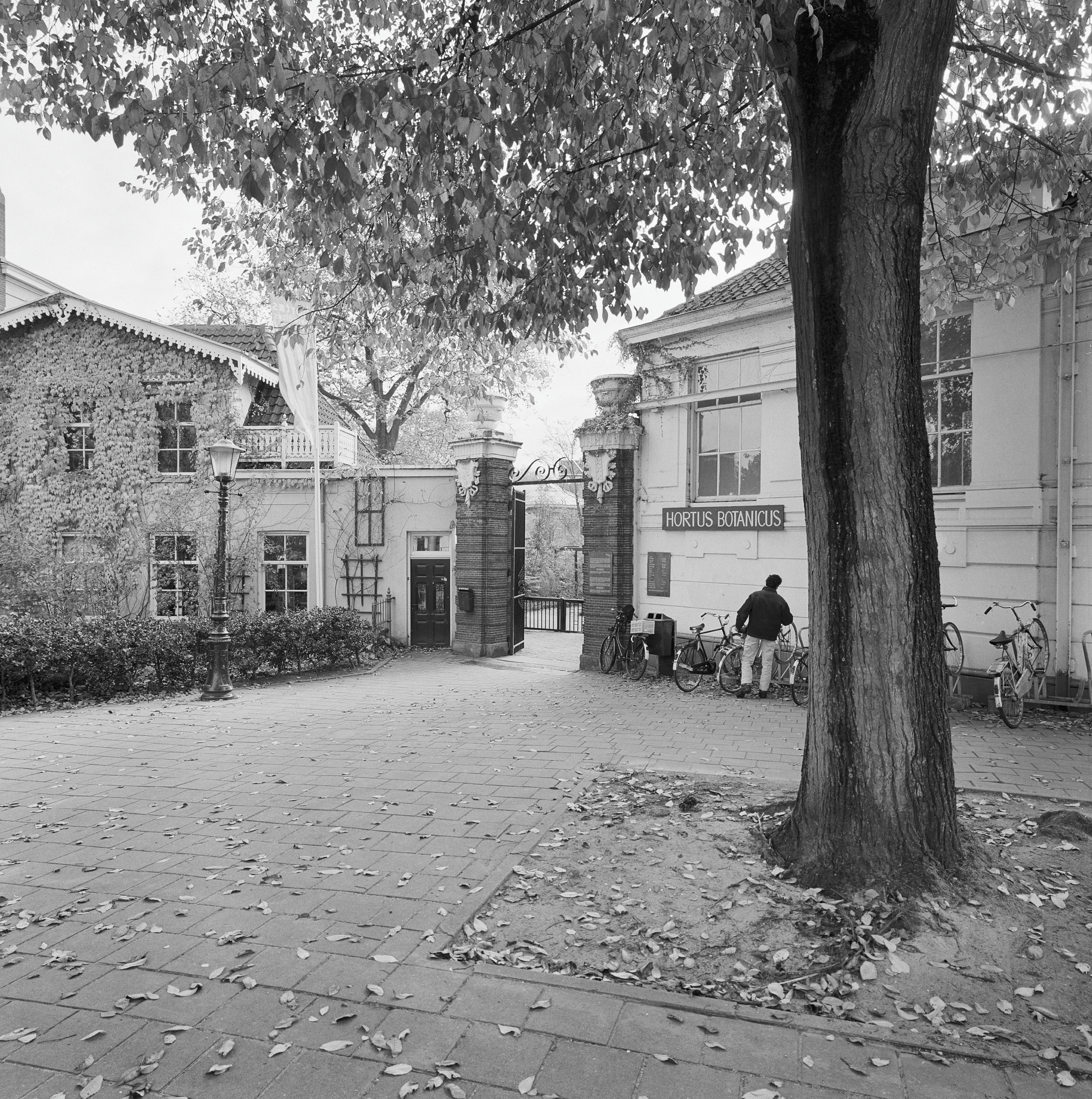
Same, 2001

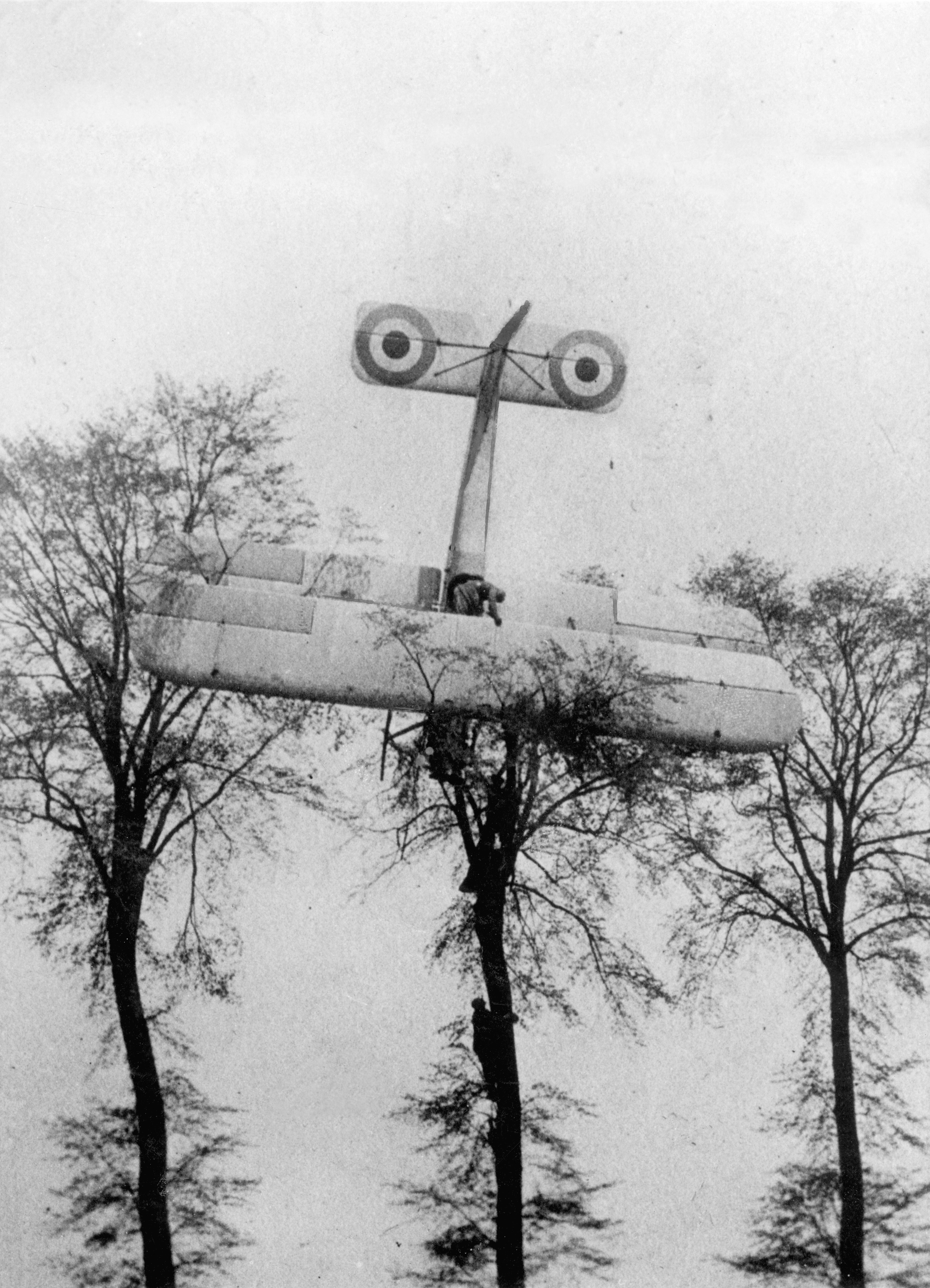
French pilot saved by three 'Belgica', 1915

== In art ==
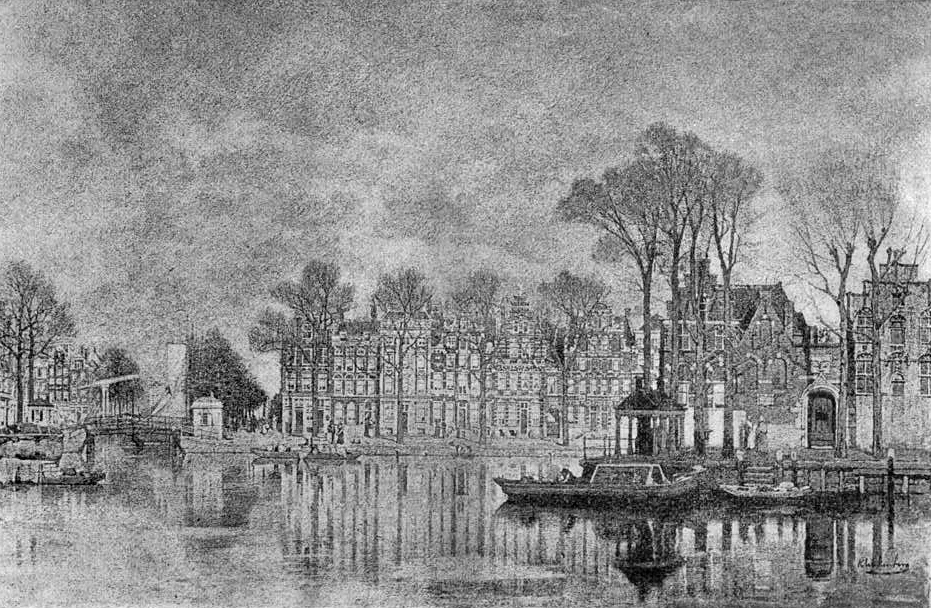
Johannes Karel Christiaan Klinkenberg, 'Amsterdam' [1890], with 'Belgica' elms

The columnar boles, high-arching branches and graceful foliage of 'Belgica' elms ('Hollandse iepen') beside canals and streets in the Netherlands are celebrated in many of the paintings and drawings of the Dutch artist Karel Klinkenberg (1852–1924).

== Synonymy ==
- Ulmus batavina: Koch, Dendrologie; Bäume, Sträucher und Halbsträucher, welche in Mittel- und Nord- Europa im Freien kultivirt werden 2 (1): 414 1872.
- Ulmus belgica: Weston, The English flora 46. 1775.
- Ulmus campestris (: minor) bataviana: Simon-Louis, Metz, France. Catalogue, 1869.
- Ulmus montana var. belgica: Späth list, 1902
- Ulmus × hollandica var. belgica

== Hybrid cultivars ==
- 'Den Haag' (Ulmus pumila × Ulmus × hollandica 'Belgica'), raised in the Netherlands in 1936.

An unnamed cultivar of the same parentage stood in Zuiderpark, The Hague, in the mid-20th century.

== Varieties ==
Augustine Henry considered the once widely planted elm cultivar U. × hollandica 'Dumont' to be a variety of 'Belgica', calling it Ulmus belgica var. Dumontii.

== Accessions ==
North America

- Arnold Arboretum, US. Acc. no. 322–81
- Longwood Gardens, US. Acc. no. 1967–0877
- Morton Arboretum, US. Acc. no. 1457–24

Europe

- Brighton & Hove City Council, UK. NCCPG Elm Collection. Examples planted at Dudeney Lodge, Dyke Road Park and Donald Hall Road.
- Grange Farm Arboretum, Lincolnshire, UK. Acc. no. 1145.

== Nurseries ==
- Coles Nurseries, Thurnby, Leicester, UK.
- Noordplant , Glimmen, Netherlands.
