= Ulmus × hollandica 'Klemmer' =

Elm cultivar

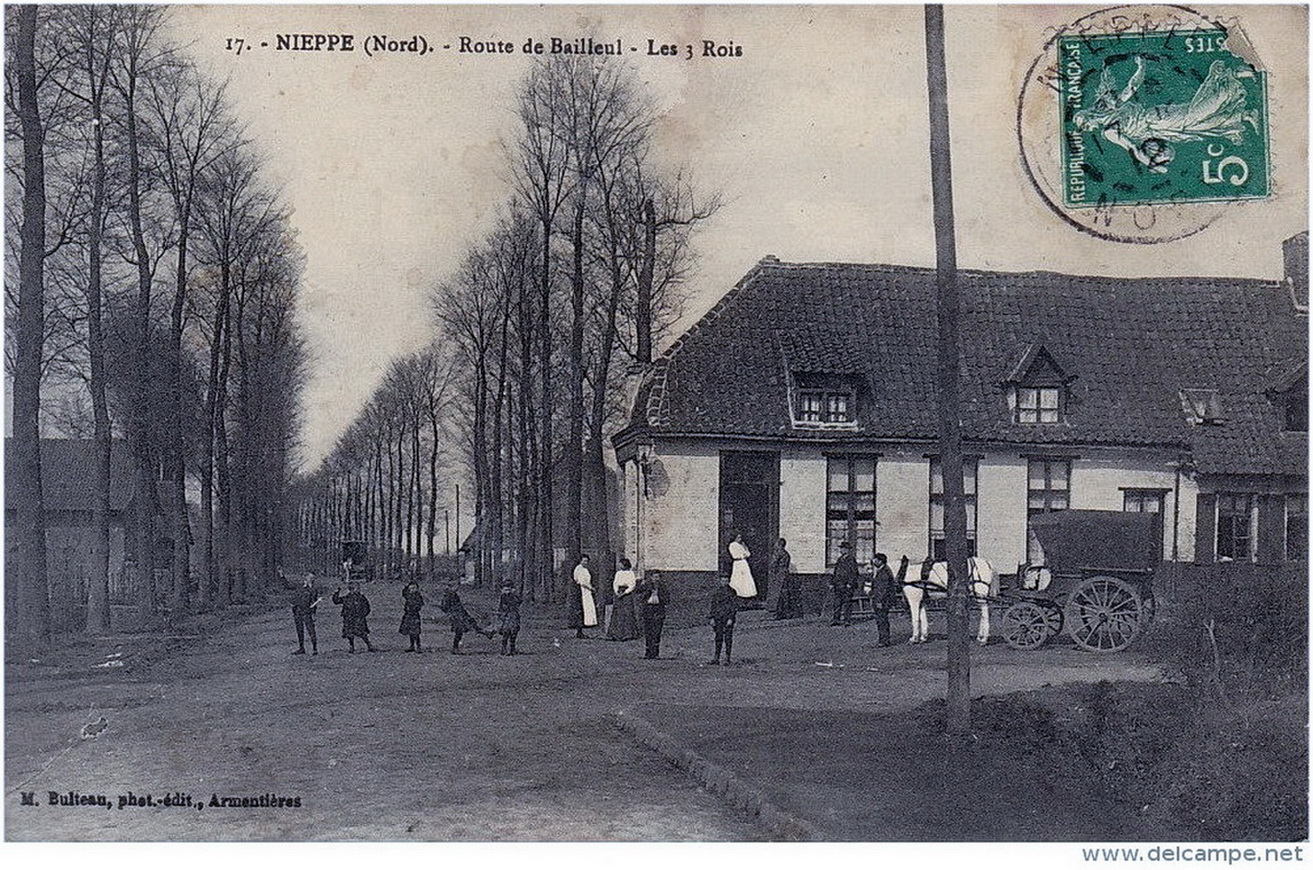
- 'Klemmer' avenue, Nieppe, Département du Nord, France (1912)
- Hybrid parentage: U. glabra × U. minor
- Cultivar: 'Klemmer'
- Origin: Belgium

Ulmus × hollandica 'Klemmer', or Flanders Elm, is probably one of a number of hybrids arising from the crossing of Wych Elm (Ulmus glabra) with a variety of Field Elm (Ulmus minor), making it a variety of Ulmus × hollandica. Originating in the Bruges area, it was described by Gillekens in 1891 as l'orme champêtre des Flandres in a paper which noted its local name, klemmer, and its rapid growth in an 1878–91 trial. Kew, Henry (1913), and Krüssmann (1976) listed it as an Ulmus × hollandica cultivar, though Henry noted its "similarity in some respects" to field elm Ulmus minor, while Green went as far as to regard it as "possibly U. carpinifolia" (:minor).

== Etymology ==
The name 'Klemmer' derives from the Flemish for 'climber', a reference to the tree's rapid growth and lofty height. Klemmeri, used by the Späth nursery among others, is a misnomer, incorrectly implying a proper noun Klemmer.

Not to be confused with 'Klehmii', a cultivar of Ulmus americana named for Charles Klehm, an Illinois nurseryman.

== Description ==
'Klemmer' is a tall, fast growing tree, with a straight cylindrical stem and ascending branches, initially forming a narrow, conical or pyramidal head which later broadens, and producing numerous root-suckers and some epicormic shoots. The bark, smooth in young trees, is later fissured, forming irregular 'scales' in mature specimens. The leaves, their upper surface middle green, are ovate, up to 7.5 cm (3 in) long (Krüssmann says up to 10 cm) and up to 5.0 cm (2 in) broad, shortly acuminate at the apex, scabrous and glabrescent, the margins slightly crispate. (F. J. Fontaine likened the leaves to "the fairly narrow light green leaves of 'Superba', but with a somewhat rougher upper surface".) The petiole is 1 to 1.5 cm long in canopy leaves. The seed is situated close to the notch of the samara. The timber is reddish in hue, strong but liable to warping. Feneau noted (1902) that young trees were susceptible to frost damage.

'Klemmer' foliage, Kew, before 1976

== Pests and diseases ==
'Klemmer' has no significant resistance to Dutch elm disease.

== Cultivation ==
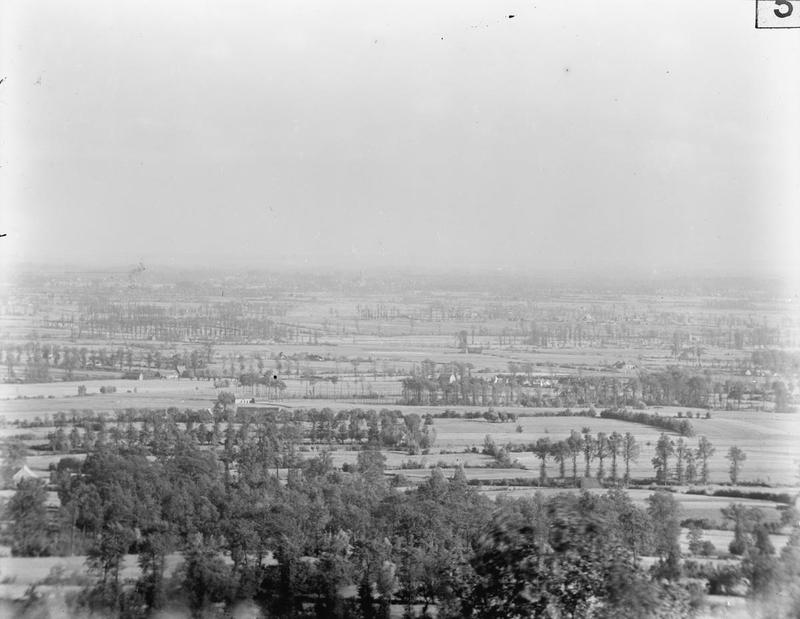
Landscape near Bailleul, where lines of 'Klemmer' were present in the early 20th century (c.1915)

Common in western Flanders by the 1880s, before World War I and the first Dutch elm disease epidemic, 'Klemmer' was widely supplied and planted in avenues across Belgium and in the Département du Nord, France, where it was much esteemed for its timber and rapid growth, and where it was considered suitable for street planting because of its narrow form. Nanot (1885) and Aigret (1905) reported it as planted in the environs of Paris. F. J. Fontaine noted in 1968 that 'Klemmer', owing to Dutch elm disease, "occurs rarely or no longer in nurseries in Belgium, but is still used in northern France alongside the 'Dumont' elm, though to a lesser extent". Ulmus hollandica klemmeri was present in The Hague and Utrecht in the 1930s.

The tree was introduced to the USA c.1871, appearing as U. campestris Clemmerii, "a tree of fine form, much used in Belgium for planting along avenues", in the catalogues of the Mount Hope Nursery (also known as Ellwanger and Barry) of Rochester, New York. The Späth nursery of Berlin supplied an U. campestris Clemmeri to the Dominion Arboretum, Ottawa, Canada, in 1893. By his 1903 catalogue Späth had renamed the cultivar U. Klemmeri, suggesting doubts about its botanical status.

Kew had two specimens, obtained in 1908 from the French nursery, Barbier Frères; one was still present in the late 1970s. S. G. A. Doorenbos, Director of The Hague Parks Department from 1927, introduced 'Klemmer', sourced from Kew, to Belmonte Arboretum, Wageningen in the early 1930s. Apart from the Wakehurst Place hedging specimen (see 'Notable trees'), no 'Klemmer' are known to survive in the UK. In 2025 Brighton and Hove Council listed by this name, without provenance or identification information, an elm in Royal Pavilion Gardens lacking the distinctive straight stem and narrow profile of 'Klemmer'.

== Notable trees ==
One of two specimens obtained in 1908 from the Barbier Nursery, France, by the Royal Botanic Gardens Kew survives at Wakehurst Place, maintained as a hedging plant, too low to attract the attention of Scolytus beetles. In the US, three 'Klemmer' elms, sourced from Arnold Arboretum, survive (2018) at the Morton Arboretum, Illinois.

== The Ladywell Fields elm ==
A large European White Elm Ulmus laevis (identity confirmed by dendrologist Owen Johnson from its distinctive fruit) growing in the Ladywell Fields public park in Lewisham, London, was misidentified in 1997 as a 'Klemmer' Dutch elm. An information board, erected in front of the tree by Lewisham Council, bears (2025) the erroneous name and depicts another tree (one of the Morton Arboretum 'Klemmer'), but correctly shows the specimen's pedunculate White Elm fruit, differing from the sessile fruit of Dutch elm.

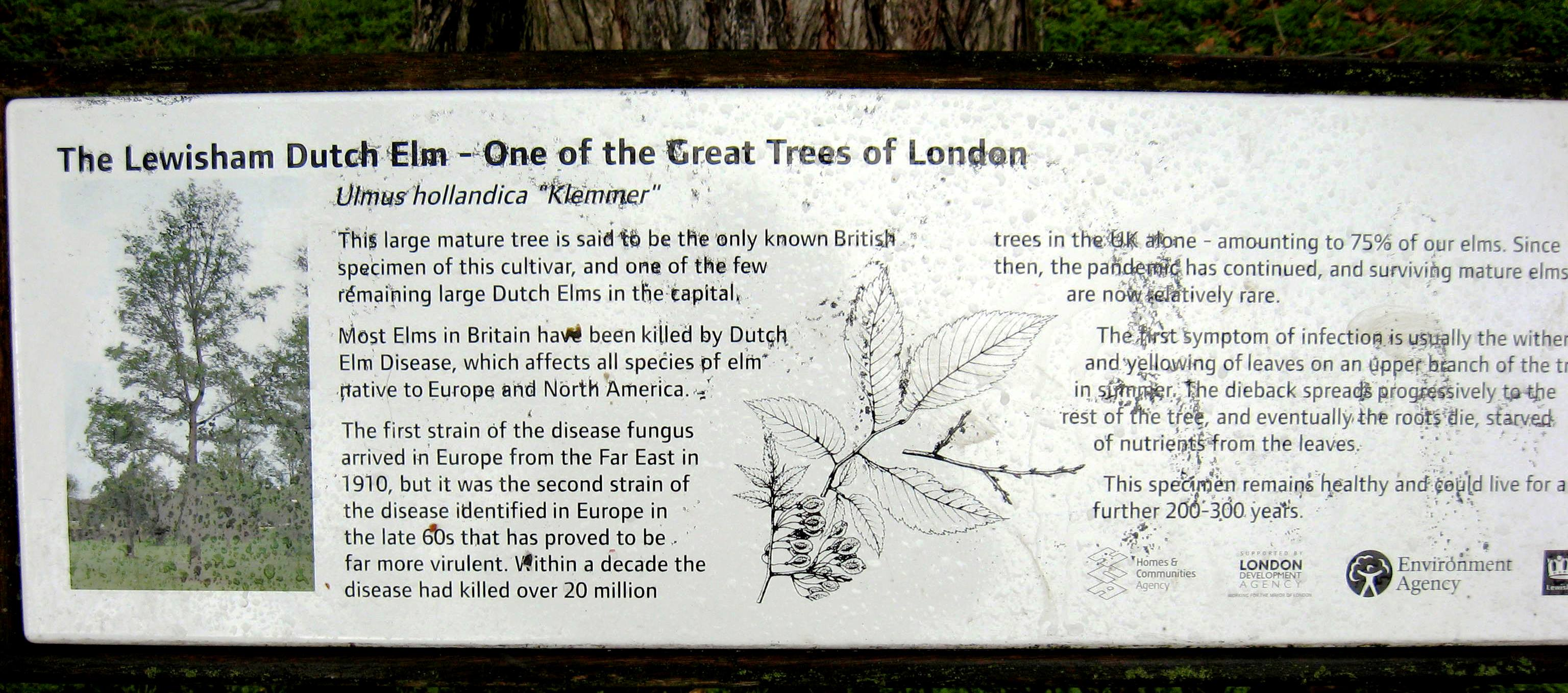
Noticeboard in Ladywell Fields, Lewisham, showing the Morton Arboretum 'Klemmer' and erroneously naming the Lewisham Elm, an U. laevis, as a Dutch elm

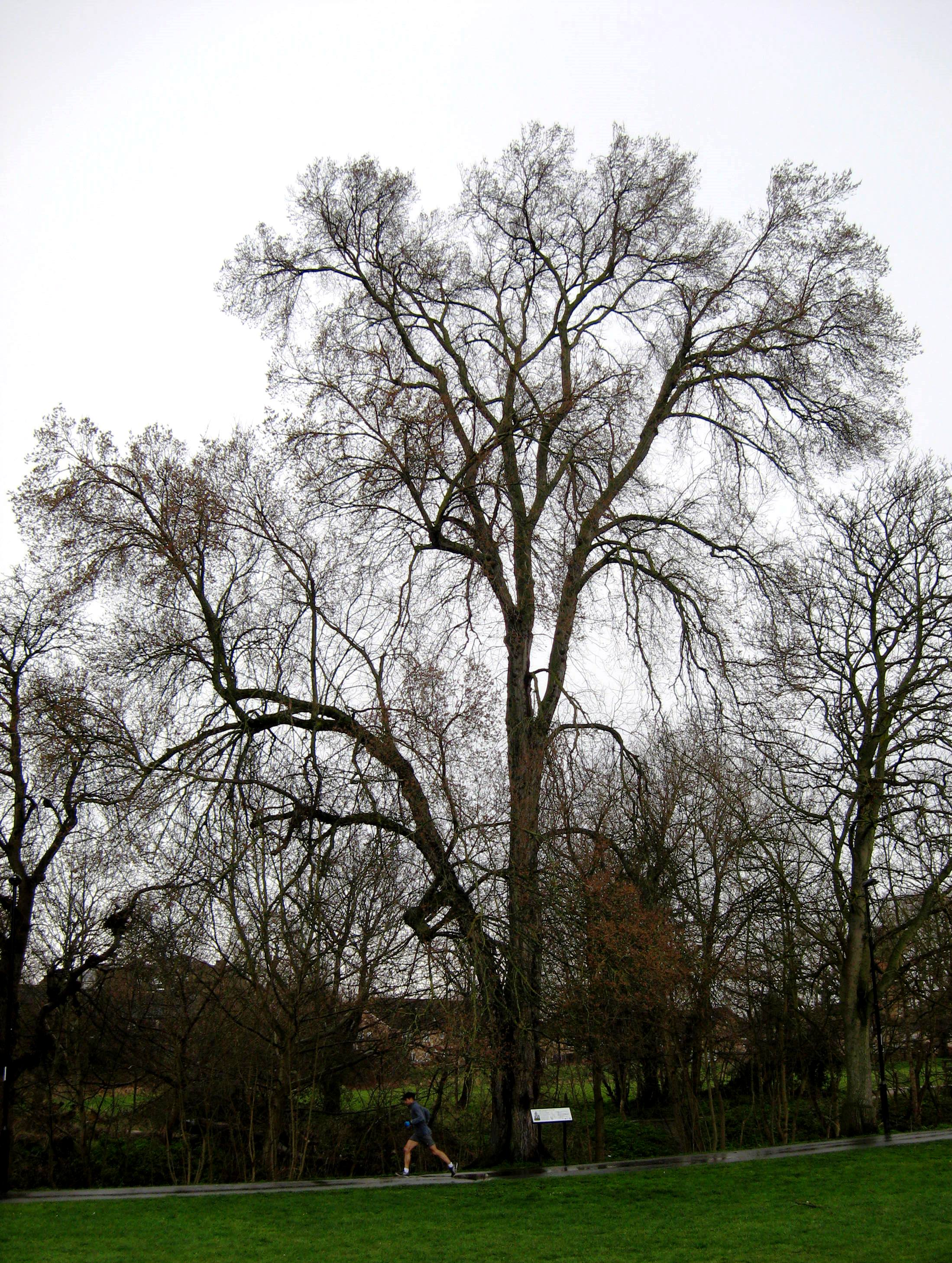
The Ladywell Fields elm (U. laevis), 2018

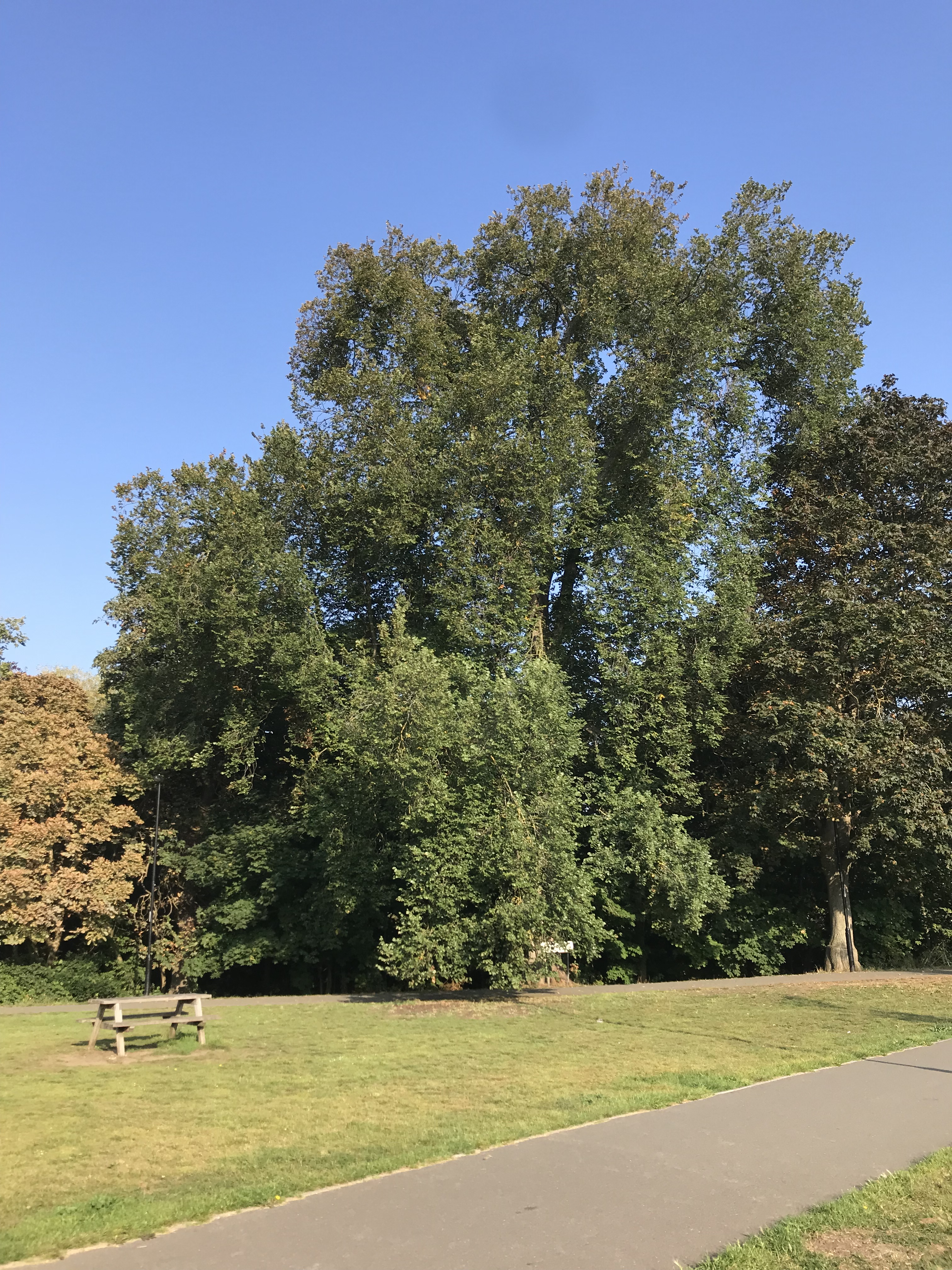
The Ladywell Fields elm (U. laevis), 2023

== Synonymy ==
- l'orme champêtre klemmer: Gillekens, Éléments d'arboriculture forestière 41, 1891
- 'Klemmer Rouge': Feneau.
- Ulmus campestris (: minor) var. Clemmeri: Lavallée Arboretum Segrezianum. 235, 1877.
- Ulmus klemeri: Späth nursery, Berlin, 1900.

== Accessions ==
=== North America ===
- Morton Arboretum, US. Acc. no. 535–49 3 trees, sourced from Arnold Arboretum.

=== Europe ===
- Wakehurst Place Garden Wakehurst Place, UK. Acc. no. 1908–14108
