= Balloo =

Balloo may refer to:

- Balloo, County Down, a small village in County Down, Northern Ireland
- Balloo, County Antrim, a townland in County Antrim, Northern Ireland
- Balloo, Netherlands, a village in the northeast Netherlands

== See also ==
- Baloo, a fictional bear in Rudyard Kipling's The Jungle Book
