= Léopold Guillaume Gillekens =

Léopold Guillaume Gillekens (11 October 1833, Sint-Pieters-Leeuw – 2 October 1905, Vilvoorde) was a Belgian horticulturalist.

Gillekens is known for his work in the fields of pomology and arboriculture. From 1867, he served as director of the Ecole d'horticulture de l'Etat à Vilvorde. He was publisher of the journal Moniteur horticole belge.

== Written works ==
- Traité de la taille et de la culture des arbres fruitiers, 1878 - Treatise on the size and culture of fruit trees.
- Éléments d'arboriculture forestière, 1891 - Aspects of forest arboriculture.
- Cours pratique de culture maraichère, 1895 - Practical course on vegetable gardening.
