= Ulmus × hollandica 'Dumont' =

Elm cultivar

- Hybrid parentage: U. glabra × U. minor
- Cultivar: 'Dumont'
- Origin: Belgium

The hybrid elm cultivar Ulmus × hollandica 'Dumont' was a very vigorous elm raised from a tree discovered by a gardener on the estate of M. Dumont at Tournay, Belgium, c. 1865.

== Description ==
The tree had a straight trunk and a narrow regular, pyramidal crown, Elwes likening it to Wheatley Elm in habit. F. J. Fontaine, however, stated (1968) that its habit resembled that of 'Belgica', but was more upright, forming a smaller crown. He added that the habit was more irregular than that of the 'Vegeta'. The leaves were somewhat smaller than those of 'Belgica'.

== Pests and diseases ==
'Dumont' was very susceptible to Dutch elm disease.

== Cultivation ==
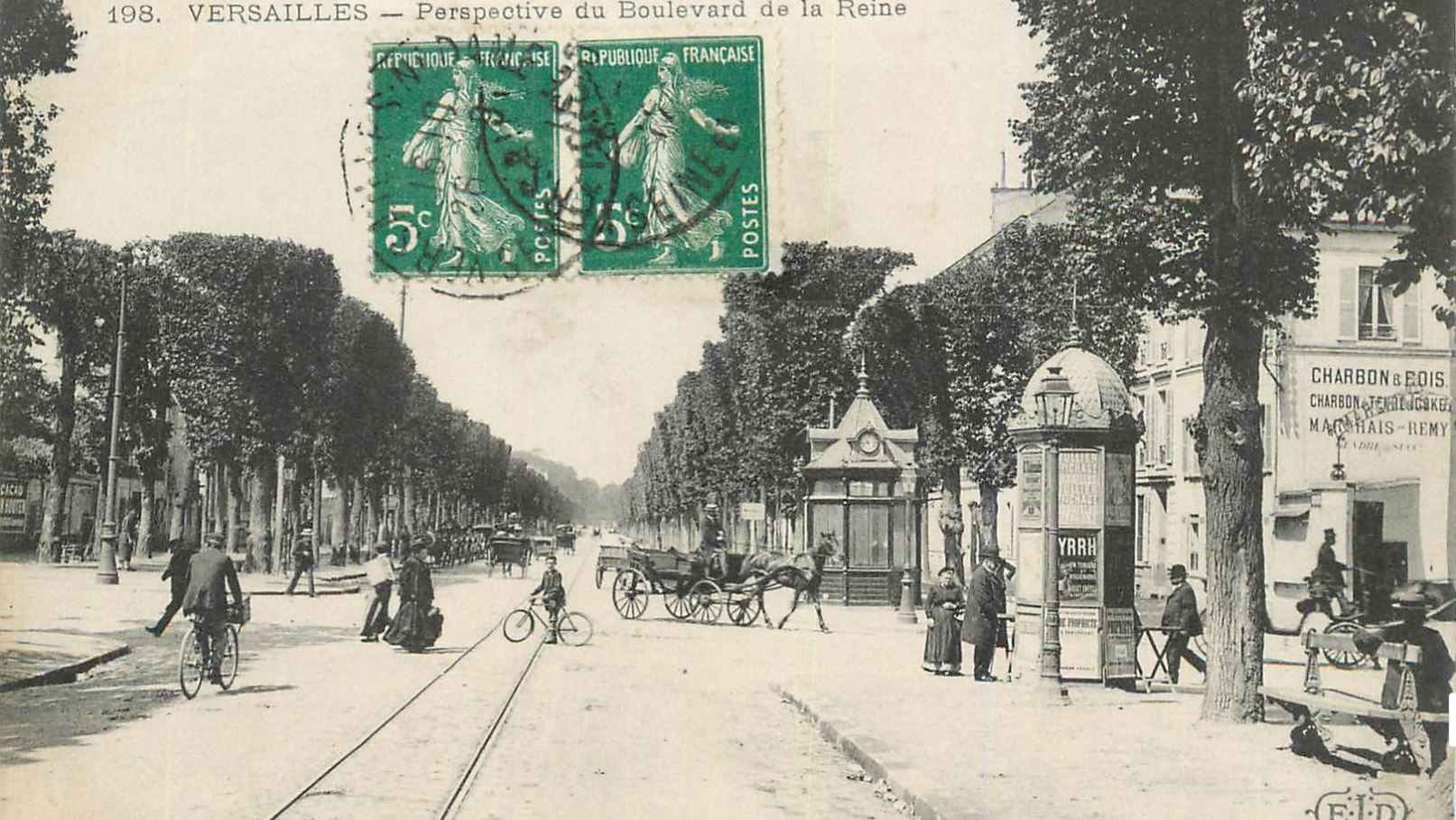
Unidentified clipped elms, Boulevard de la Reine, Versailles, early 20th century

No specimens are known to survive. The tree was once a popular choice for street planting in Belgium and France, notably at Ypres, where Henry collected a specimen for Kew Gardens in 1912, and at Versailles (town, not palace), where it was supplied by Moser's nursery and planted in "peculiar clipped avenues". Early 20th-century photographs of the Place Barascude and Avenue Thiers, Versailles, show Wheatley-like elms, some clipped, and pruned avenues by Moser's nursery. Ulmus hollandica Dumontii was present in numbers in The Hague in the 1930s. The Hesse Nursery of Weener, Germany, marketed an Ulmus latifolia Dumont in the same decade. In 1968 F. J. Fontaine reported 'Dumont' still present as a street and avenue tree in southern Belgium and northern France, but noted that "historically it has hardly gained a foothold in our country [the Netherlands], and has for some time disappeared from the Dutch scene".

The cultivar was exported to the US. An U. campestris Dumont, "a vigorous grower" with "large leaves", appeared in the 1909 catalogue of the Bobbink and Atkins nursery, Rutherford, New Jersey.

== Synonymy ==
- Ulmus campestris var. Dumontii: Mottet in Nicholson & Mottet's Dictionnaire pratique d'horticulture et de jardinage 5: 383, 1898, and by Krüssmann in Handb, Laubgeh. 2: 537, 1962.
- Ulmus 'De Dumont': Plant Buyer's Guide, ed. 6. 286, 1958.
