= Balloo, Netherlands =

Balloo
- Village
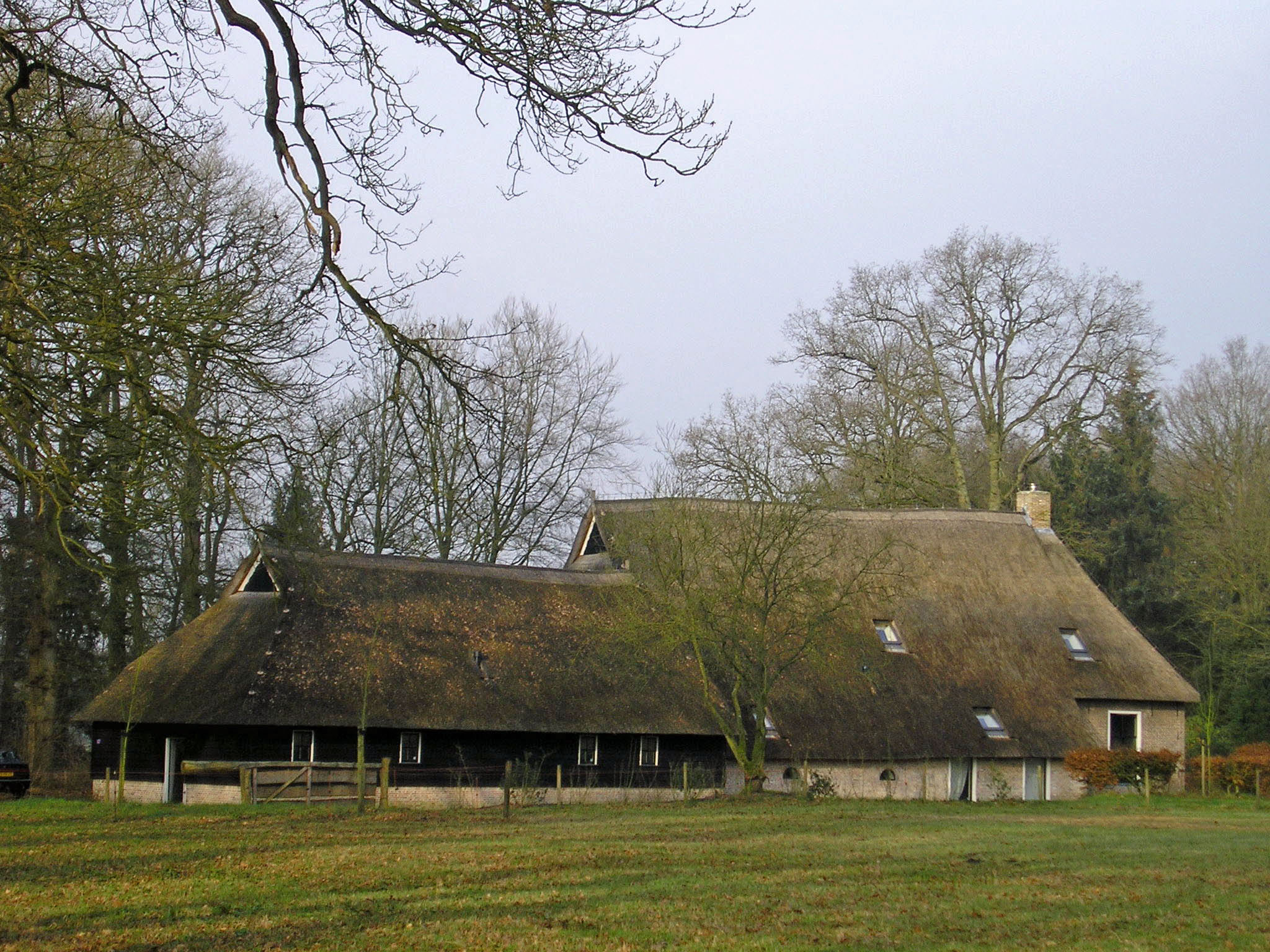
- Farm in Balloo

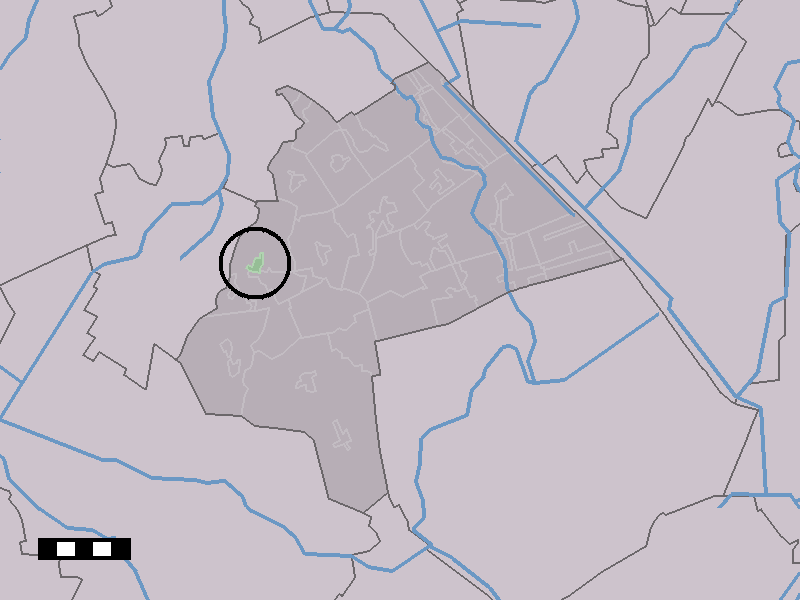
- Balloo in the municipality of Aa en Hunze.

- Location in the Netherlands Balloo (Netherlands)
- Coordinates: 52°59′44″N 6°37′54″E
- Country: Netherlands
- Province: Drenthe
- Municipality: Aa en Hunze

Area
  - Total: 0.49 km^{2} (0.19 sq mi)
- Elevation: 15 m (49 ft)

Population (2021)
  - Total: 160
  - Density: 330/km^{2} (850/sq mi)
- Time zone: UTC+1 (CET)
  - Summer (DST): UTC+2 (CEST)
- Postal code: 9458
- Dialing code: 0592

Balloo is a small village in the northeast Netherlands. It is located in the municipality of Aa en Hunze, Drenthe, about 5 km east of Assen.

The village has a population of around 150.

== Transportation ==
The nearest railway station is Assen railway station. The nearest bus service is provided along Rolde's Asserstraat, to the south of Balloo. Buses that can be boarded here are:

- Bus 21 – Assen to Emmen
- Bus 24 – Assen to Stadskanaal and Winschoten

== Dolmen ==
The hunebed (dolmen) D16 is located near Balloo. It is one of the larger dolmen. It contains nine capstones and 19 side stones. In 1918, it was chaotic and most of the stones had fallen down. In 1978, the dolmen has been reconstructed. The sixth capstone contains cup-marks which have also been founded in Denmark and Schleswig-Holstein. The meaning of the cup-marks and its creation are still a mystery.

== Gallery ==
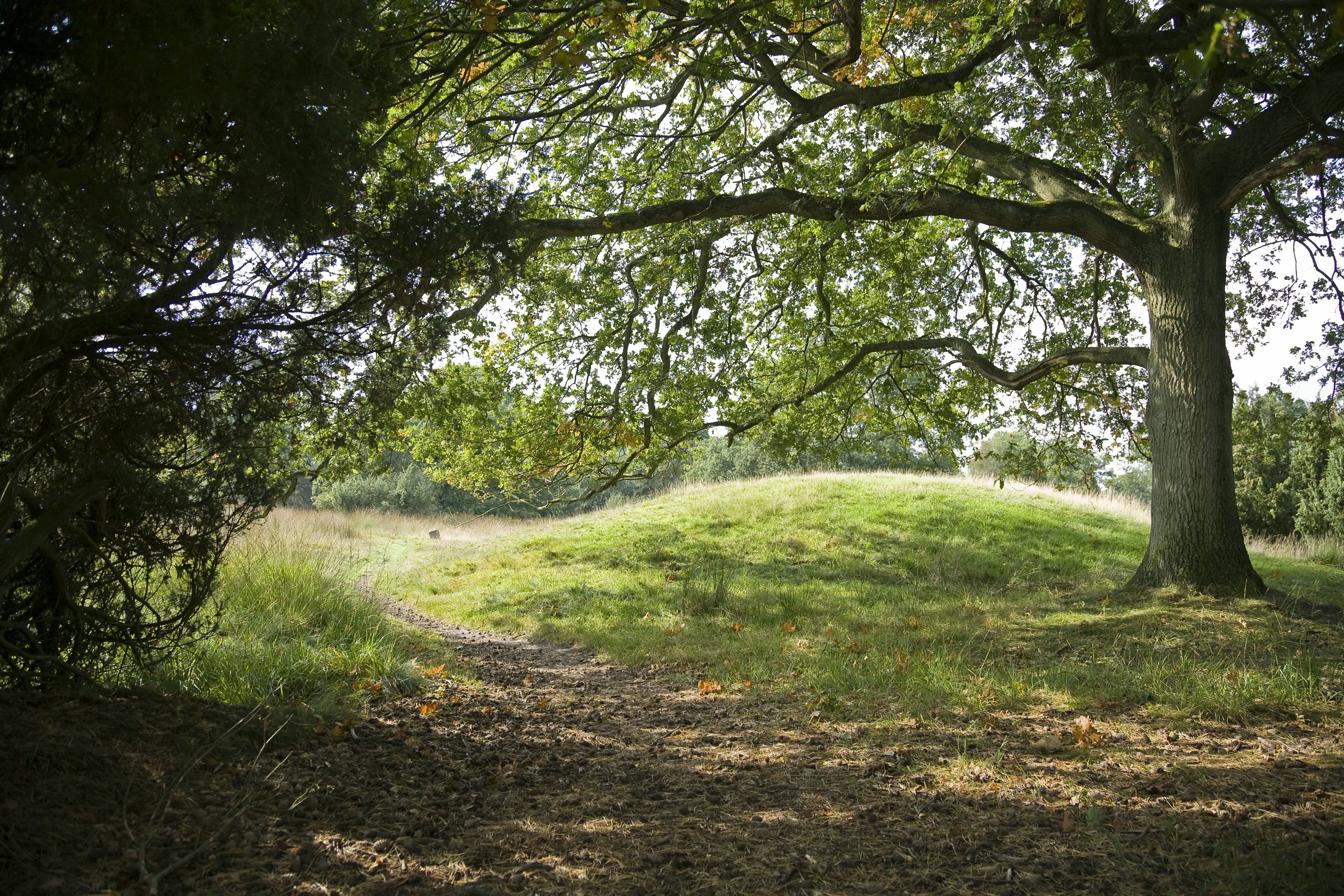
Burial mount in Balloo

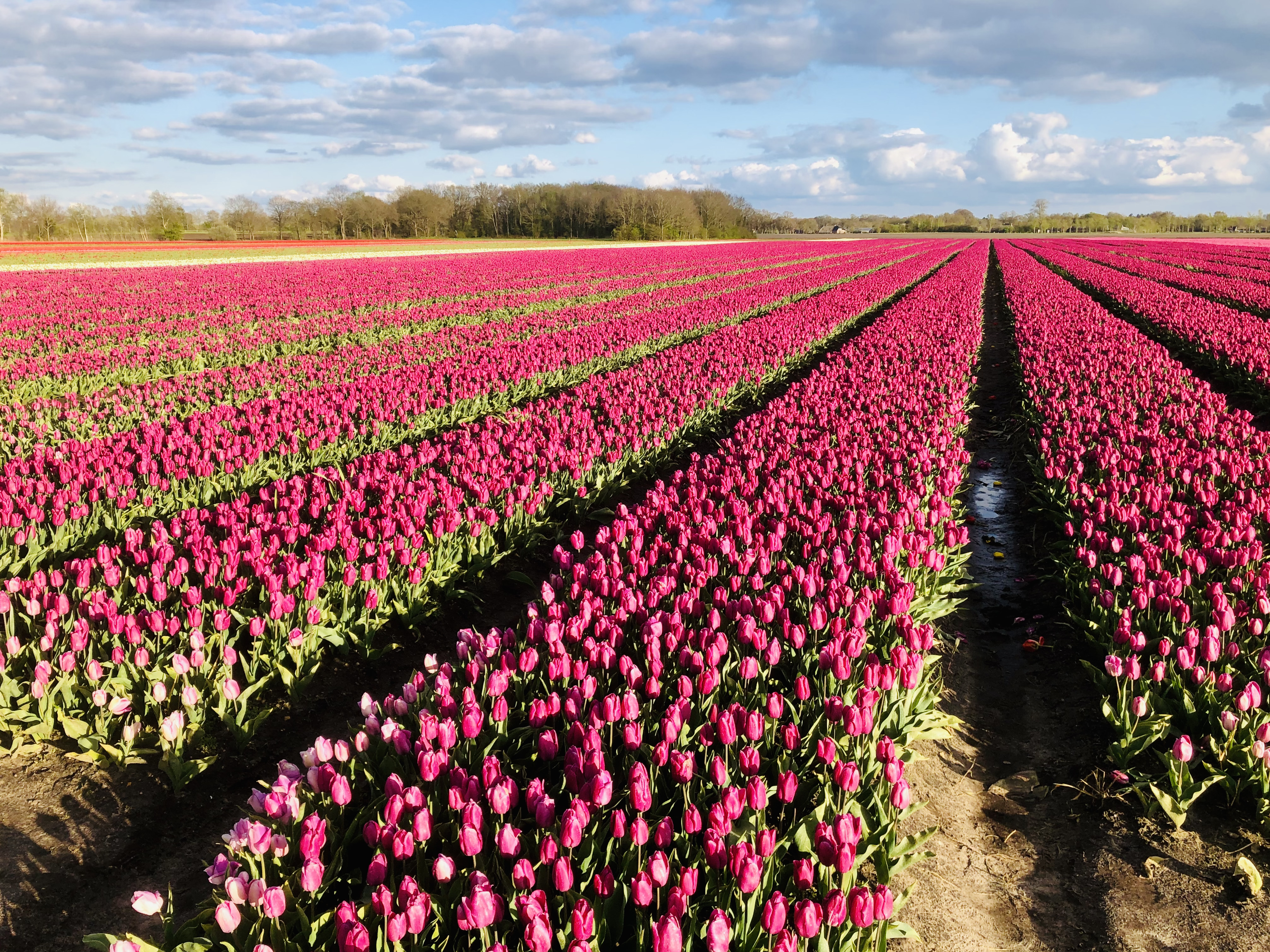
Tulip field

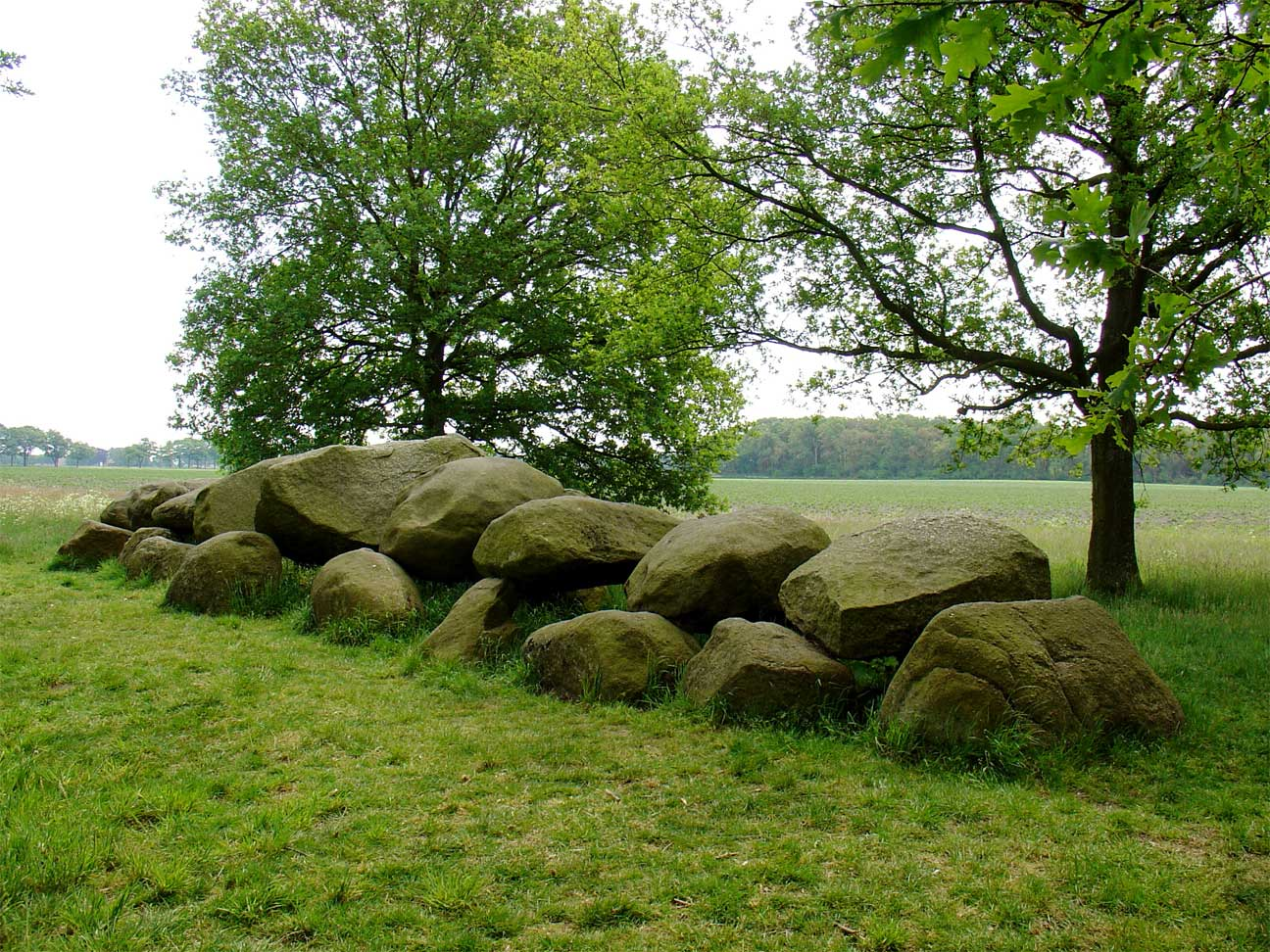
Dolmen D16
