= Ulmus 'Betulaefolia Nigrescens' =

Elm cultivar

- Genus: Ulmus
- Cultivar: 'Betulaefolia Nigrescens'
- Origin: Belgium

The elm cultivar Ulmus 'Betulaefolia Nigrescens', the Black Birch-leaved Elm, reportedly a seedling of a purplish-leaved elm, was first described by Pynaert in 1879 as U. campestris betulaefolia nigrescens. An U. campestris betulaefolia nigrescens Hort. was distributed by the Späth nursery, Berlin, in the 1890s and early 1900s.

Green considered the 1930s' cultivar U. nigricans (U. 'Nigricans') a synonym of 'Betulaefolia Nigrescens'.

The cultivar is not to be confused with Pynaert's U. campestris latifolia nigricans, described in the same 1879 publication (Green's U. 'Latifolia Nigricans').

== Description ==
The tree was said to have dark, birch-shaped leaves. Späth's cultivar was described as having "brownish leaves". No herbarium leaf-specimens of this cultivar are known.

== Pests and diseases ==
Not known.

== Cultivation ==
No specimens are known to survive. One tree was planted in 1897 as U. campestris betulaefolia nigrescens, the 'Black Birch-leaved Elm', at the Dominion Arboretum, Ottawa, Canada. Three specimens supplied by Späth to the RBGE in 1902 as U. campestris betulaefolia nigrescens may survive in Edinburgh, as it was the practice of the Garden to distribute trees about the city (viz. the Wentworth Elm); the current list of Living Accessions held in the Garden per se does not list the plant. A specimen of U. 'Betulaefolia Nigrescens', obtained from Späth before 1914, stood in the Ryston Hall arboretum, Norfolk, in the early 20th century. The cultivar is not known to have been introduced to Australasia.

== Putative specimen ==
An old, slow-growing elm on Duncan Place, Leith Links (2023), with dark browny-green leaves not dissimilar to those of some species of birch, may be one of the three Späth 'Betulaefolia Nigrescens' sent to Edinburgh in the early 20th century. It stands one tree away from the convex-leaved elm Späth sent at the same time as (erroneously) Ulmus racemosa.

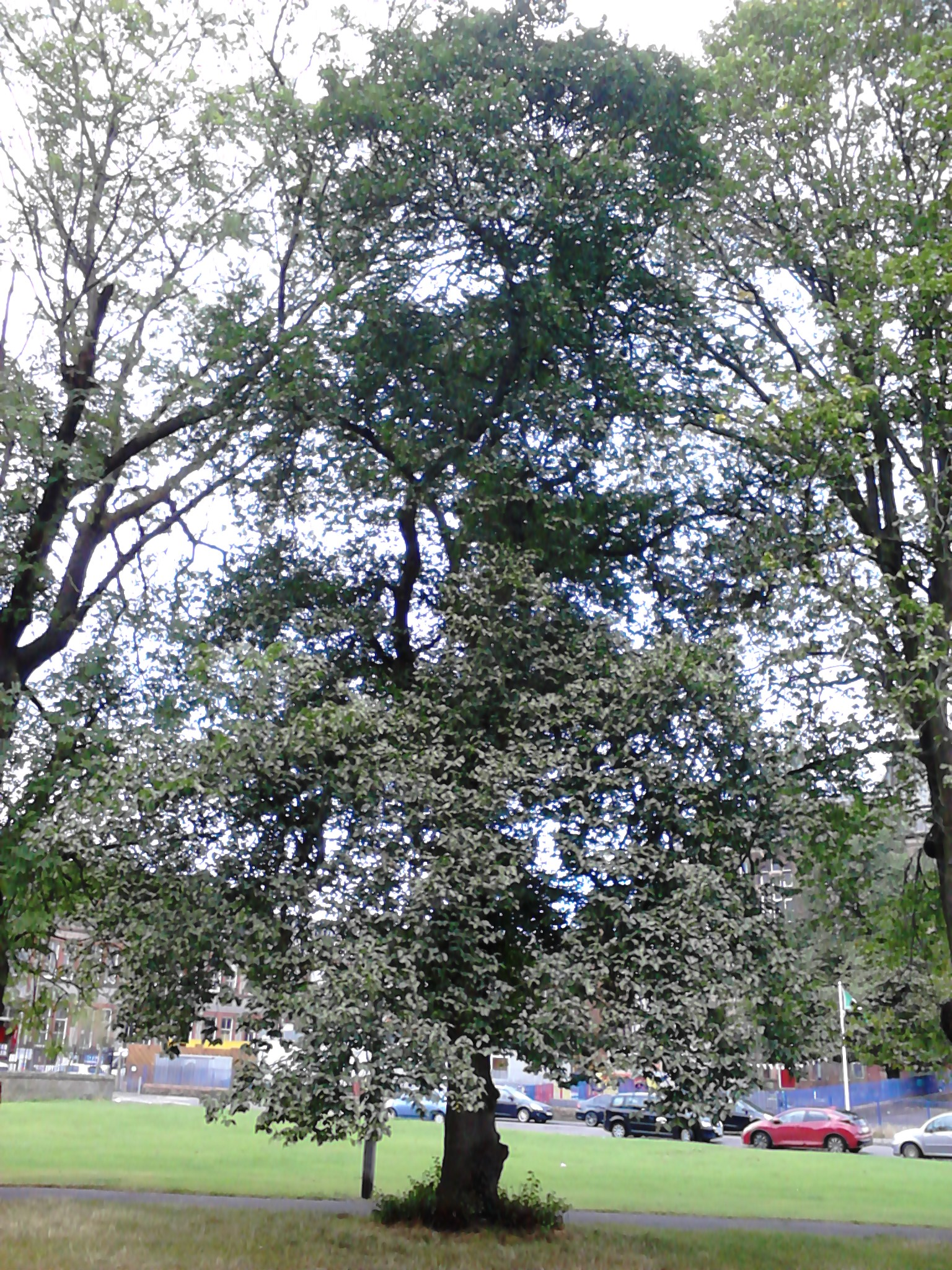
Duncan Place birch-leaved elm, summer

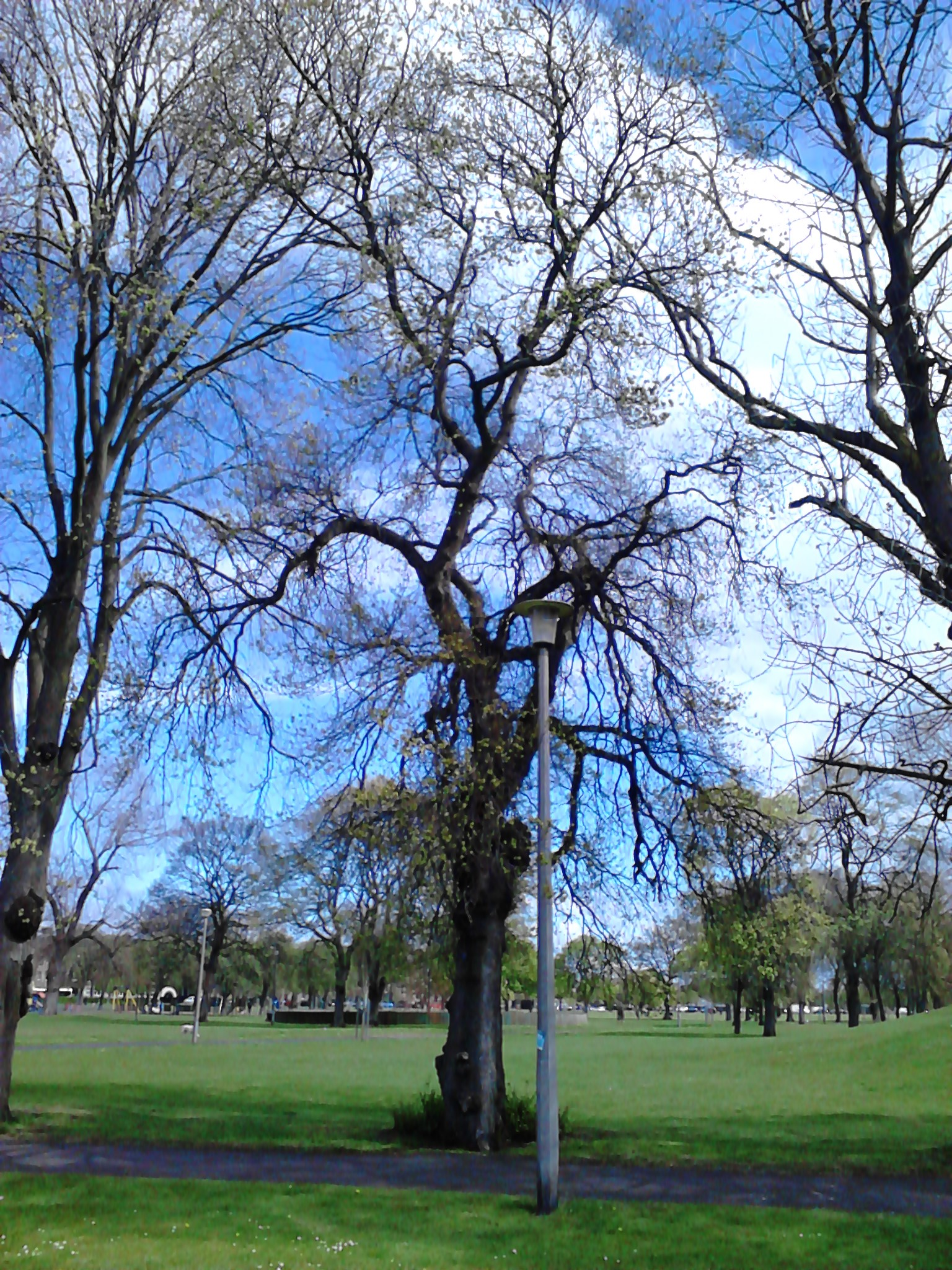
Duncan Place birch-leaved elm, spring

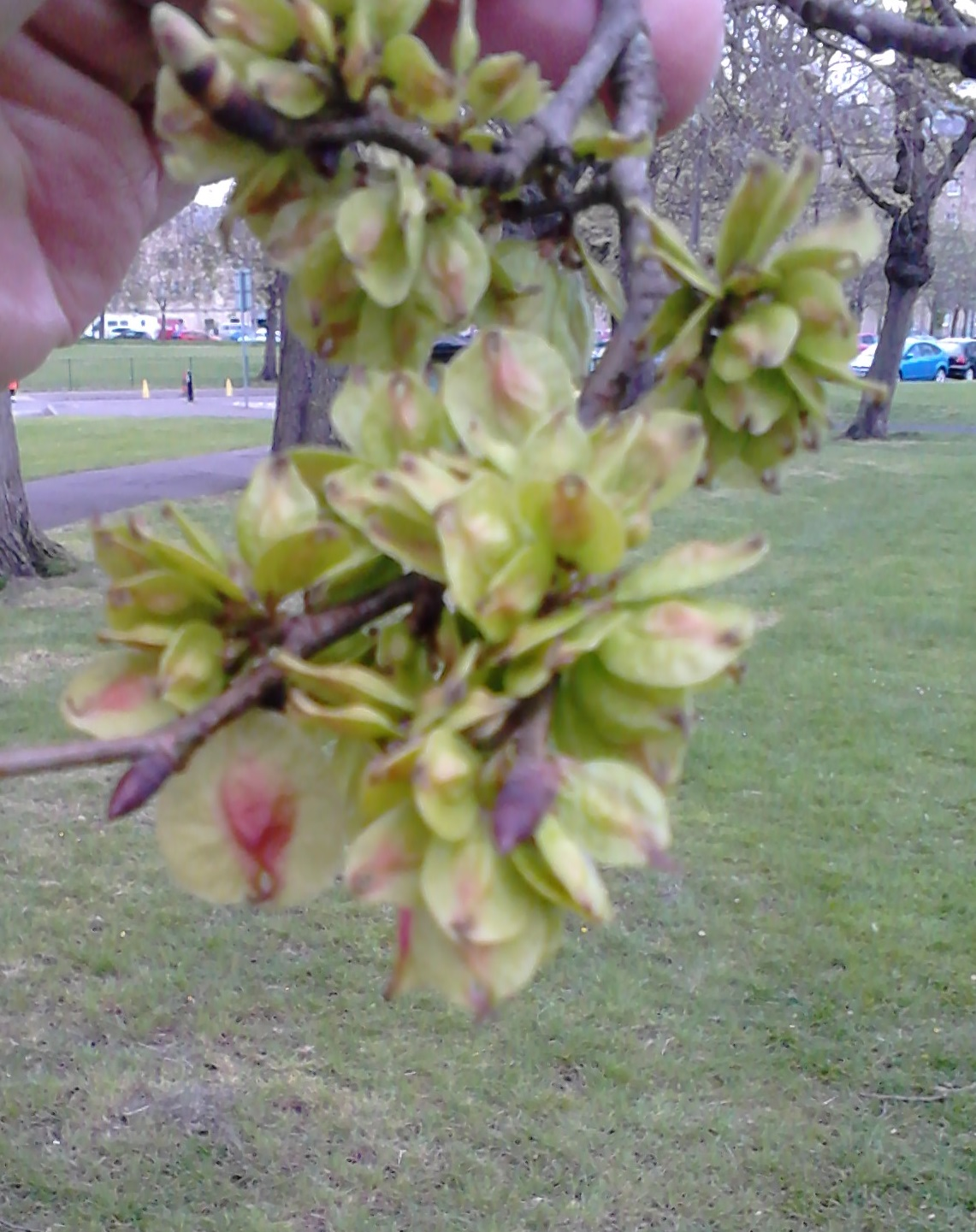
Duncan Place birch-leaved elm, fruit

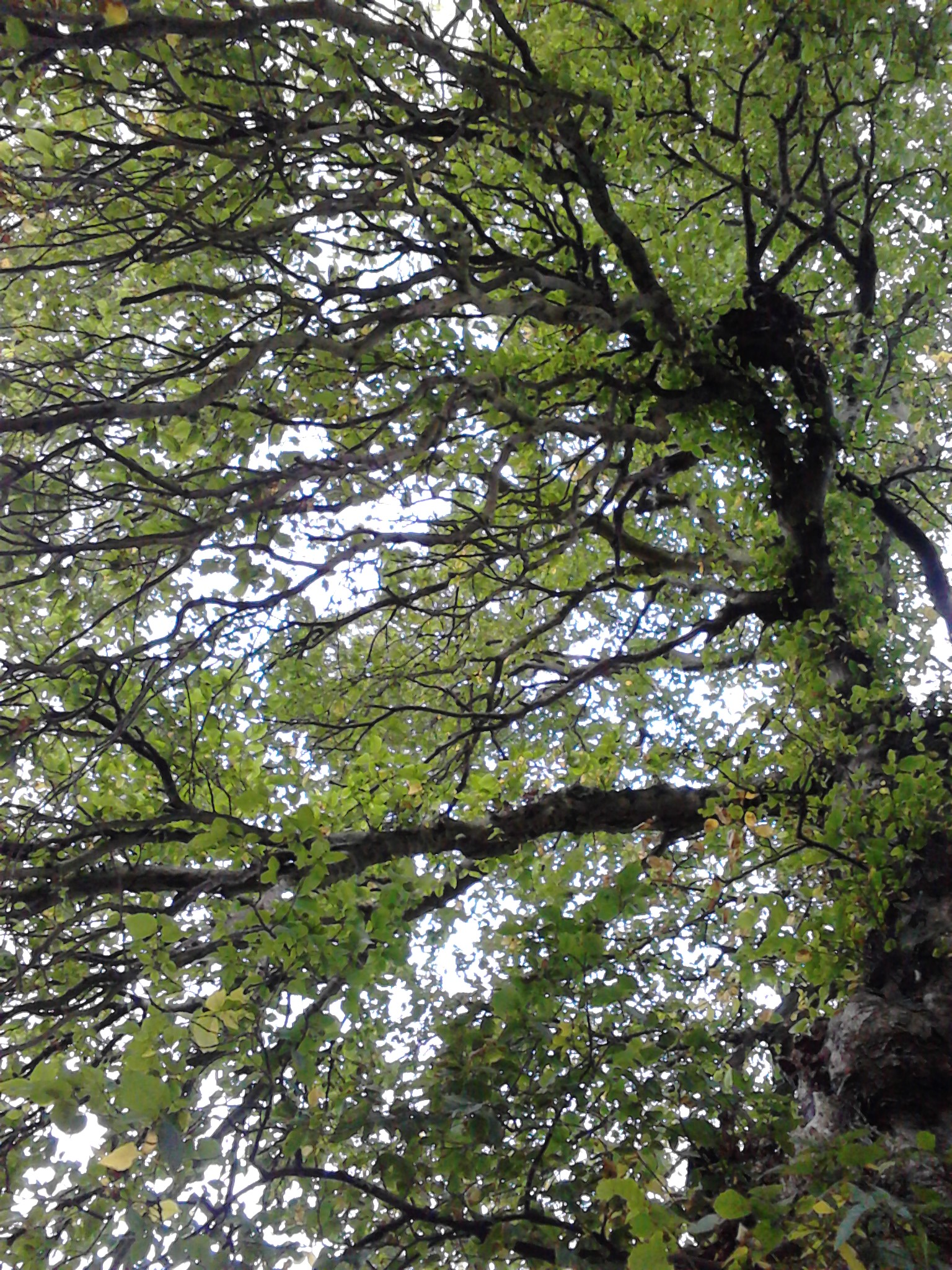
Duncan Place birch-leaved elm, branching

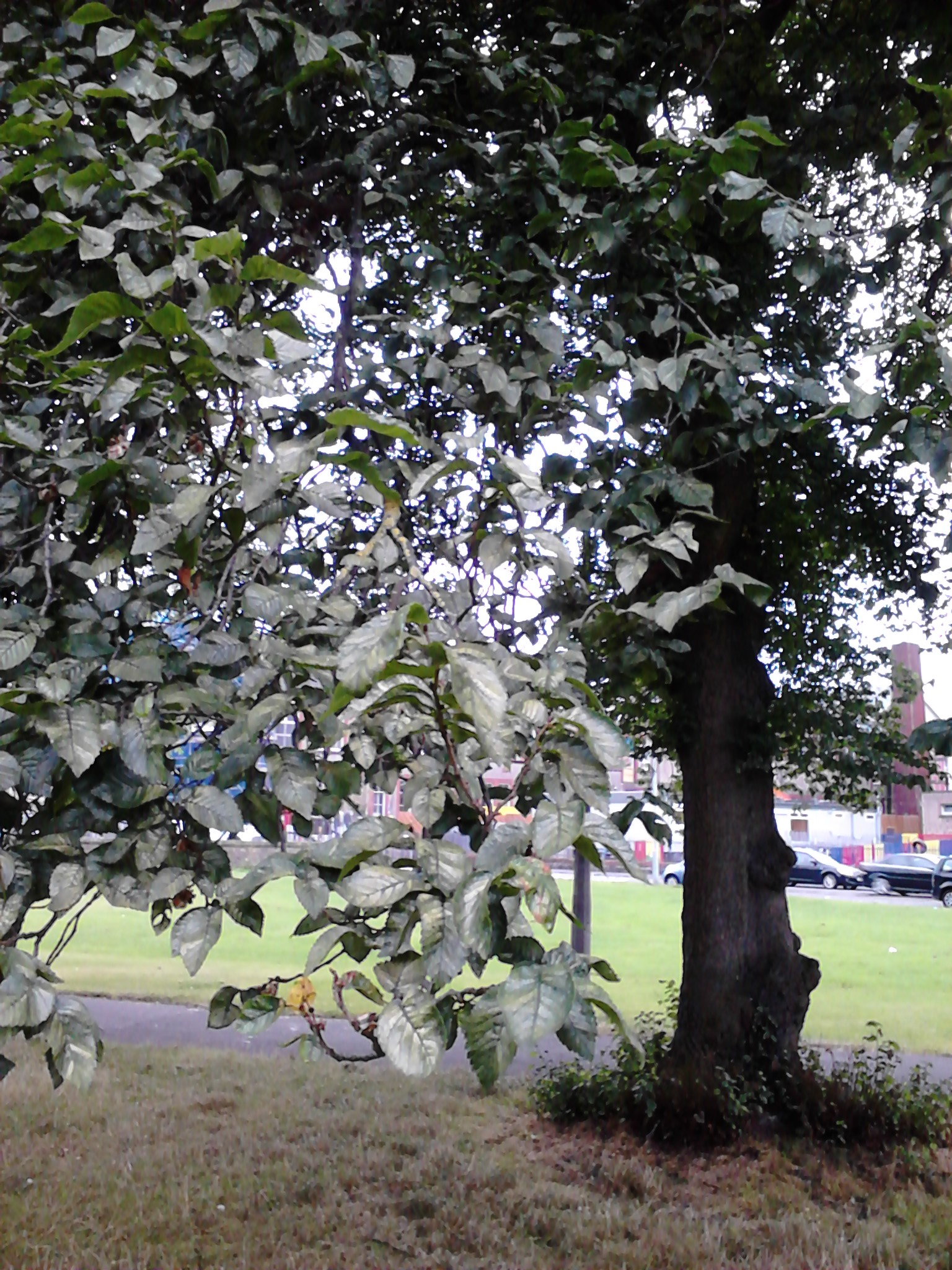
Duncan Place birch-leaved elm, foliage

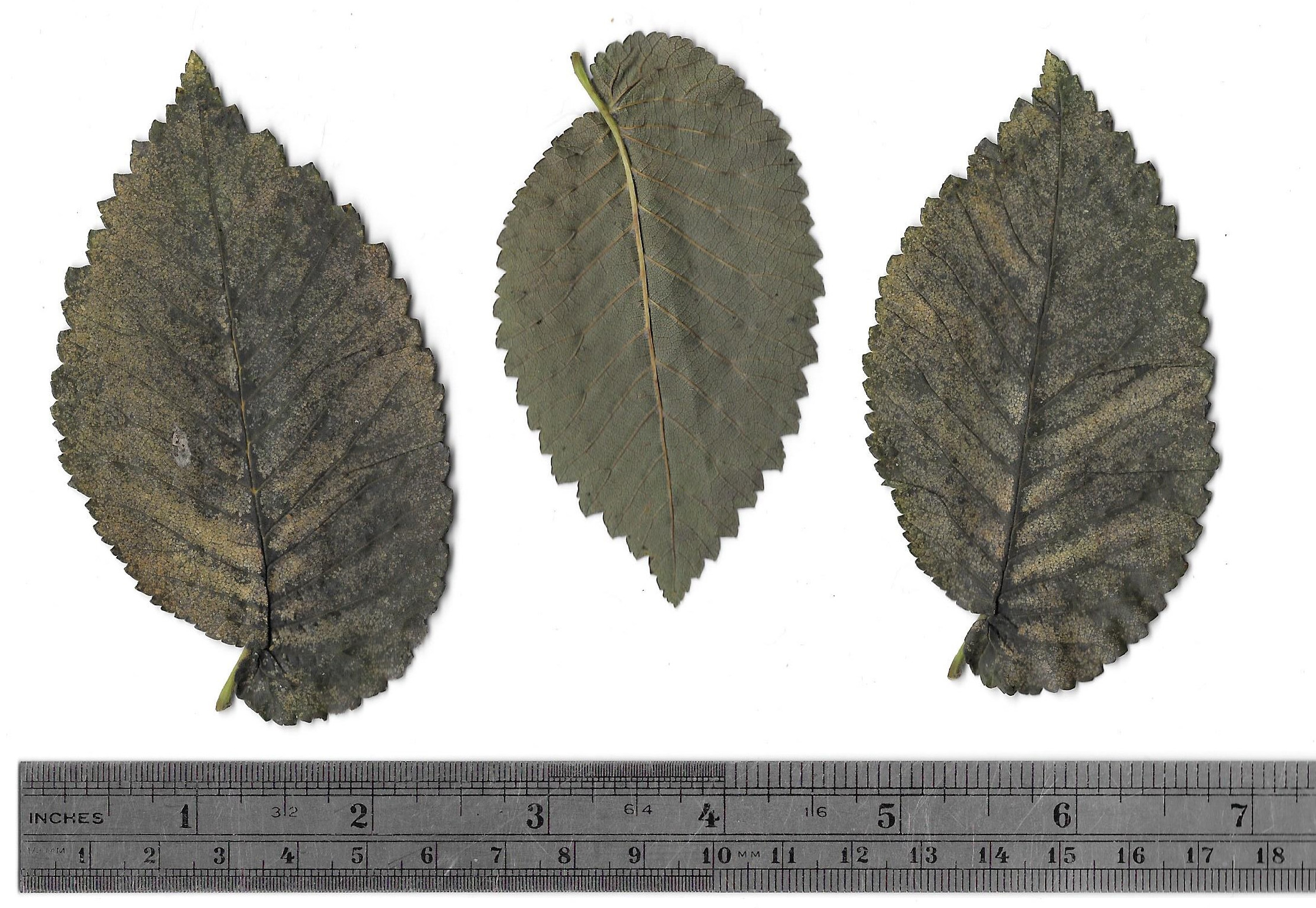
Duncan Place birch-leaved elm, dried leaves

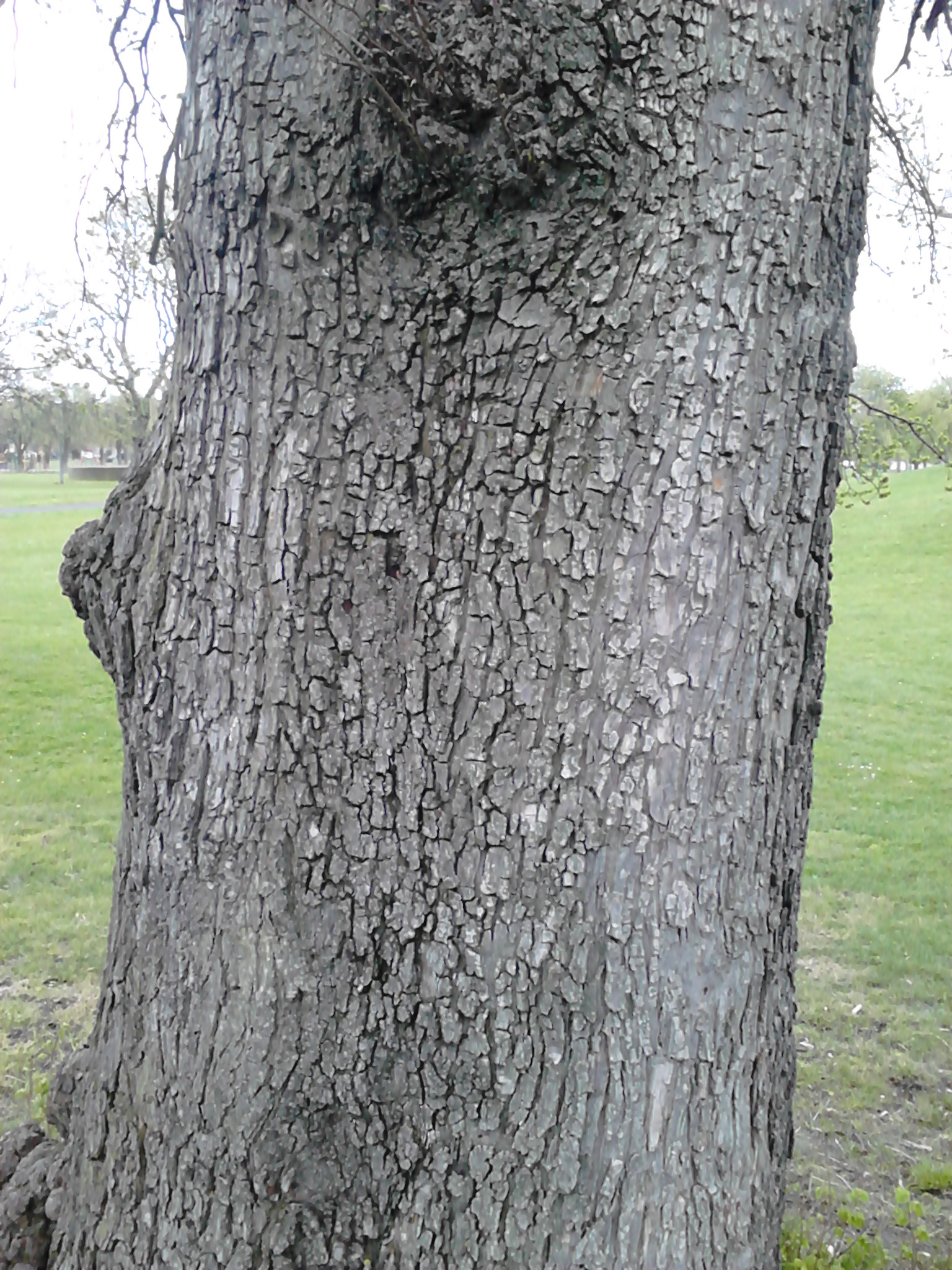
Duncan Place birch-leaved elm, bark
