= Latifolia =

Latifolia may refer to any of the following plants:

- Oxalis species:
  - Oxalis latifolia
- Ulmus minor (Smooth-leafed elm) cultivars:
  - Ulmus minor 'Latifolia'
- Ulmus glabra (Wych elm) cultivars:
  - Ulmus glabra 'Latifolia Aurea'
  - Ulmus glabra 'Latifolia Aureo-Variegata'
  - Ulmus glabra 'Latifolia Nigricans'
- Vitisvinifera (wine grape) varieties:
  - Gaglioppo
