= Ulmus glabra 'Latifolia Aurea' =

Elm cultivar

- Species: Ulmus glabra
- Cultivar: 'Latifolia Aurea'
- Origin: Europe

The Wych Elm cultivar Ulmus glabra 'Latifolia Aurea' was listed by Schelle in Beissner et al., Handbuch der Laubholz-Benennung (1903), as Ulmus glabra Miller latifolia aurea, but without description. In the Netherlands in the late 19th and early 20th centuries, however, Ulmus montana latifolia aurea was a synonym of the wych cultivar 'Lutescens', and Green reclassified Schelle's 'Latifolia aurea' as a form of U. glabra Hudson.

== Description ==
Not available, but the name suggests a broad leaf with a yellow coloration.

== Cultivation ==
No specimens labelled 'Latifolia Aurea' are known to survive, though 'Lutescens' remains in cultivation.
