= T. nigricans =

T. nigricans may refer to:

- Tragulus nigricans, the Philippine mouse-deer, Balabac mouse Deer or pilandok, a small, nocturnal ruminant species endemic to Balabac and nearby smaller islands south-west of Palawan in the Philippines
- Trichomycterus nigricans, a catfish species in the genus Trichomycterus

== See also ==
- Nigricans (disambiguation)
