= Ulmus glabra 'Luteo Variegata' =

Elm cultivar

- Species: Ulmus glabra
- Cultivar: 'Luteo Variegata'
- Origin: England

The Wych Elm cultivar Ulmus glabra 'Luteo Variegata' was first described by Richard Weston in The Universal Botanist and Nurseryman (1770) as "the gold-striped broad-leaved wych elm".

See also Ulmus glabra 'Latifolia Aureo-Variegata'.

== Description ==
Weston described the tree simply as having leaves variegated with yellow.

== Cultivation ==
No specimens are known to survive. The tree is not known to be in commerce, nor to have been introduced to North America or Australasia.
