= Hermann Zabel =

German dendrologist (1832–1912)

Hermann Zabel (22 September 1832, Neu-Katzow – 26 April 1912, Gotha) was a German botanist who specialized in the field of dendrology.

From 1854 to 1860 he was employed as an assistant at the botanical garden and museum in Greifswald. From 1869 to 1895 he was director of the forestry botanical garden in Hannoversch Münden. In retirement he took up residence in the city of Gotha.

The genus Zabelia (Rehder) Makino is named in his honor, as are taxa with the specific epithets of zabeliana and zabelii.

== Published works ==
- Übersicht der Flora von Neuvorpommern und Rügen, 1859 – Survey on the flora of Neuvorpommern and Rügen
- "Catalogue of the Botanic Garden of the Forest Academy of Munden, Germany", (published in English).
- Die Gattung Symphoricarpus, 1887 – The genus Symphoricarpos.
- Die strauchigen Spiräen der deutschen Gärten, 1893 – The shrubby Spiraea of German gardens.
- Handbuch der Laubholz-Benenung, 1903 (with Ludwig Beissner, Ernst Schelle) – Handbook of deciduous tree designation.
