= Nigricans =

Nigricans, a Latin word meaning black, may refer to:

- Acanthosis nigricans, a brown to black, poorly defined, velvety hyperpigmentation of the skin
- Ulmus americana 'Nigricans', an American elm cultivar
- Ulmus glabra 'Latifolia Nigricans', a wych elm cultivar
- a cultivar of Pittosporum tenuifolium, a small evergreen tree native to New Zealand
