= Ulmus × hollandica 'Wentworthii Pendula' =

Elm cultivar

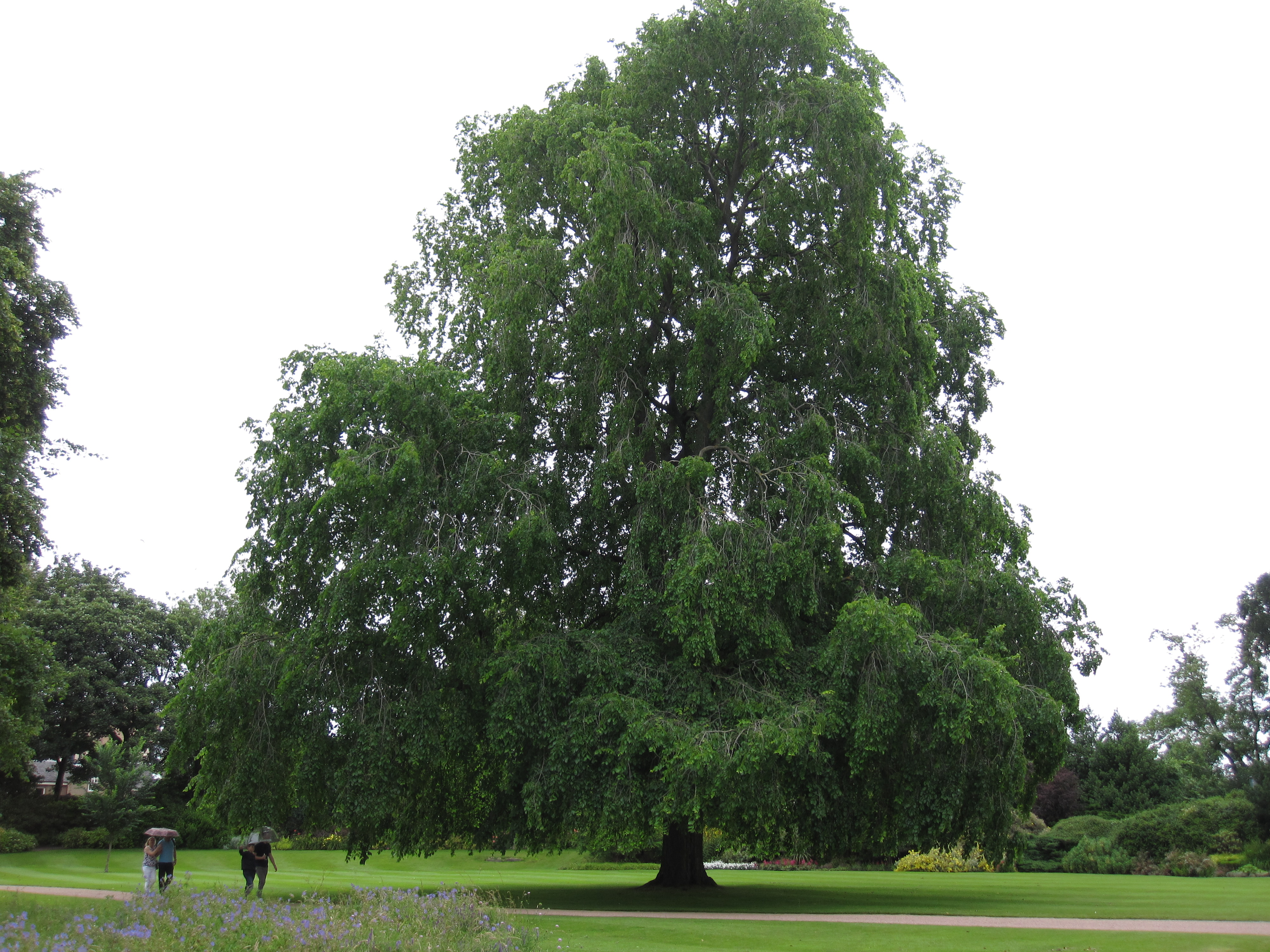
- 'Wentworth Elm', Holyrood Palace gardens
- Hybrid parentage: U. glabra × U. minor
- Cultivar: 'Wentworthii Pendula'
- Origin: Unknown

Ulmus × hollandica 'Wentworthii Pendula' (in continental Europe also spelled 'Wendworthii Pendula'), commonly known as the Wentworth Elm or Wentworth Weeping Elm, is a cultivar with a distinctive weeping habit that appears to have been introduced to cultivation towards the end of the 19th century. The tree is not mentioned in either Elwes and Henry's or Bean's classic works on British trees. The earliest known references are Dutch and German, the first by de Vos in Handboek tot de praktische kennis der voornaamste boomen (1890). At about the same time, the tree was offered for sale by the Späth nursery of Berlin as Ulmus Wentworthi pendula Hort. (see Etymology). The 'Hort.' in Späth's 1890 catalogue, without his customary label "new", confirms that the tree was by then in nurseries as a horticultural elm. (Note: John Frederick Wood, F.H.S., in The Midland Florist and Suburban Horticulturist (1851), 6:365, had described an U. Pendula Superba, 'The Superb Weeping Elm', "a really beautiful pendulous tree, with very large foliage, and weeping in the same style as the Weeping Ash". Wood's list distinguishes the tree from weeping wych; the very large leaves and Weeping Ash habit accord with those of 'Wentworthii Pendula'.) De Vos, writing in 1889, states that the Supplement to Volume 1 includes entries announced since the main volume in 1887, putting the date of introduction between 1887 and 1889.

De Vos suggested that the tree was a form of Ulmus × hollandica, a view accepted in the Ulmus names lists of Royal Botanic Gardens, Kew and Royal Botanic Garden Edinburgh. At Kew the cultivar was labelled Ulmus × hollandica 'Wentworthii'. Green claimed (1964), without citation, that Melville had identified the Kew specimen as 'Vegeta' (the lower branches of open-grown 'Vegeta' can also be pendulous), though Wentworth differs strikingly in form, leaf and bark from Huntingdon. Melville probably meant 'Vegeta' group, as he had already identified (1958) the RBGE Wentworth elm, the same clone as Kew's, as a hybrid of Ulmus × hollandica and Plot Elm. A Wageningen Arboretum herbarium leaf-specimen (1962) that appears identical to 'Wentworthii' was labelled U. × hollandica 'Pendula'.

Richens and Rackham noted that examples of pendulous Ulmus × hollandica occur in the East Anglian hybridization zone.

== Description ==
A tall, conspicuously pendulous tree, bell-shaped when young, domed when older. The outer branchlets hang in long 'curtains', showing the 'bones' above the foliage rather like Ulmus glabra 'Horizontalis', with large deeply toothed hybrid leaves, some up to 17 cm (7 in) long. The upper leaf surface is glossy and very sparsely hairy. The petiole at <5 mm is shorter than that of Huntingdon Elm. The bark of mature trees is shallowly fissured, unlike the deeply fissured, often 'latticed' bark of Huntingdon. The tightly-clustered, apetalous wind-pollinated flowers are bright red, and appear in early spring. The seed is displaced towards the apex of the samara.

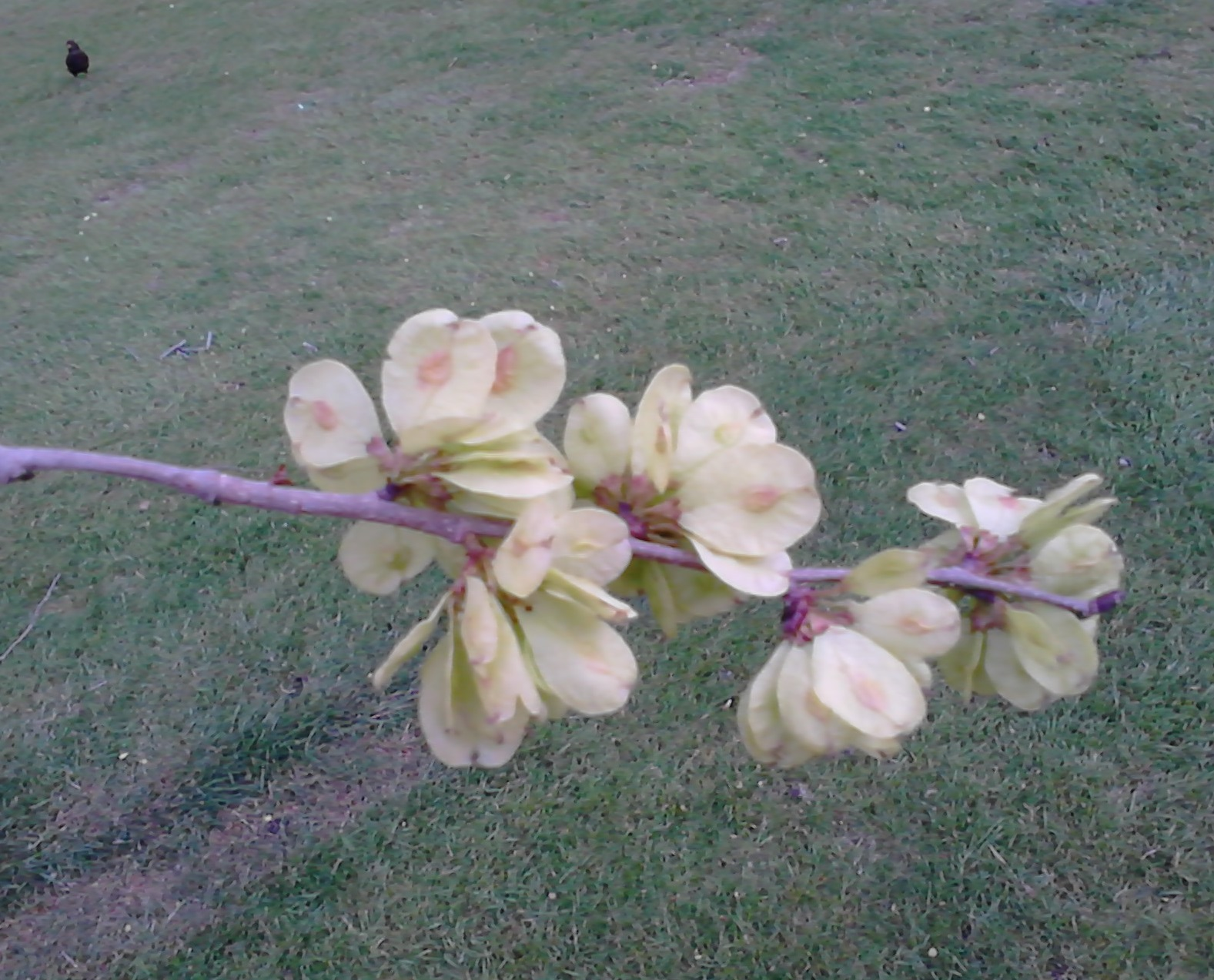
Samarae of Wentworth Weeping Elm, Holyrood Palace gardens

Leaf of 'Wentworthii Pendula', Kew Gardens

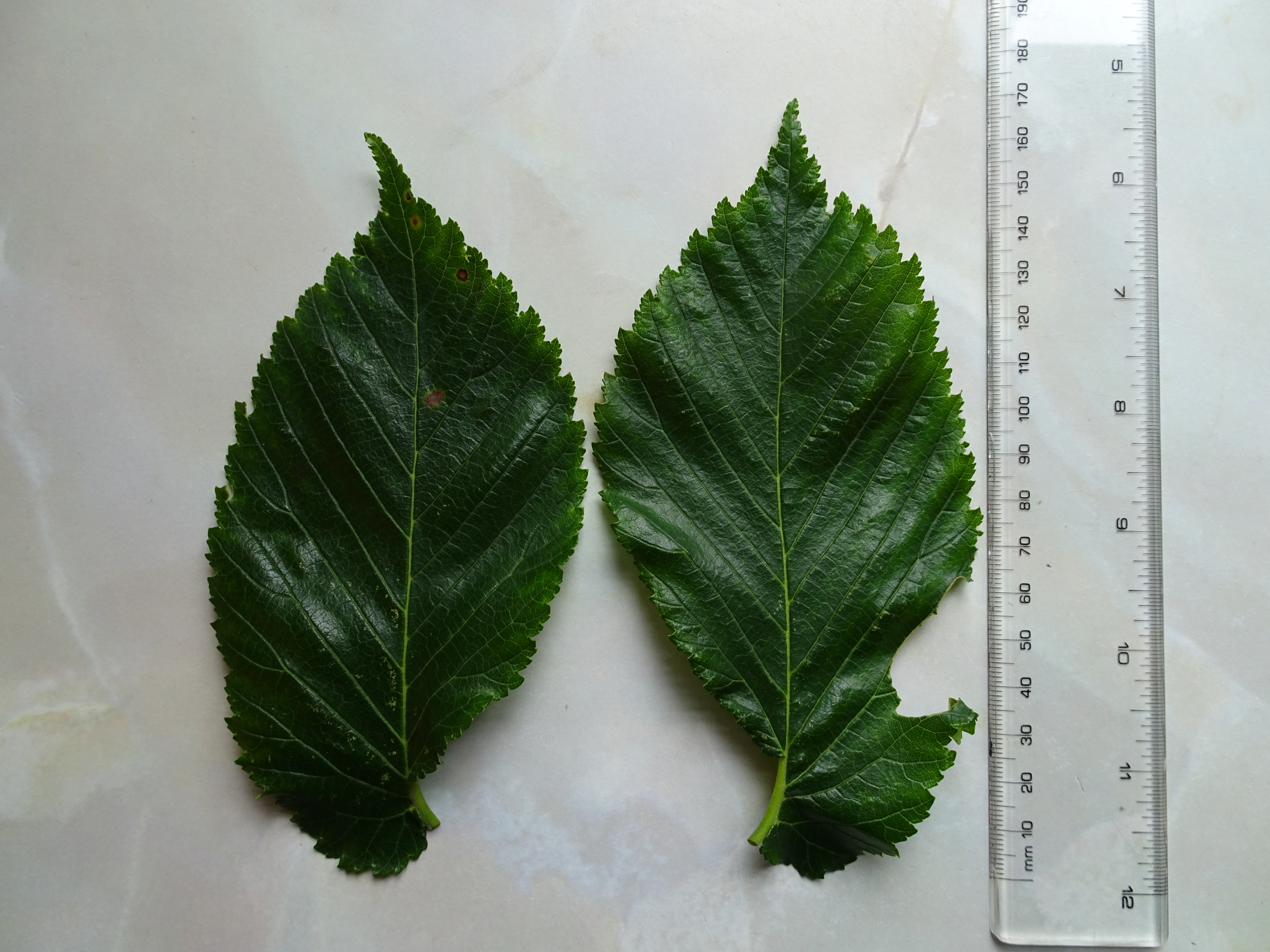
'Wentworthii Pendula' leaves with rule, Holyrood Palace gardens

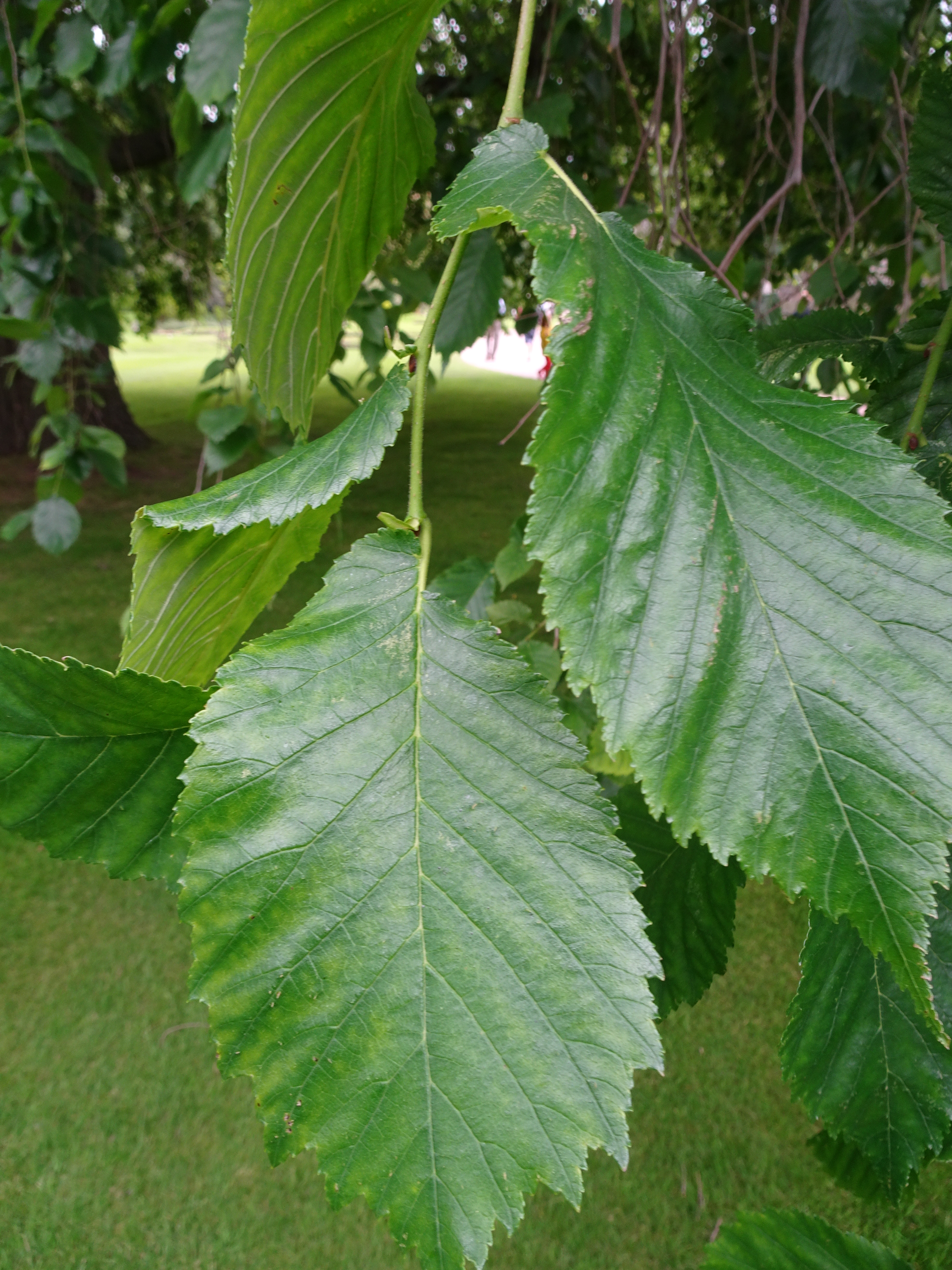
'Wentworthii Pendula' leaves, Holyrood Palace gardens

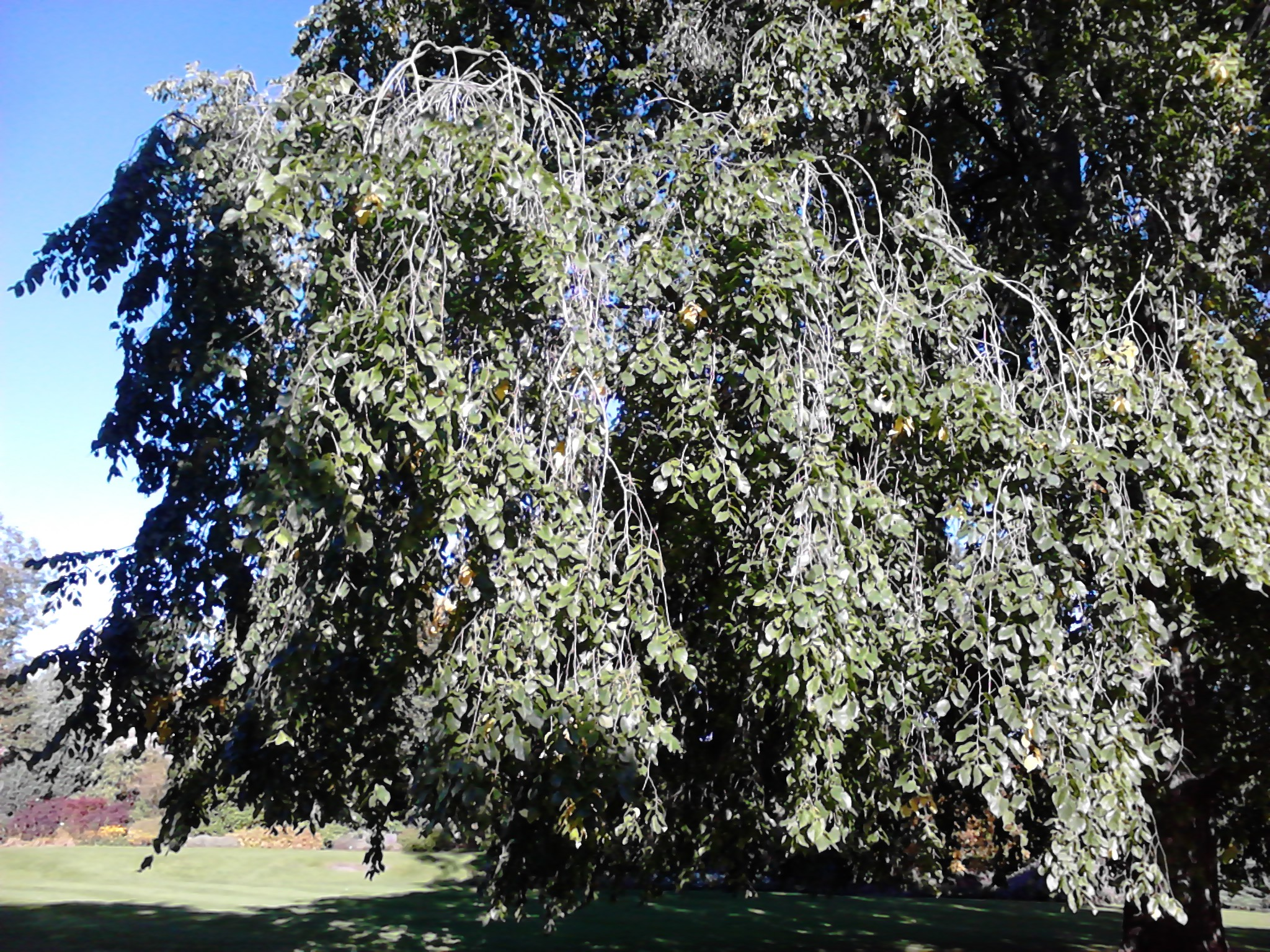
Pendulous shoots of Holyrood Palace gardens tree

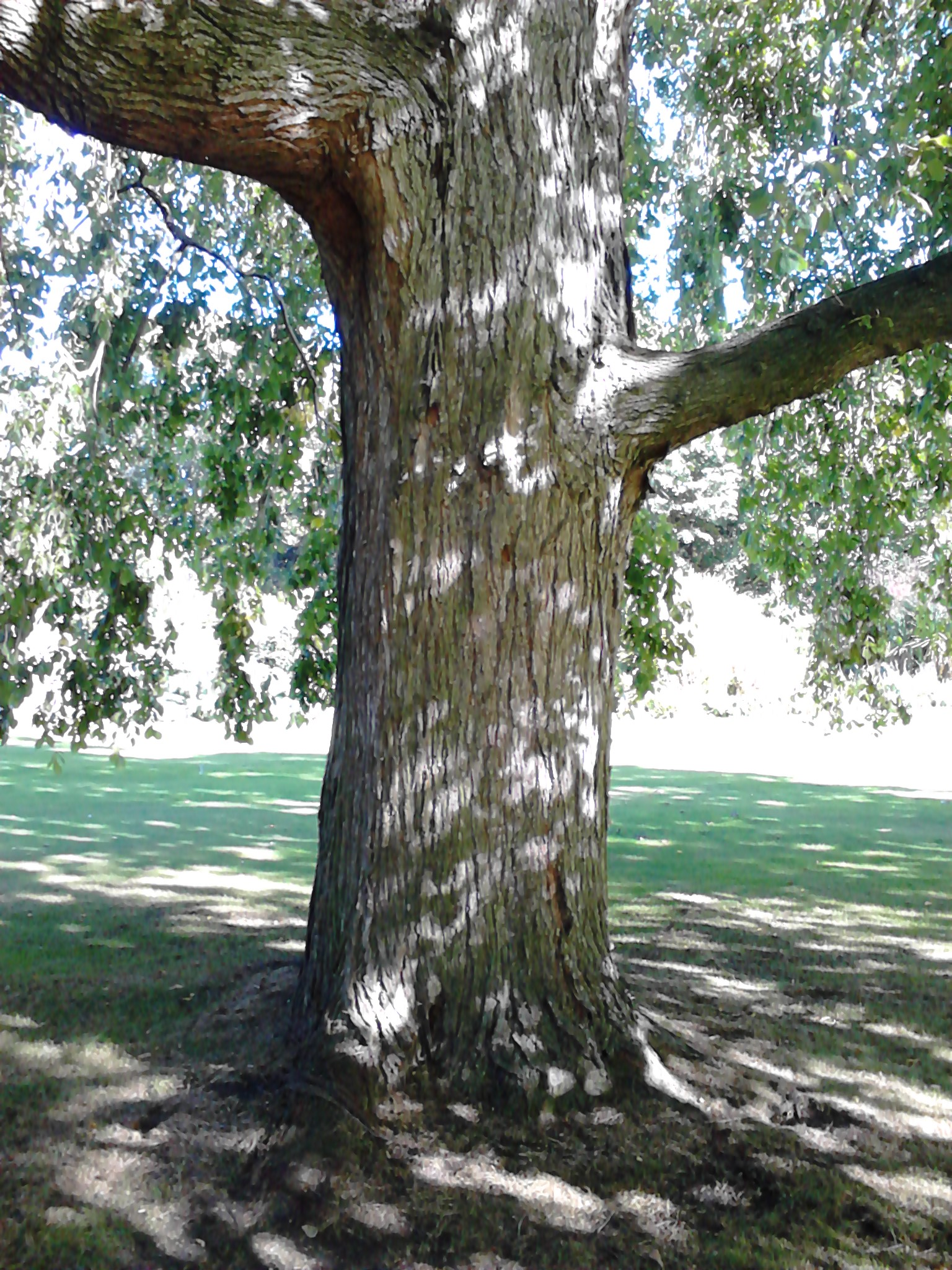
Bole of same

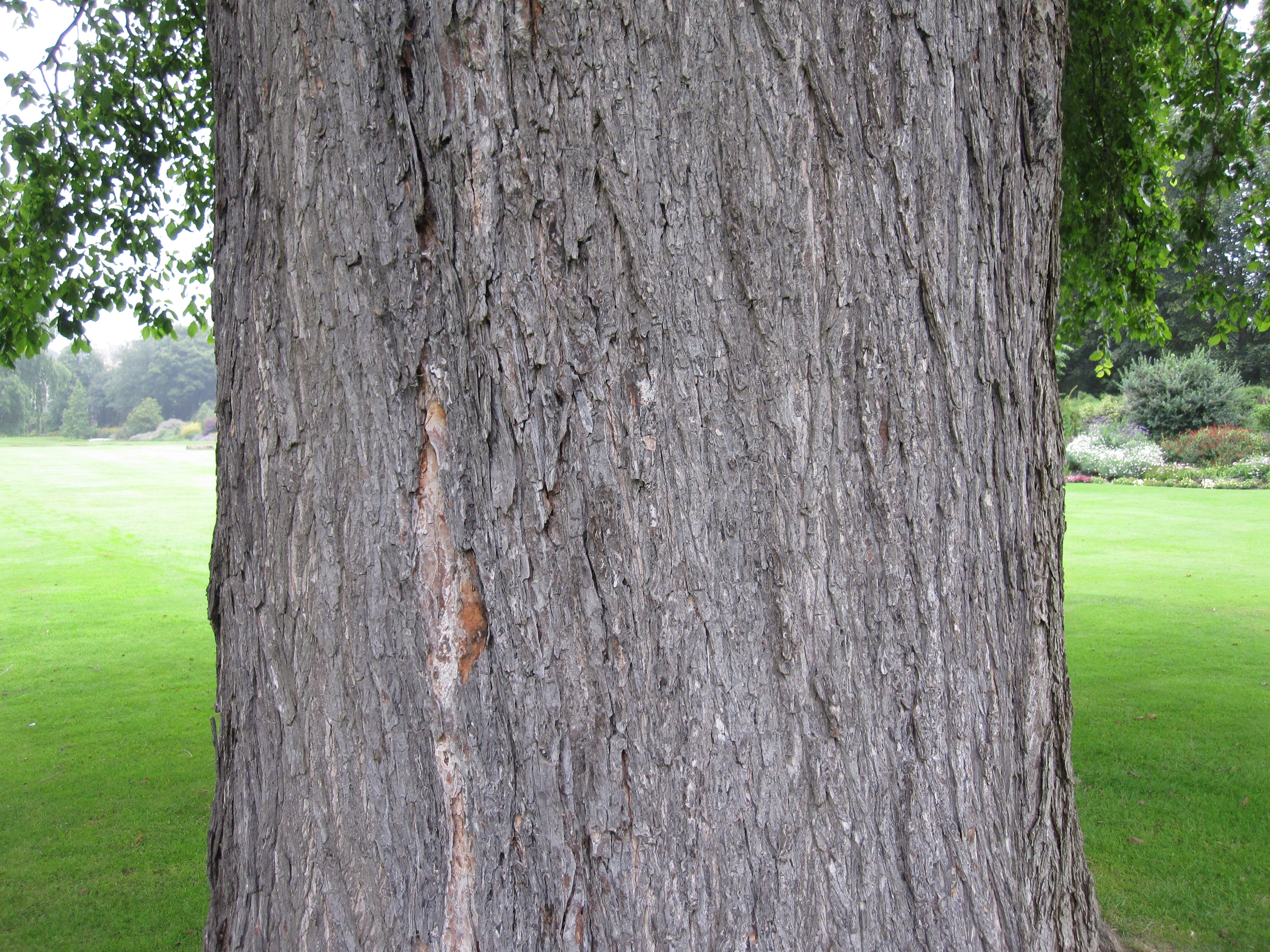
Bark of same

== Pests and diseases ==
The tree is susceptible to Dutch elm disease (DED).

== Cultivation ==
'Wentworthii Pendula' is extremely rare in cultivation. De Vos dismissed the tree as "one we can do without. As ornamentals, U. pitteurs pendula [:Zelkova × verschaffeltii ] and U. suberosa pendula [:U. 'Lombartsii' ] are far prettier, and as a (weeping) arbor U. montana pendula [:U. glabra 'Horizontalis' ] is by far the most beautiful". Späth, though he used Ulmus montana for both Wych Elm cultivars and, more rarely, for those of U. × hollandica, listed the tree from 1890 to 1902 simply as Ulmus Wentworthi pendula, then from 1903 to 1910 as a Field Elm cultivar, Ulmus campestris Wentworthi pendula or Ulmus campestris wentworthiensis, despite its hybrid leaf and samara. The tree is absent from his post-war catalogues. 'Wentworthii' was present in The Hague in the 1930s, erroneously listed as a field elm. The specimens held at Kew Gardens and the Royal Botanic Garden Edinburgh succumbed to DED towards the end of the 20th century. The latter was one of the very few RBGE elms to keep its old cultivar name in Melville's wholesale "scientific" revision of elm nomenclature and taxonomy there in 1958. In 2016 two old plantings were discovered elsewhere in Edinburgh (see Notable Trees below), and are the only survivors known worldwide. Three saplings cloned from these were planted in Edinburgh and Gloucestershire in 2024.

Exported to North America, one specimen, probably sourced from Späth, was planted at the Dominion Arboretum, Ottawa, in 1897, while the tree featured in the early 20th-century catalogues of the Bobbink and Atkins nursery, Rutherford, New Jersey. The Wentworth Elm is not known to have been introduced to Australasia.

== Notable trees ==
Two old Wentworth Elms, with girths over 3 metres (9.8 ft), believed to have been planted c.1909, stand in the gardens of Holyrood Palace, Edinburgh (2025), on the main lawn to the east of the palace. They are two of the three specimens supplied to the RBGE by Späth in 1902, the taller being about 30 metres (98 ft) in height; the shorter was lightly pruned c.2015. A third tree at Holyrood Palace was felled in 2008 following infection by Dutch Elm Disease; a ring count indicated an origin of approximately 1905. Despite the dearth of textbook descriptions, the trees were confidently identified as 'Wentworthii Pendula' in a RBGE survey (2016), because their leaves and branchlets match old photographs of the type and because no other large-leaved weeping hybrid elm appears in the cultivar lists of the time. Their lower branchlets 'routinely touch the ground' and are kept trimmed, as was the case with the 'Wentworthii Pendula' at the RBGE. The origin of this latter specimen, a much younger tree acquired in 1974 but killed by DED in 1996, is recorded only as 'Wiseman', possibly the Wiseman Nursery at Elgin, Moray.

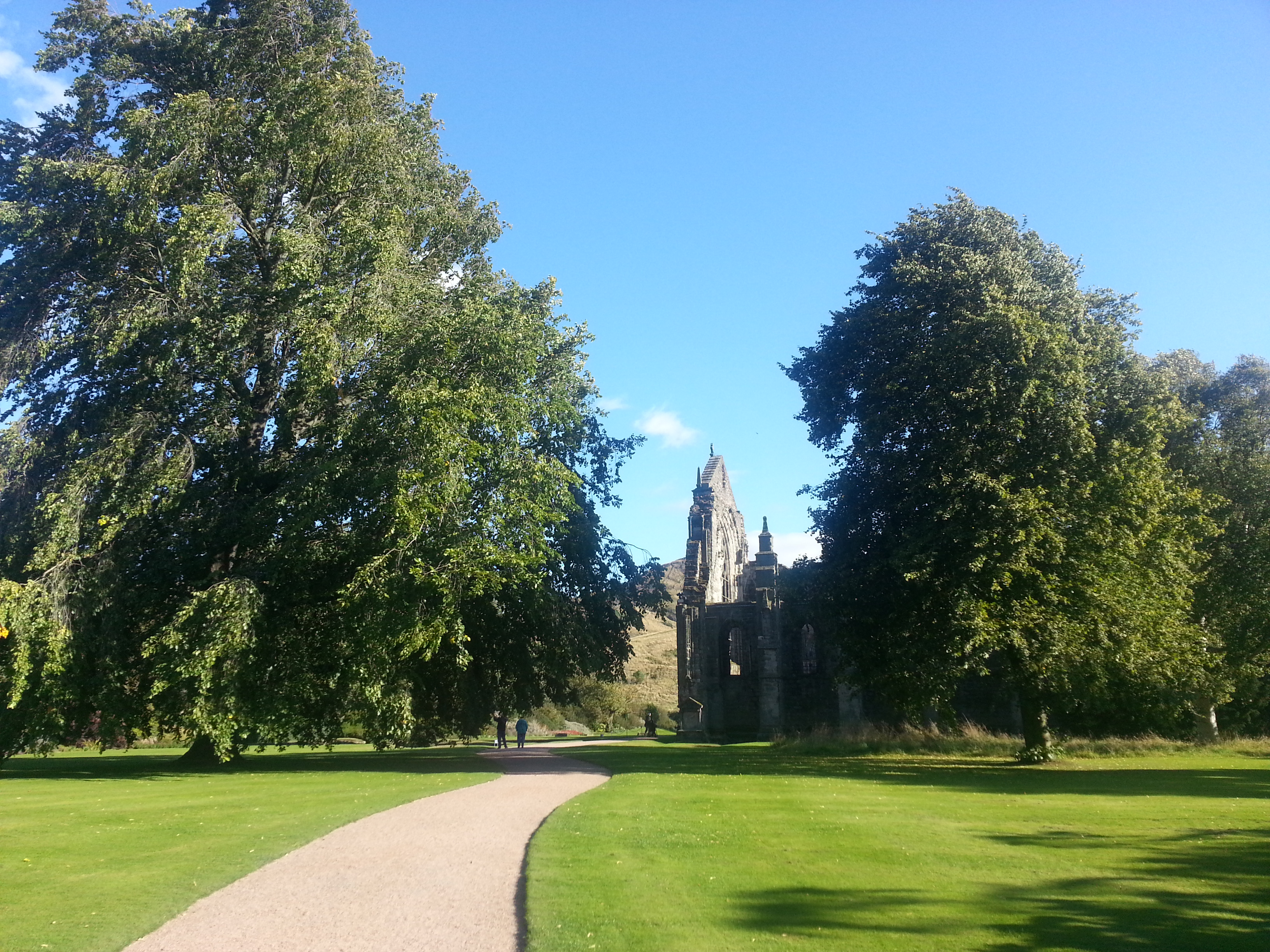
Wentworth Elm (left), Holyrood Palace gardens, Edinburgh (2014)

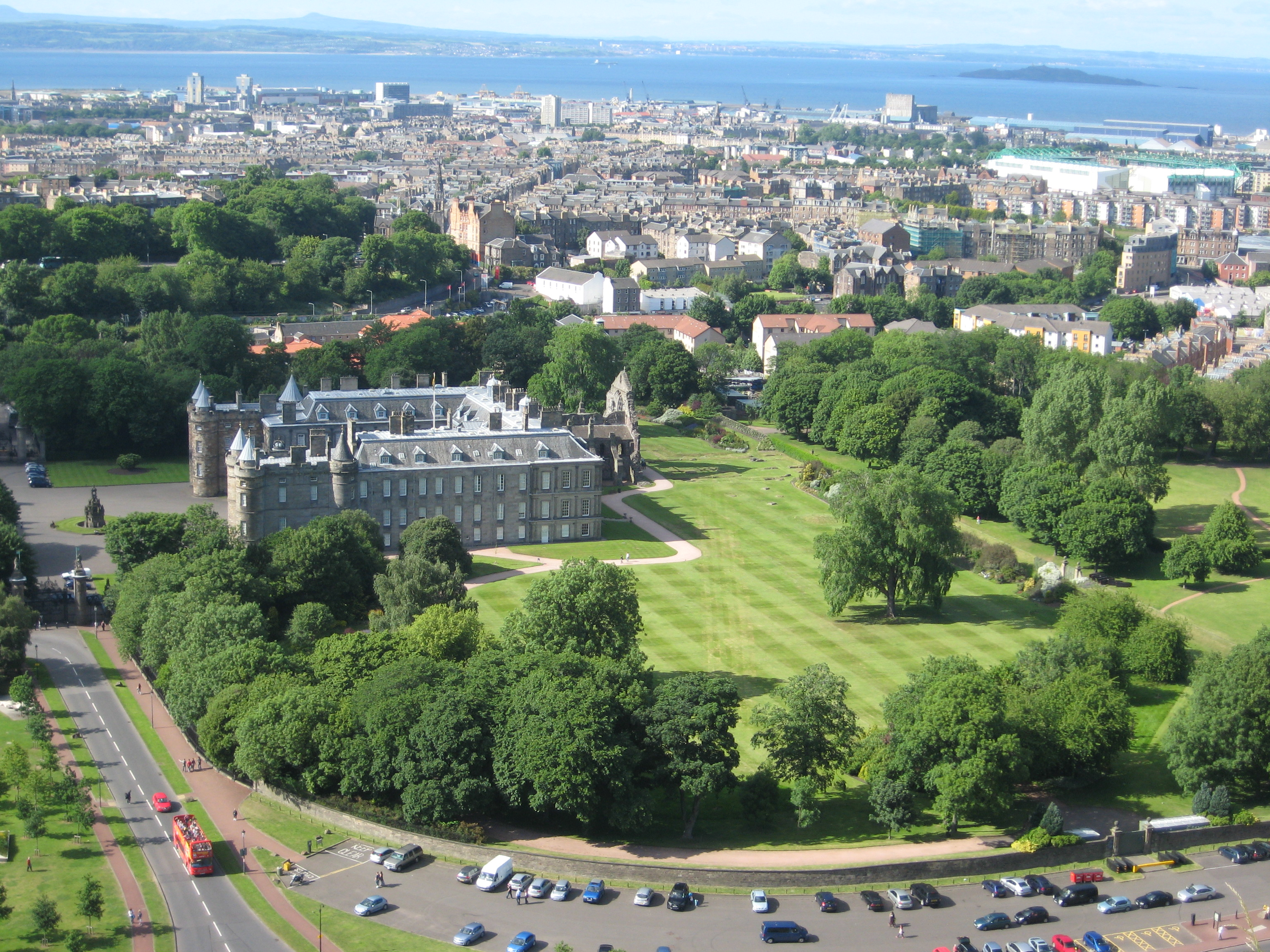
Second Wentworth Elm, Holyrood Palace, June 2010 (free-standing tree to right of palace)

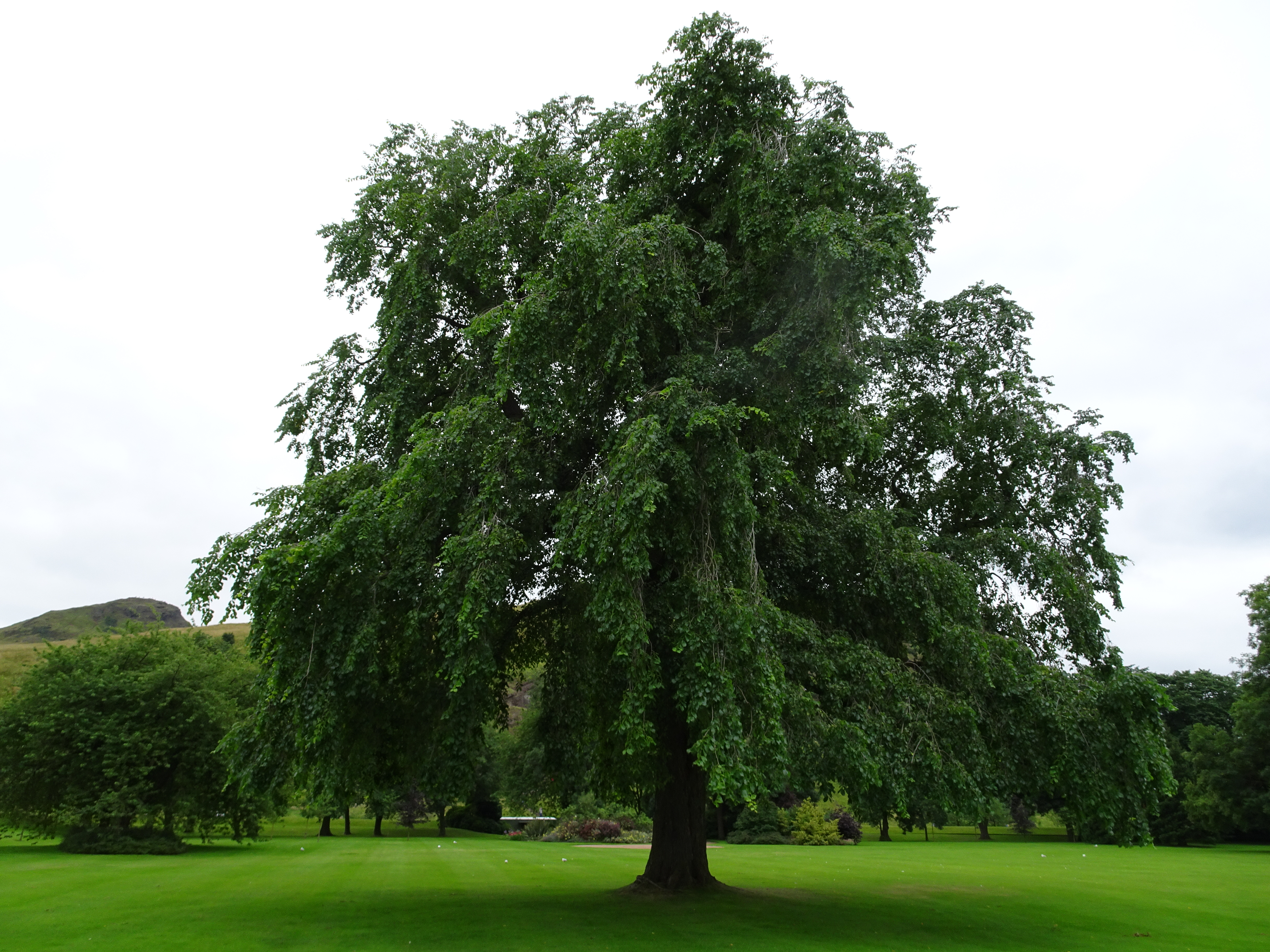
Second Wentworth Elm after pruning, Holyrood

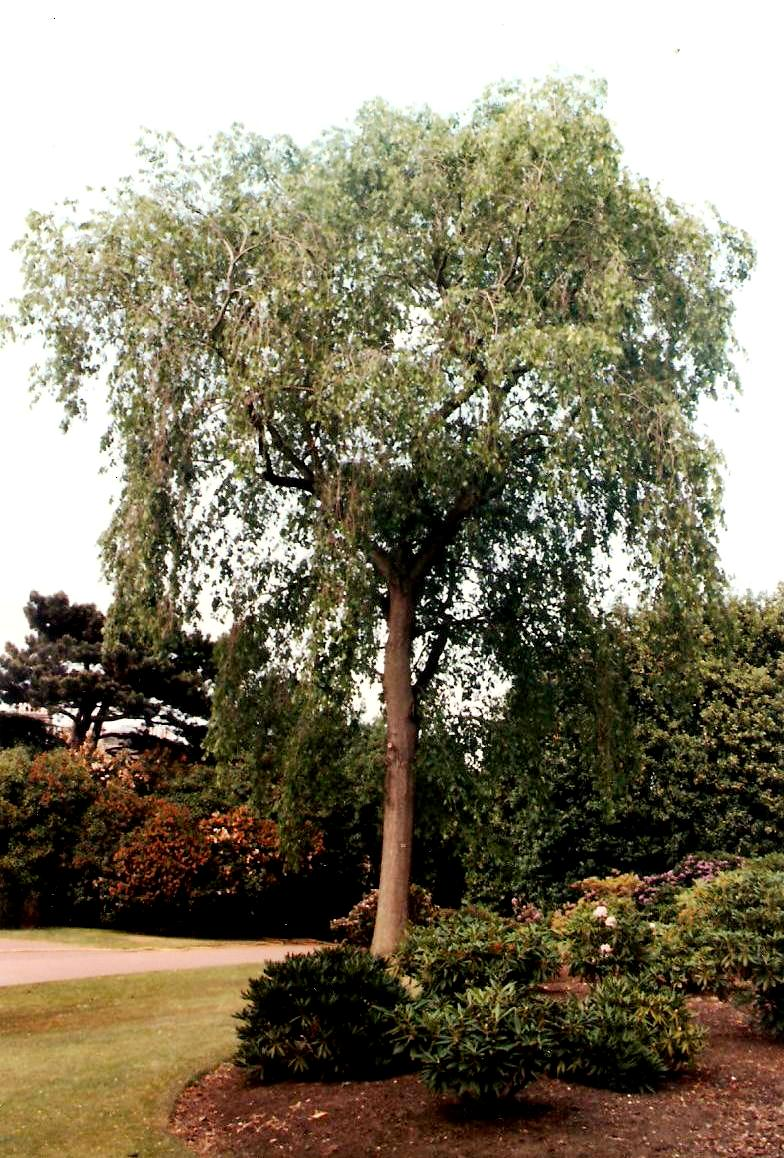
'Wentworth Elm', Royal Botanic Garden Edinburgh, planted 1974, killed by DED 1996

== Etymology ==
There is a rare weeping ash cultivar called Wentworth, Fraxinus excelsior 'Pendula Wentworthii', though it is not known whether the name is related. Regarding the ash, Koch suggested in 1872 that 'Wentworth' may have been a corruption of 'Hepworth', the name of the vicar in Gamlingay on whose land the original 'Pendula Wentworthii' ash tree grew in the middle of the eighteenth century. The fact that the Wentworth weeping ash appeared in print before the Wentworth weeping elm may suggest a marketing decision of late 19th century nurseries to apply the same name to a not dissimilar tree. John Frederick Wood, F.H.S., who may have been the first to describe this elm, likened the habit of his large-leaved weeping elm, Ulmus Pendula Superba (1851), to that of weeping ash (see Note below).

The tree is possibly named for Wentworth Woodhouse, the largest Classical house in Britain, or the architect of its grounds, Charles Watson-Wentworth, 2nd Marquess of Rockingham, or for the nearby Wentworth Castle. However, there is no recorded association of the tree with the estate and it may, in view of its predominant German association, have been named for Thomas Wentworth, 1st Earl of Strafford (1672–1739), Queen Anne's ambassador to the [Prussian court, a much esteemed figure in Berlin during the wars with Louis XIV of France.

== Synonymy ==
- Ulmus campestris wendworthiensis Hort.: Schelle in Beissner et al., Handbuch der Laubholz-Benennung 84. 1903.
- Ulmus campestris wentworthiensis: Späth nursery, (Berlin, Germany), Cat. 143, p. 135, 1910–11.
- Ulmus campestris 'Wentworthii': Dippel , Illustriertes Handbuch der Laubholzkunde, 2:24, 1892.
- Ulmus wendworthii pendula: C. de Vos , Handboek, Supplement, 16, 1890.
- Ulmus campestris 'Pendula': Krüssman, Gerd, Manual of Cultivated Broad-Leaved Trees & Shrubs (1984, vol. 3, p. 406)
