= Ulmus glabra 'Latifolia Aureo-Variegata' =

Elm cultivar

- Species: Ulmus glabra
- Cultivar: 'Latifolia Aureo-Variegata'
- Origin: Europe

The Wych elm cultivar Ulmus glabra 'Latifolia Aureo-Variegata' was first mentioned by Neubert in Deutsches Magazin für Garten- und Blumenkunde 1871 as Ulmus campestris L. latifolia aureo-variegata.

See also Ulmus glabra 'Luteo Variegata'.

== Description ==
Neubert described the tree as "a beautiful new variety with coloured ornamental leaves".

== Cultivation ==
A tree said to be yellow-variegated "mountain elm" elm, Wiąz górski [:U. glabra Huds. ] 'Aureovariegata'", with "dark green leaves interlaced with golden-yellow fragments that irregularly cover a large area of the leaf blade", is sold in a nursery in Poland, where it is described as rare.

== Synonymy ==
- Ulmus campestris latifolia foliis aureo-variegatis: Baudriller, (Angers, France), Catalogue 43, p. 116, 1880.
