= Ulmus glabra 'Latifolia Nigricans' =

Elm cultivar

- Species: Ulmus glabra
- Cultivar: 'Latifolia Nigricans'
- Origin: Europe

The putative Wych Elm cultivar Ulmus glabra 'Latifolia Nigricans' was first described, as Ulmus campestris latifolia nigricans, by Pynaert in 1879. Pynaert, however, did not specify what species he meant by U. campestris. The tree was supplied by the Späth nursery of Berlin in the late 19th century and early 20th as Ulmus montana latifolia nigricans. Späth, like many of his contemporaries, used U. montana both for Wych Elm cultivars and for those of the U. × hollandica group.

== Description ==
Pynaert described the tree as "very vigorous, the leaves being large and of a dark tint".

== Cultivation ==
No specimens are known to survive. One tree, probably supplied by the Späth nursery of Berlin, was planted as Ulmus montana latifolia nigricans in 1896 at the Dominion Arboretum, Ottawa, Canada. Three specimens supplied by Späth to the Royal Botanic Garden Edinburgh in 1902 as Ulmus montana latifolia nigricans may survive in Edinburgh as it was the practice of the Garden to distribute trees about the city (viz. the Wentworth Elm); the current list of Living Accessions held in the Garden per se does not list the plant. U. latifolia nigricans, a "dark, large-leaved elm", appeared in the 1902 catalogue of the Bobbink and Atkins nursery, Rutherford, New Jersey.

=== Putative specimens ===
Two vigorous, suckering hybrid elms (presumed U. × hollandica), in the SW corner of Inverleith Park, Edinburgh, near the Royal Botanic Garden, with broad leaves held dark-green till early December, match descriptions of Späth's U. montana latifolia nigricans and may be regrowth from one of the early 20th-century specimens from Berlin.

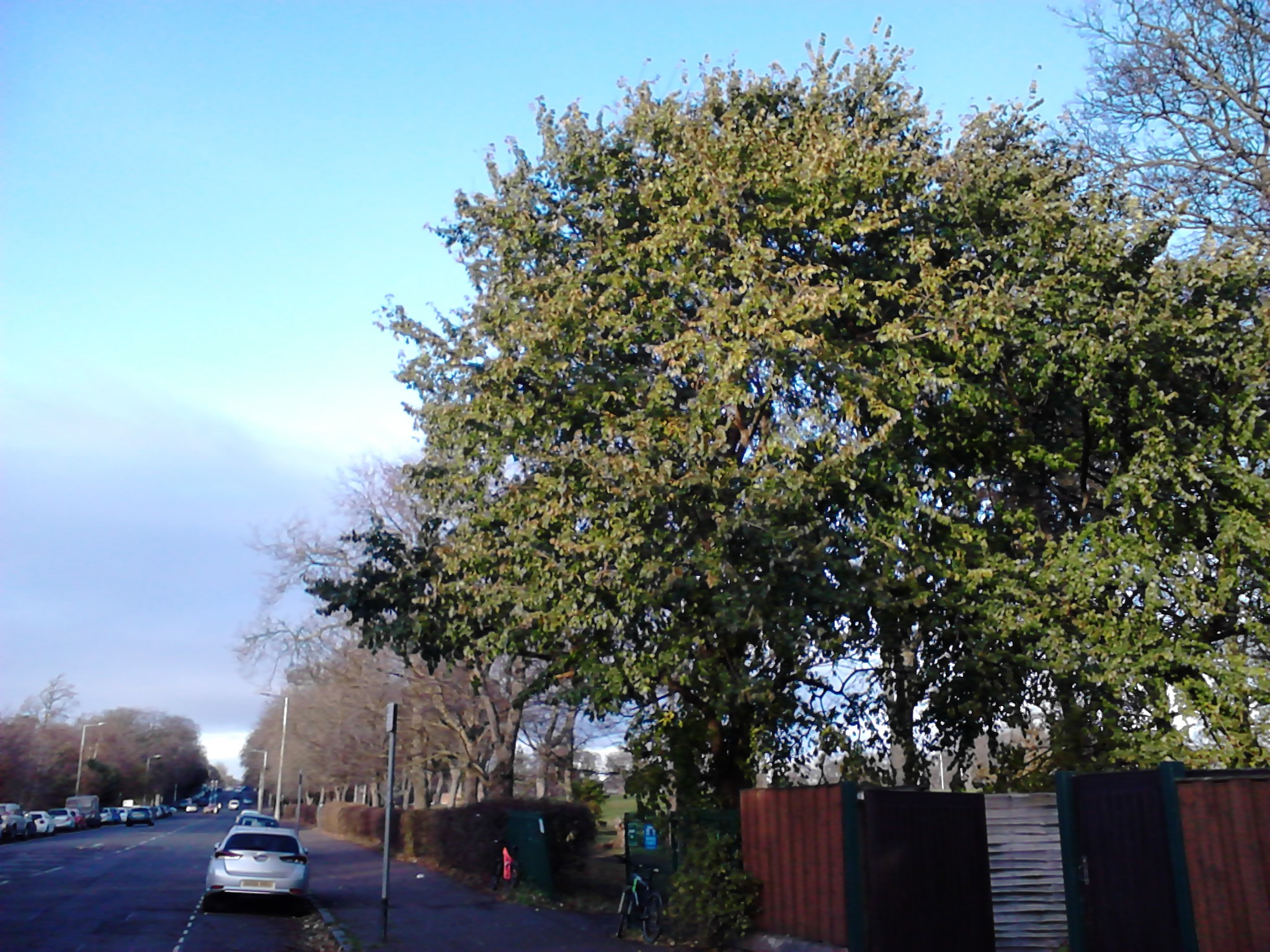
Dark-leaved hybrid elm, early winter, SW corner of Inverleith Park, Edinburgh

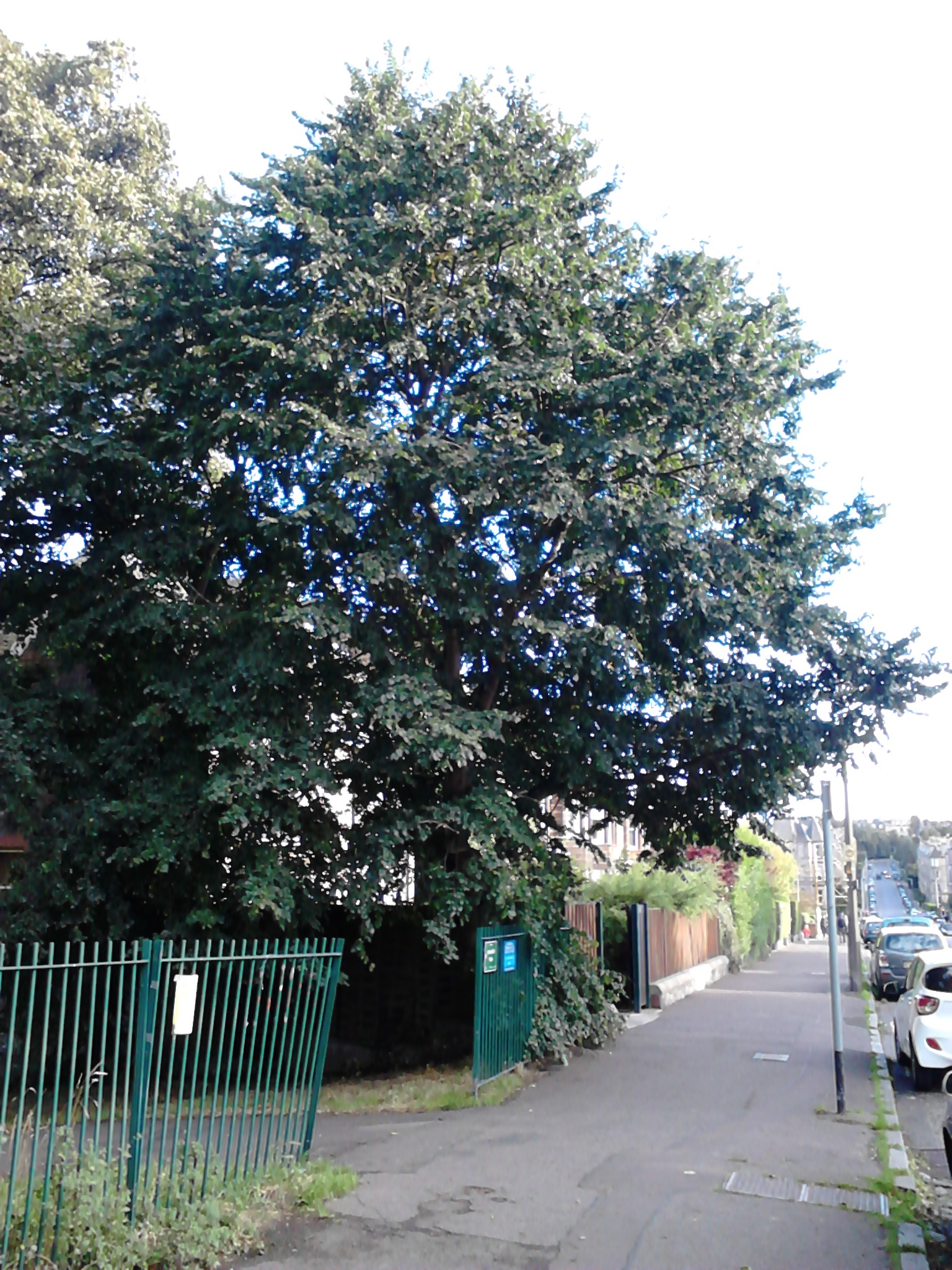
Same, late summer

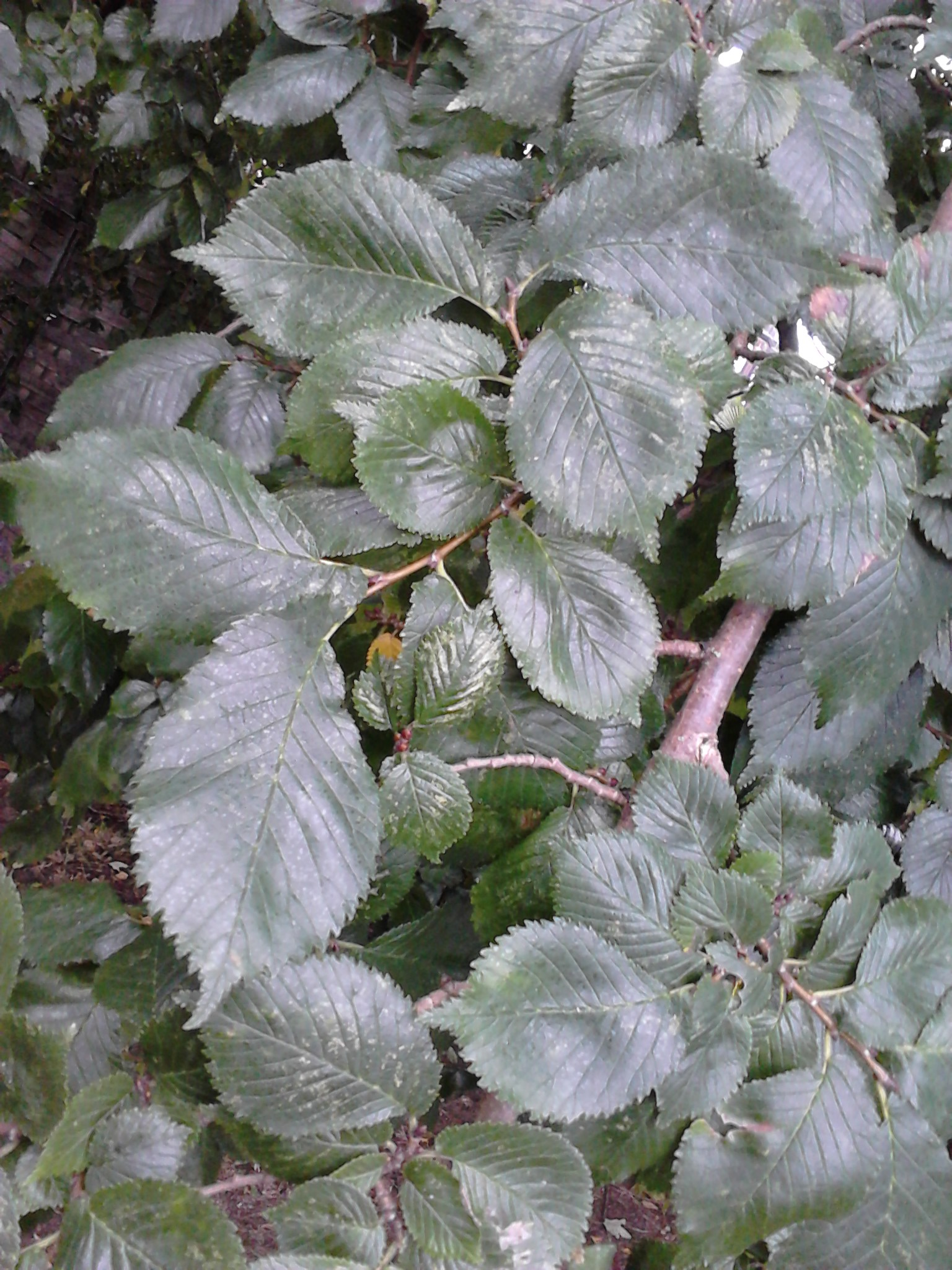
Leaves of same

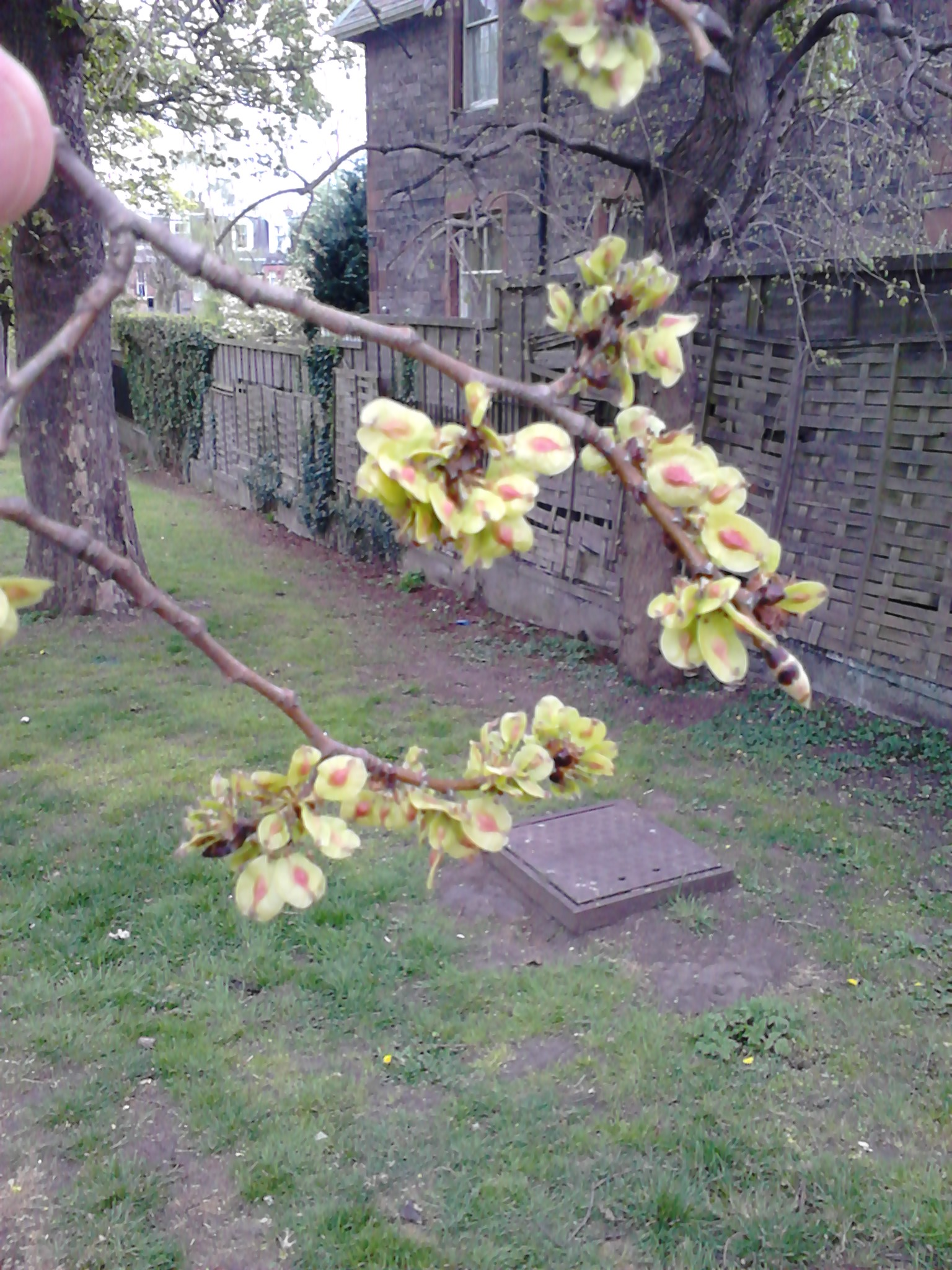
Samarae

== Synonymy ==
- Ulmus scabra (: glabra) purpurea nigricans: Dieck, (Zöschen, Germany), Haupt-catalog der Obst- und gehölzbaumschulen des ritterguts Zöschen bei Merseburg 1885, p. 82.
