= Édouard-Christophe Pynaert =

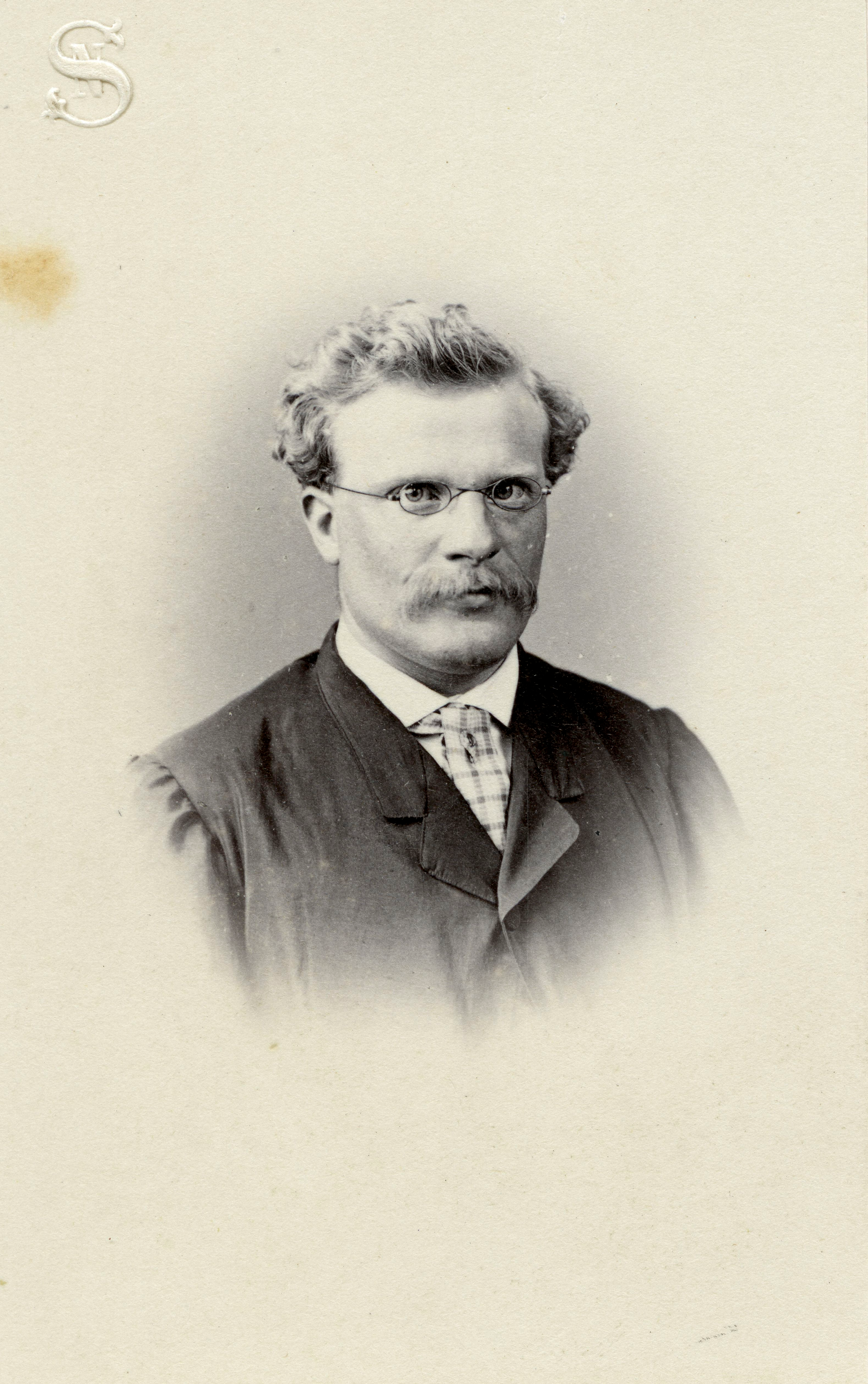

Édouard-Christophe Pynaert (29 May 1835 – 28 October 1900) was a Belgian botanist and horticulturalist born in Ghent. He was a specialist in the field of pomology.

He studied at a local gardening school, and from 1861 was a professor at the school of horticulture in Gentbrugge. He is said to have species of grass named after him, although many of the plant species from Africa named pynaertii actually honour Léon Auguste Edouard Joseph Pynaert (1876–1968), his son.

He was co-editor of several periodicals, including Flore des Serres et des Jardins, Revue de l'Horticulture Belge and the Bulletin d'Arboriculture.

== Selected publications ==
- Traité de la culture forcée et artificielle des arbres fruitiers, (Ghent 1861, 4th edition 1888).
- Arboriculture fruitière en Danemark, (Ghent 1866/67).
- La culture de la vigne en serres et sous verre (translation of Archibald F Barron's Vines and vine culture), (1900).
