= Ludwig Beissner =

German horticulturalist and dendrologist

Ludwig Beissner (6 July 1843 – 21 December 1927) was a German horticulturalist and dendrologist born in Ludwigslust, Mecklenburg-Schwerin.

From 1887 to 1913, Beissner was inspector of the botanical gardens of Bonn. He was an author of a popular textbook on hardwoods ("Handbuch der Laubholz-Benenung") and on a study of softwoods ("Handbuch der Nadelholzkunde"), the latter work being published over three editions (1891, 1909 and 1930).

== Published works ==
- Handbuch der Coniferen-Benennung : Systematische Einteilung der Coniferen und Aufzählung aller in Deutschland, 1887 – Handbook of conifer designation, etc.
- Handbuch der Laubholz-Benenung. Systematische und alphabetische Liste aller in Deutschland ohne oder unter leichtem Schutz im freien Lande ausdauernden Laubholzarten und Formen mit ihren Synonymen, 1903 – Handbook of hardwood designation, etc. (with Ernst Schelle and Hermann Zabel).
- Handbuch der Nadelholzkunde; Systematik, Beschreibung, Verwendung und Kultur der Ginkgoaceen, Freiland-koniferen und Gnetaceen, für Gärtner, Forstbeamte und Botaniker, 1930 – Handbook of softwood studies; systematics, description, uses and cultivation of Ginkgoaceae, open country conifers and Gnetaceae for gardeners, forestry officials and botanists' (with Jost Fitschen, Heinrich Klebahn & H Luyken).
