= Ernst Schelle =

German botanist

Ernst Schelle (1864–1945) was a German botanist who specialized in cacti. He was employed as Inspector of the botanical gardens in Tübingen. The grass species Helictotrichon schellianum (Hack.) Kitag. is named for him.

== Publications ==
- Handbuch der Laubholz-Benenung, 1903 (with Ludwig Beissner, Hermann Zabel) – Handbook of deciduous tree designation.
- Handbuch der kakteenkultur: Kurze beschreibung der meisten gegenwärtig im handel befindlichen kakteen, nebst angabe zu deren pflege. Für gärtner und kakteenliebhaber zusammengestellt, 1907 – Handbook of cacti culture, etc.
- Die winterharten Nadelhölzer Mitteleuropas, 1909 – Hardy conifers of mid-Europe.
- Der Blumengarten. Anleitung zur Anlage, Bepflanzung und Pflege eines einfachen Ziergartens, 1912 – The flower garden. Instructions for installation, planting and maintenance of a simple decorative garden.
- Wörterbuch der botanischen Kunstsprache für Gärtner, Gartenfreunde und Gartenbauzöglinge, 1912 (with Karl Salomon) – Dictionary of botanical technical language for gardeners, garden lovers and horticulture students.
- Botanisches und gärtnerisches Wörterbuch, 1921 (with Karl Salomon) – Botanical and gardening dictionary.
- Kakteen: Kurze Beschreibung nebst Angaben über die Kultur der gegenwärtig im Handel befindlichen Arten und Formen, 1926 – Cacti. Brief description along with information on the culture of types and forms, etc.
