= List of elm cultivars, hybrids and hybrid cultivars =

The starting-points for List of elm cultivars, hybrids and hybrid cultivars were fourfold: (1) Green's 'Registration of Cultivar Names in Ulmus ' (1964), based on the contemporary nomenclature of elm species and wild hybrids; (2) Krüssmann's confirmation or correction of cultivar-names in his monumental Handbuch der Laubgehölze (1976); (3) Heybroek's table of Netherlands research clones in his essay 'Resistant elms for Europe' (1983; updated to include North American cultivars, 1996); and (4) Santamour and Bentz's 'Updated Checklist of Elm (Ulmus) Cultivars for use in North America' (1995). Since the 1990s there have been many new cultivars, some 'disease-resistant', either species cultivars (e.g. U. americana 'New Harmony') or cultivars with complex hybrid origins, the subject of ongoing trials. Information on these is taken from post-1990 scientific papers (see 'Further reading' below), pteleologists' articles, and updated handbooks. There has not yet (2024) been a single recent collation comparable to Green's.

Green and Krüssmann acknowledged their debt to Rehder's list of elm-cultivar synonyms (1949), and to Schneider (1906), but the digitisation of older dendrologies, handbooks, and nursery-catalogues added cultivars and cultivation information missed or omitted by these four authorities. (Note: Among extant cultivars missing from Green and Krüssmann are U. glabra Huds. 'Superba' Blandford elm, the largest-leaved wych cultivar; U. glabra Huds. 'Concavaefolia', formerly U. montana var. cucullata, a 'boat'-leaved wych; U. × hollandica 'Canadian Giant', present in quantity in Victoria, Australia; U. × hollandica 'Viminalis' Späth, a narrow-leaved hybrid; Nottingham elm, discussed by Richens (1983); and U. pumila 'Pendula' Meyer, Dragon's Claw elm from northern China.) The list below makes good some of these omissions, additions justified by the survival of extensive elm collections in disease-control locations such as Edinburgh (known to have been stocked from one such nursery), Brighton, Sweden, and New Zealand. Australia remains disease-free (2024) and has in quantity both well-known clones (e.g. 'Lutescens') and at least one old cultivar missed by Green and Krüssmann ('Canadian Giant'), as well as others that do not match European 'types'. "Deliberate planting of selected clones," wrote Spencer (1995) "combined with chance hybridisation, has resulted in a mix of elms [in Australia] rather different from that in England" (see Elms in Australia).

The older elm cultivars (sometimes called 'varieties') usually bore simple descriptive Latin names (e.g. 'Tortuosa', 'Argenteo-Variegata', 'Stricta') under their contemporary species headings, or, later, under hybrid headings, as hybrids were then understood. Early lists, with no more information than this, abound, and are a further source for the articles listed below; one of the fullest is, e.g., Beissner's (1903). Amongst the more discursive treatments, however, that included cultivation-history and subjective comment (and sometimes illustrations), used in articles in this list, were those of Loudon (1838) and Elwes and Henry (1913) in the UK, Browne in USA (1851), Petzold in Germany (1864), and Fontaine in the Netherlands (1965). These more discursive and subjective dendrologists are frequently cited in the articles listed below for information that would have been out of place in Green and Krüssmann.

The turn of the 20th century was the heyday of ornamental elm cultivation, (Note: A 1905 survey of tree types along main roads in Belgium found that of the 806,985 trees counted, 294,725 were elms, the most numerous genus. Elwes & Henry (1913), p.1870, note) and Green noted that many cultivars had been inadequately described or illustrated before they were almost wiped out by the catastrophes of two Dutch elm disease epidemics and two world wars. Some had been described only from juvenile specimens whose ultimate size was unknown (e.g. U. minor 'Umbraculifera Gracilis' Späth). The digitisation of university and arboretum herbarium specimens, however, (leaves and fruit), bearing original labels, – a process more advanced, by the 2020s, in European and American collections than in those of the UK, – and of old photographs of known cultivar-locations (see e.g. 'Atropurpurea'), has confirmed or supplemented the descriptions in many of the listed items. 'Lost' cultivars identified by Royal Botanic Garden Edinburgh since 2016 through such old planting-location information, and through herbarium specimens, – and returned to cultivation, – include U. × hollandica 'Wentworthii Pendula', U. minor 'Umbraculifera Gracilis' Späth, and U. glabra 'Concavaefolia'.

Until the early 20th century, both wych cultivars and those of large-leaved European hybrids were often classified as Ulmus montana. The likely hybrid origin of some of the latter had, however, long been suspected, English carpenters for example referring to their 'Dutch elm' as 'bastard elm', while nurserymen knew that popular cultivars like 'Belgica' and 'Vegeta' could be raised reliably only by vegetative propagation or cloning, their seedlings not coming true to type. Not all hybrid elms planted in towns, therefore, were, strictly speaking, cultivars: some may have been one-off seedlings, unique genotypes, never repropagated vegetatively. (The same applies to species seedlings, for example non-cultivar wych planted in towns.) The nomenclature of hybrids was systematised by the mid-20th century. Research leading to the selection and breeding of cultivars resistant to Dutch elm disease was under way in the Netherlands from the 1920s, in the US from the 1930s, in Italy from the 1970s, and in Spain from the 1990s.

== Species cultivars ==
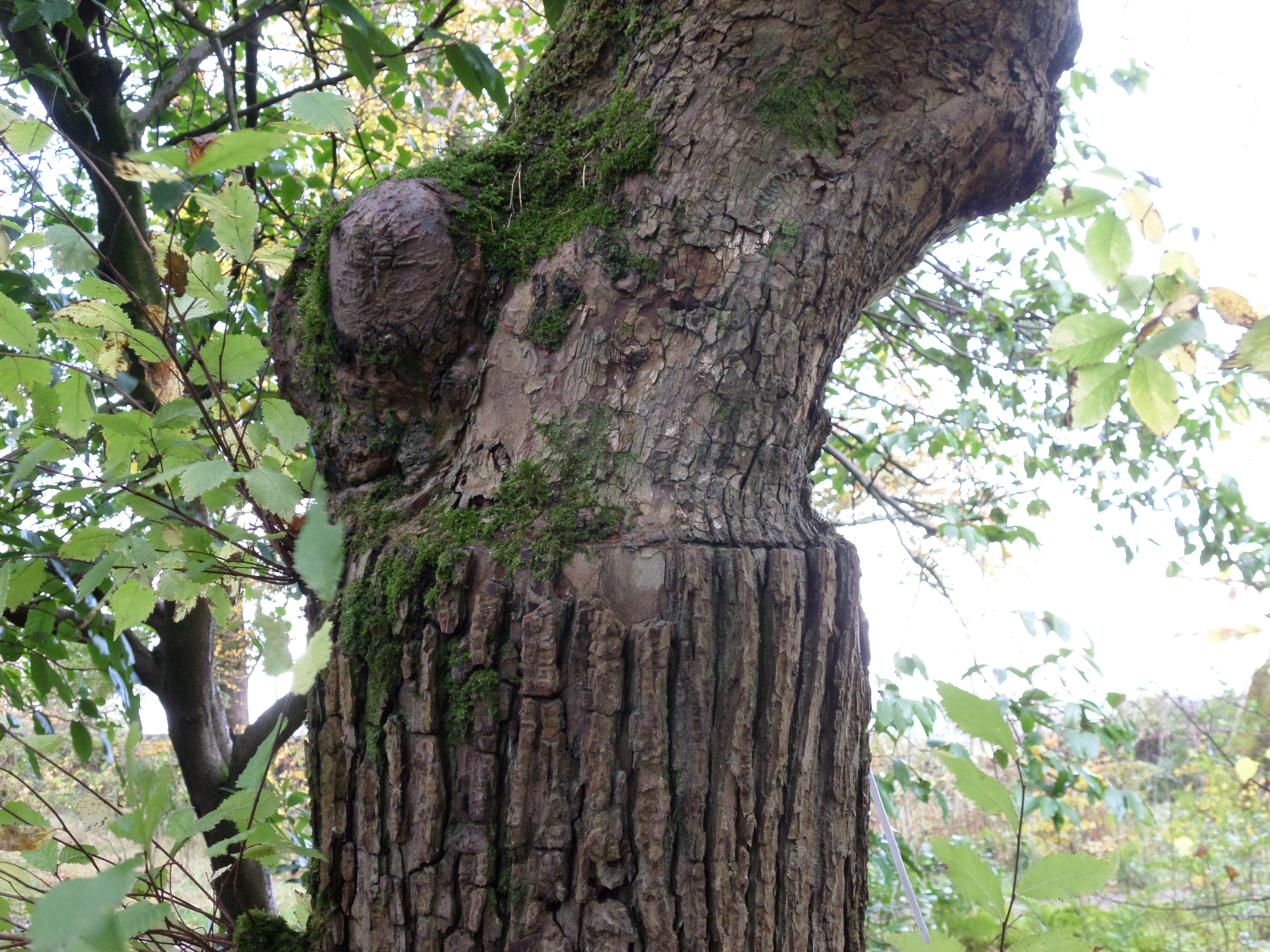
A weeping elm graft.

=== Ulmus alata ===
- Lace Parasol
- UAMTF = Kalysta

=== Ulmus americana ===
- American Liberty
- Ascendens
- Augustine
- Aurea
- Beaverlodge
- Beebe's Weeping
- Brandon
- Burgoyne
- College
- Columnaris
- Creole Queen
- Deadfree
- Delaware
- Endurance
- Exhibition
- Fiorei
- Flicks Spreader
- Folia Aurea Variegata
- Great Plains
- Hines
- Incisa
- Independence
- Iowa State
- Jackson
- Jefferson
- JFS-Prince II = Colonial Spirit
- Kimley
- Klehmii
- L'Assomption
- Lake City
- Lewis & Clark = Prairie Expedition
- Littleford
- Maine
- Markham
- Miller Park
- Minneapolis Park
- Moline
- Morden
- New Harmony
- Nigricans
- Patmore
- Pendula
- Penn Treaty
- Princeton
- Pyramidata
- Queen City
- Sheyenne
- Skinner Upright
- St. Croix
- Star
- Valley Forge
- Variegata
- Vase
- Washington

=== Ulmus chenmoui ===
JAB Morton = Summer Elixir

=== Ulmus crassifolia ===
Brazos Rim

=== Ulmus davidiana var. japonica ===
- Burgundy Glow = Northern Empress
- Discovery
- JFS-Bieberich = Emerald Sunshine
- JFS-KW2UD = Greenstone
- Jacan
- Jeffree = Freedom
- Mitsui Centennial
- Prospector
- Reperta
- Reseda
- Thomson
- Validation

=== Ulmus glabra ===
- Albo-Variegata
- Australis
- Camperdownii
- Cebennensis
- Concavaefolia
- Cornuta
- Corylifolia Purpurea
- Corylifolia
- Fastigiata Macrophylla
- Fastigiata Stricta
- Fastigiata Variegata
- Firma
- Flava
- Gigantea
- Gittisham
- Grandidentata
- Holgeri
- Horizontalis
- Insularis
- Latifolia
- Latifolia Aurea
- Latifolia Aureo-Variegata
- Latifolia Nigricans
- Luteo Variegata
- Lutescens
- Macrophylla
- Maculata
- Minor
- Nana
- Nitida
- Nigra
- Oblongata
- Pendula Macrophylla
- Pendula Variegata
- Pyrenaica
- Spectabilis
- Superba
- Tomentosa

=== Ulmus laevis ===
- Aureovariegata
- Colorans
- Hardingen
- Helena
- Ornata
- Pendula
- Punctata
- Urticifolia
- Westland

=== Ulmus minor ===
- Albo-Dentata
- Amplifolia
- Argenteo-Variegata
- Atinia
- Atinia Pyramidalis
- Atinia Variegata
- Bea Schwarz
- Betulaefolia
- Biltii
- Concavaefolia
- Coritana
- Cloud Corky
- Cretensis
- Cucullata
- Cucullata Variegata
- Dehesa de la Villa
- Dicksonii
- Dijkwel
- Erecta
- Folia Alba-Punctata
- Glandulosa
- Goodyeri
- Hoersholmiensis
- Holmstruph
- Hunnybunii
- Hunnybunii pseudo-Stricta
- Jos van Slycken
- Laciniata
- Lanuginosa
- Microphylla Pendula
- Microphylla Purpurea
- Microphylla Rubra
- Monumentalis
- Pendula
- Picturata
- Plotii
- Propendens
- Punctata
- Purpurascens
- Purpurea
- Retiro
- Reverti
- Rugosa
- Rueppellii
- Sarniensis
- Schuurhoek
- Silvery Gem
- Sowerbyi
- Stricta
- Suberosa
- Umbraculifera
- Umbraculifera Gracilis
- Viminalis
- Viminalis Aurea
- Viminalis Betulaefolia
- Viminalis Gracilis
- Viminalis Incisa
- Viminalis Marginata
- Viminalis Pendula
- Viminalis Pulverulenta
- Viminalis Stricta
- Virgata
- Webbiana

=== Ulmus parvifolia ===
- A. Ross Central Park = Central Park Splendor
- BSNUPF = Everclear
- Blizzard
- Burgundy
- Burnley Select
- Catlin
- Chessins
- Churchyard
- Cork Bark
- D.B.Cole
- Drake
- Dynasty
- Ed Wood
- Elsmo
- Emer I or Emerald Isle = Athena
- Emer II or Emerald Vase = Allee
- Emerald Prairie
- Frosty
- Garden City Clone
- Geisha
- Glory
- Golden Rey
- Hallelujah
- Harzam = Harrison
- Hokkaido
- Jade Empress
- King's Choice
- Littleleaf
- Lois Hole
- Matthew
- Milliken
- Nire-keyaki
- Ohio
- Orange Ribbon
- Pathfinder
- Pendens
- Prairie Shade
- Prince Richard
- Red Fall
- Sabamiki
- Sagei
- Seiju
- Select 380
- Sempervirens
- Small Frye
- State Fair
- Stone's Dwarf
- Taiwan
- The Thinker
- Todd
- True Green
- UPMTF = Bosque
- Ware's
- Yarralumla
- Yatsubusa
- Zettler = Heritage

=== Ulmus pumila ===
- Ansaloni
- Aurea = Beijing Gold
- Aurescens
- Chinkota
- Dropmore
- Dwarf Weeper
- Green King
- Hansen
- Harbin
- Manchu
- Mauro
- Mopheads
- Mr. Buzz
- Park Royal
- Pendula
- Pinnato-ramosa
- Poort Bulten
- Puszta
- Pyramidalis Fiorei
- Zhonghua Jinye

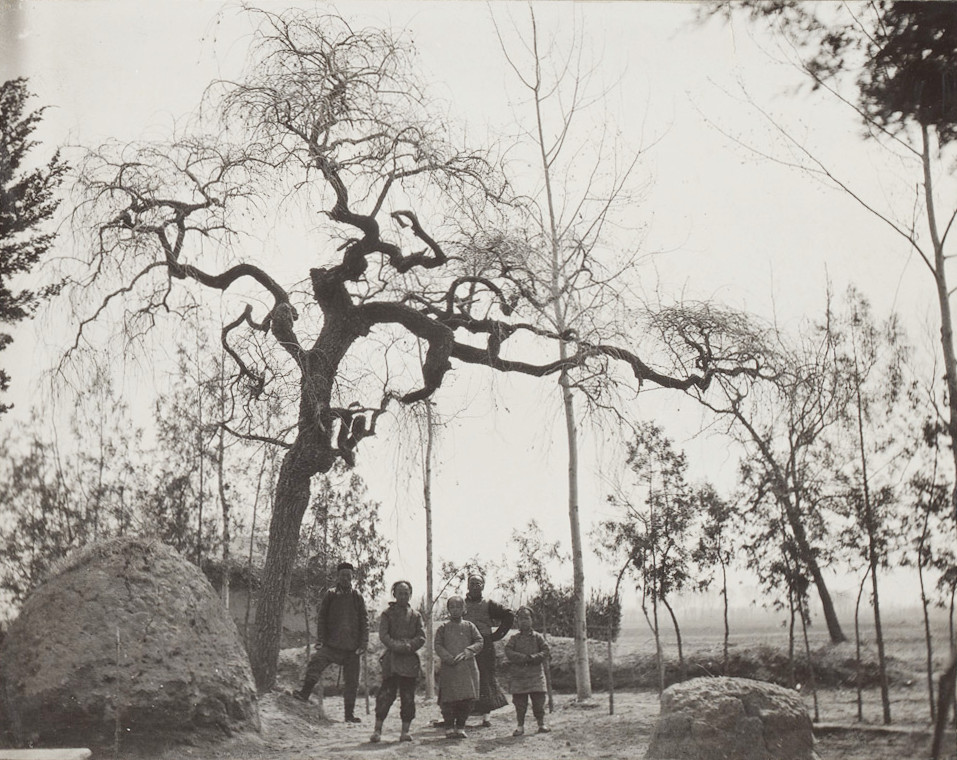
'Dragon's Claw elm', an old Chinese clone still in cultivation (1908)

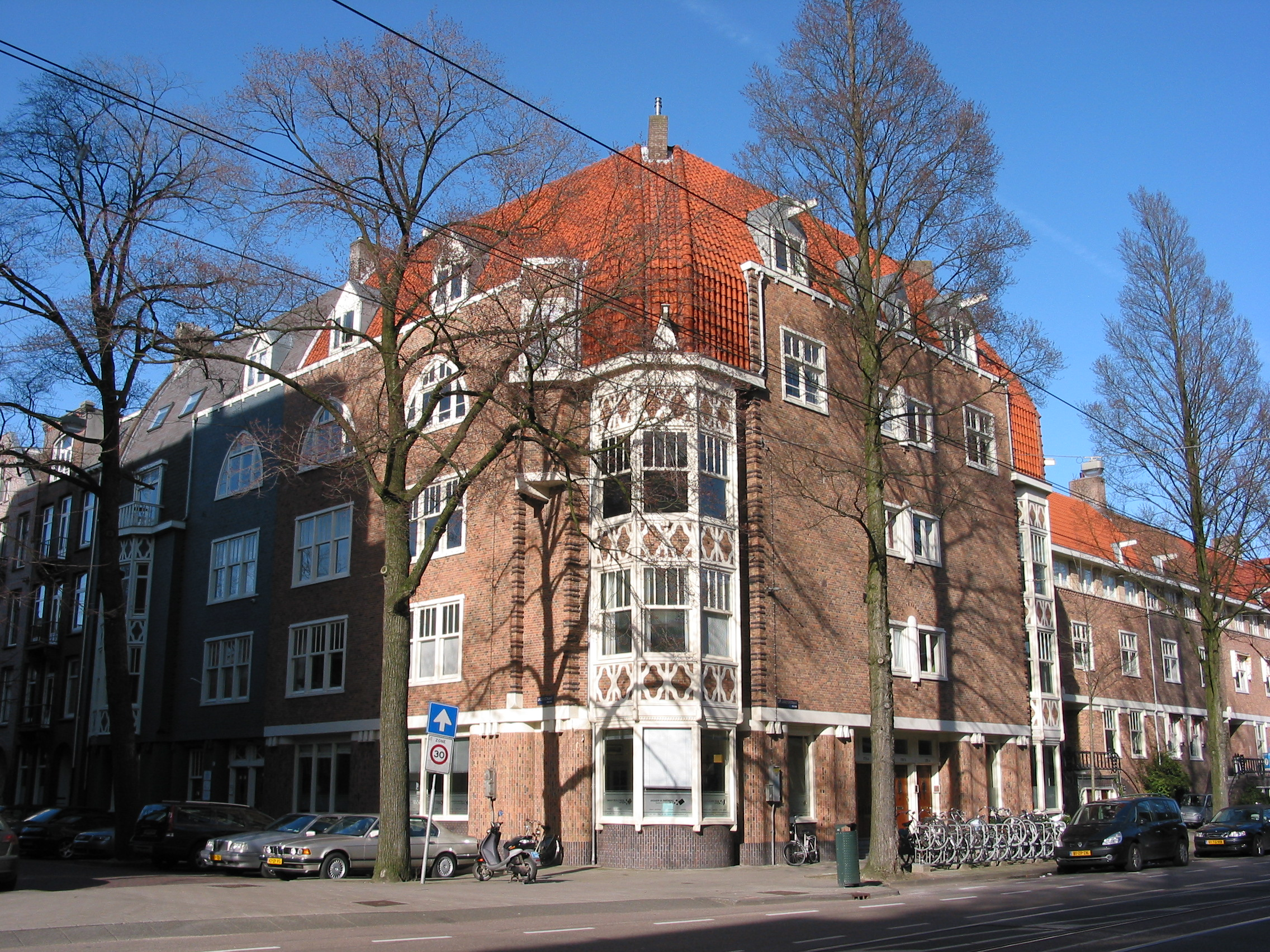
Ulmus × hollandica 'Belgica' left, Ulmus minor 'Sarniensis' right.

== Hybrids and hybrid cultivars ==
=== Ulmus × arbuscula ===
U. glabra × U. pumila. Russia

=== Ulmus × arkansana ===
U. serotina × U. crassifolia. US

=== Ulmus × brandisiana ===
U. chumlia × U. wallichiana. India, Pakistan

=== Ulmus davidiana var. japonica × U. minor ===
Ulmus davidiana var. japonica × U. minor. US

=== Ulmus × diversifolia ===
U. glabra × U. minor 'Coritana' × U. minor 'Plotii'. UK

=== Ulmus × hollandica ===
U. glabra × U. minor. [Dutch Elm, (US) Netherland Elm.] Europe

- Ademuz
- Alba
- Angustifolia
- Balder
- Belgica
- Blandford
- Canadian Giant
- Cicestria
- Cinerea
- Commelin
- Dampieri
- Dauvessei
- Daveyi
- Dehesa de Amaniel
- Dovaei
- Dumont
- Elegantissima
- Eleganto-Variegata
- Etrusca
- Fastigiata
- Fjerrestad
- Folia Rhomboidea
- Freja
- Fulva
- Gaujardii
- Groeneveld
- Haarlemensis
- Klemmer
- Loke
- Macrophylla Aurea
- Majadahonda
- Major
- Microphylla
- Modiolina
- Muscaviensis
- Nottingham
- Odin
- Pioneer
- Pitteurs
- Serpentina
- Smithii
- Superba
- Tricolor
- Tyr
- Vegeta
- Viminalis
- Viscosa
- Wentworthii Pendula
- Wredei
- Ypreau
var. insularum

=== Ulmus × intermedia ===
Ulmus pumila × Ulmus rubra. US

- Coolshade
- Improved Coolshade
- Fremont
- Lincoln
- Rosehill
- Willis

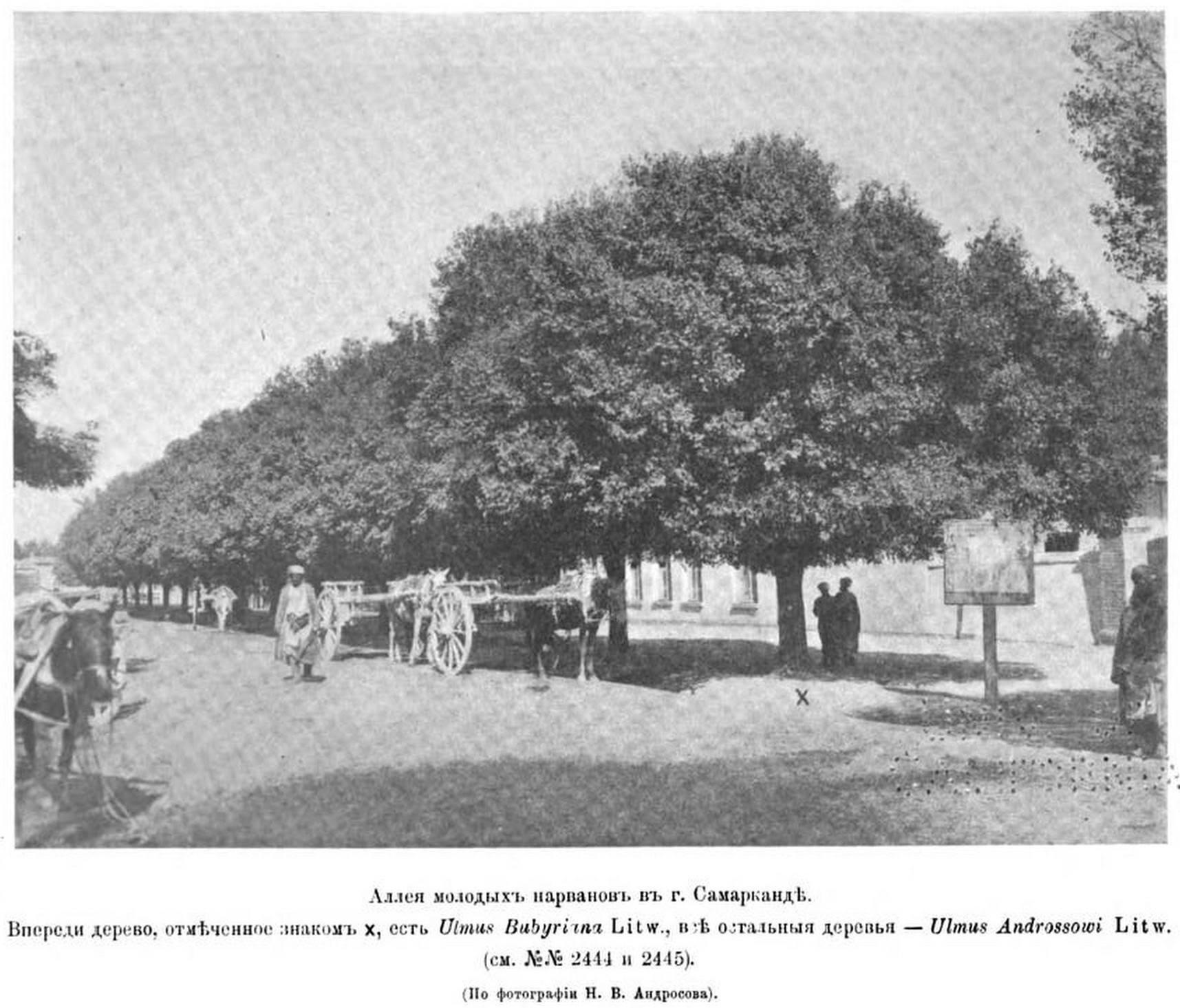
Two important old cultivars of Central Asia: 'Androssowii' left, 'Umbraculifera' right, Samarkand (1903)

=== Ulmus × mesocarpa ===
U. macrocarpa × U. davidiana var. japonica. Korea

=== Ulmus × androssowii ===
U. minor × U. pumila. Central Asia, Spain, Italy

- Androssowii
- Fiorente
- Fuente Umbria
- Karagatch
- Recerta
- Toledo

== Complex hybrids and other crossings ==
- Ulmus 'Amsterdam'. 'Bea Schwarz' × U. minor. Netherlands, before 1950.
- Ulmus 'Arno'. 'Plantyn' × U. pumila. Italy, 2006.
- Ulmus 'Cathedral'. U. davidiana var. japonica × U. pumila. US, 1994.
- Ulmus 'Charisma': See under 'Morton Glossy' = Triumph
- Ulmus 'Clusius'. ('Exoniensis' × U. wallichiana) × 'Bea Schwarz' selfed. Netherlands, 1983.
- Ulmus 'Columella'. 'Plantyn' × U. minor. Netherlands, 1992.
- Ulmus 'Curro'. U. minor R1 × U. minor S22. Spain, 2022.
- Ulmus 'Den Haag'. U. pumila × 'Belgica'. Netherlands, 1936.
- Ulmus 'Dodoens'. ('Exoniensis' × U. wallichiana) selfed. Netherlands, 1973.
- Ulmus 'Endeavor'. (U. americana × U. davidiana var. japonica) . US, 2022.
- Ulmus 'Europa'. ((U. glabra × U. minor) × 'Commelin'). Netherlands, 2021.
- Ulmus 'Fagel'. (U. wallichiana × ‘Commelin’) × (‘Dodoens’ × (U. glabra × U. minor)). Netherlands, 2021.
- Ulmus 'Frontier'. U. minor × U. parvifolia. US, 1990.
- Ulmus 'Klondike'. 'Plantyn' × 'Wredei'. Netherlands, 2021.
- Ulmus 'Homestead'. U. pumila × ('Commelin' × (U. pumila × 'Hoersholmiensis')). US, 1984.
- Ulmus 'Lobel'. ('Exoniensis' × U. wallichiana) × 'Bea Schwarz' selfed. Netherlands, 1973.
- Ulmus 'Marga'. U. minor R2 × U. minor S32. Spain, 2022.
- Ulmus 'Morfeo'. (U. × hollandica × U. minor) × U. chenmoui. Italy, 2010.
- Ulmus 'Morton' = Accolade. U. davidiana var. japonica × U. davidiana var. japonica. US, 2000.
- Ulmus 'Morton Glossy' = Triumph. 'Morton' = Accolade × 'Morton Plainsman' = Vanguard. US, 2000.
- Ulmus 'Morton Plainsman' = Vanguard. U. pumila × U. davidiana var. japonica. US, 2000.
- Ulmus 'Morton Red Tip' = Danada Charm. 'Morton' = Accolade open pollination. US, circa 2000.
- Ulmus 'Morton Stalwart' = Commendation. 'Morton' = Accolade × (U. pumila × U. minor). US, 2000.
- Ulmus 'Nanguen' = Lutèce. 'Plantyn' × ('Bea Schwarz' × 'Bea Schwarz' selfed). Netherlands, 2002.
- Ulmus 'New Horizon'. U. davidiana var. japonica 'Reseda' × U. pumila W426. US, 1994.
- Ulmus 'Night Rider'. 'Sapporo Autumn Gold' × U. davidiana var. japonica. Canada, 2020.
- Ulmus 'Patriot'. 'Urban' × 'Prospector'. US, 1993.
- Ulmus 'Plantyn' or 'Plantijn'. ('Exoniensis' × U. wallichiana) × (U. minor × U. minor) . Netherlands, 1973.
- Ulmus 'Plinio'. 'Plantyn' × U. pumila. Italy, 2002.
- Ulmus 'Rageth'. US, before 1954.
- Ulmus 'Rebella'. U. parvifolia × U. americana. US, 2011.
- Ulmus 'Rebona'. U. davidiana var. japonica 'Reseda' × U. pumila W426. US, 1993.
- Ulmus 'Regal'. 'Commelin' × Dutch clone '215' (U. pumila × 'Hoersholmiensis'). US, 1983.
- Ulmus 'Repura'. 'Regal' × (U. rubra × (U. pumila × U. davidiana var. japonica)). US, 1993.
- Ulmus 'Revera'. 'Regal' × (U. rubra × (U. pumila × U. davidiana var. japonica)). US, 1993.
- Ulmus 'San Zanobi'. 'Plantyn' × U. pumila. Italy, 2002.
- Ulmus 'Sapporo Autumn Gold'. U. davidiana var. japonica × U. pumila. US, 1975.
- Ulmus 'Sapporo Gold 2' (Resista). U. davidiana var. japonica × U. pumila. US, 1990.
- Ulmus 'Stavast'. ('Exoniensis' × U. wallichiana) × 'Commelin'. Netherlands, c.1985.
- Ulmus 'Urban'. Dutch clone '148' ('Vegeta' × U. minor) × U. pumila. US, 1976.
- Ulmus 'Wanoux' = Vada. 'Plantyn' × 'Plantyn' selfed. Netherlands, 2006.
- Ulmus 'Wingham'. (((U. wallichiana × U. minor) × (U. pumila × U. minor)) o.p. × (U. × hollandica ‘Vegeta’ × U. minor)) o.p. UK, 2019.
- and others without formal hybrid names.

== Cultivars of unconfirmed derivation ==
- Acutifolia
- Alata
- Alksuth
- Argenteo-Marginata
- Aspera
- Atropurpurea
- Australis
- Berardii
- Betulaefolia Nigrescens
- Crispa
- Crispa Aurea
- Crispa Pendula
- Densa
- Escaillard
- Exoniensis
- Fastigiata Glabra
- Folia Aurea
- Folia Rubra
- Folia Variegata Pendula
- Gallica
- Glabra
- Globosa
- Hamburg
- Hertfordensis Angustifolia
- Hertfordensis Latifolia
- Heyderi
- Hillieri
- Jacqueline Hillier
- Jalaica
- Kansas Hybrid
- Klemmer Blanc
- Koopmannii
- Lombartsii
- Louis van Houtte
- Marmorata
- Monstrosa
- Myrtifolia
- Myrtifolia Purpurea
- Nemoralis
- Nigrescens
- Planeroides
- Planifolia
- Purpurea
- Pyramidalis Bertini
- Ramulosa
- Rotundifolia
- Rubra
- Rufa
- Rugosa
- Scampstoniensis
- Sericea
- Tiliaefolia
- Tortuosa
- Turkestanica
- Variegata Nova
- Virens

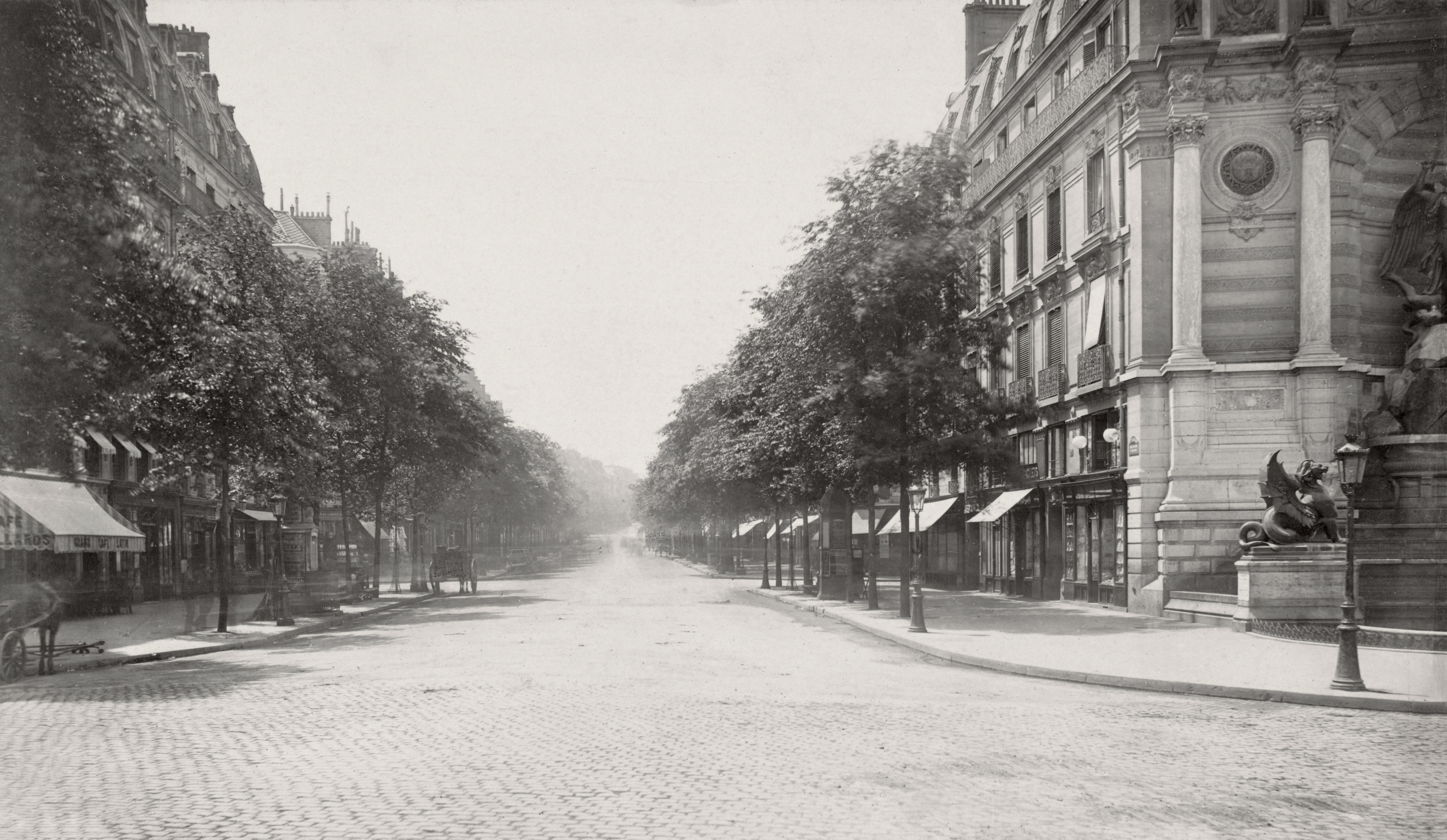
Elm avenue, Boulevard Saint-Michel, Paris, late 19th century

== Others ==
- aff. 'Plotii'
- Ulmus of King & Co

== Misidentified genus ==
- Pitteurs Pendula

== See also ==
- Lists of cultivars
- National Elm Trial
