= Spectabilis =

Spectabilis may refer to:

- vir spectabilis, a senatorial rank in ancient Rome
- Ulmus glabra 'Spectabilis', an elm cultivar
