= Ulmus americana 'Pyramidata' =

Elm cultivar

- Species: Ulmus americana
- Cultivar: 'Pyramidata'
- Origin: Baudriller Nursery, Angers, France

The supposed American elm cultivar Ulmus americana 'Pyramidata' was a Belgian clone listed by Wesmael in Bulletin de la Fédération des sociétés d'horticulture de Belgique, 1862, as Ulmus Americana pyramidalis Hort. (with a capital "A"). It was marketed by the Baudriller nursery, Angers, France, and appeared in their catalogue of 1880 as U. Americana pyramidata. Wesmael's Ulmus americana and Ulmus americana var. variegata, however, do not appear from herbarium specimens to have been American white elm (see Ulmus americana 'Variegata'). It is known that nurseries in Europe and America marketed the golden wych elm Ulmus glabra 'Lutescens' as Ulmus americana aurea, so it is possible that Wesmael's Ulmus americana pyramidalis was similarly misnamed.

== Description ==
The clone was pyramid-shaped.

== Cultivation ==
No specimens are known to survive.

== Synonymy ==
- Ulmus americana var. pyramidalis: Wesmael, Bulletin de la Fédération des sociétés d'horticulture de Belgique 1862: 387, 1863.
