= Ulmus glabra 'Maculata' =

Elm cultivar

- Species: Ulmus glabra
- Cultivar: 'Maculata'
- Origin: France

The Wych Elm cultivar Ulmus glabra 'Maculata' was listed as Ulmus scabra maculata in the 1831-1832 catalogue from the Audibert brothers' nursery at Tonelle, near Tarascon in France.

== Description ==
Audibert described the tree as having spotted leaves.

== Cultivation ==
No specimens are known to survive.
