= Ulmus 'Nemoralis' =

Elm cultivar

- Genus: Ulmus
- Cultivar: 'Nemoralis'
- Origin: Germany?

The elm cultivar Ulmus 'Nemoralis' was listed by Schelle in Beissner et al. (1903), as U. campestris f. nemoralis Hort. Considered "possibly U. carpinifolia (: minor)" by Green.

A sessile-flowering Ulmus nemoralis "from North America" was described by Dumont de Courset in Le botaniste cultivateur (1811), and another, "des bois d'amérique", in the 1831-1832 catalogue of the Audibert brothers' nursery at Tonelle, near Tarascon in France. A Paris herbarium specimen of the latter from the 1830s does not appear to show an American species. European elm cultivars were sometimes referred to by nurseries as "American", probably for marketing reasons (other examples are 'Scampstoniensis', 'Vegeta', 'Lutescens', 'Canadensis', and 'Nana').

== Description ==
Courset's U. nemoralis had oblong, almost smooth, regularly toothed leaves, and sessile flowers. A Ukrainian herbarium specimen labelled U. nemoralis, possibly erroneously, shows Zelkova × verschaffeltii-like leaves.

== Cultivation ==
The tree is not known to remain in cultivation.
