= Ulmus 'Revera' =

Elm cultivar

- Genus: Ulmus
- Hybrid parentage: 'Regal' × (U. rubra × (U. pumila × U. davidiana var. japonica))
- Cultivar: 'Revera'
- Origin: US

Ulmus 'Revera' is an American hybrid cultivar raised by the Wisconsin Alumni Research Foundation (WARF) as selection '1193-3' which, like 'Reperta', was derived from a crossing of 'Regal' (female parent) with a crossing of Ulmus rubra and the hybrid Ulmus pumila × Ulmus davidiana var. japonica.

== Description ==
Not available.

== Pests and diseases ==
'Revera' has a resistance to Dutch elm disease.

== Cultivation ==
The tree was registered in 1993 as 'Revera' by Conrad Appel KG, of Darmstadt, Germany, but has yet to be commercially released in either the United States or Europe.

== Accessions ==
Not known.
