= Ulmus 'Sapporo Gold 2' =

Elm cultivar

- Genus: Ulmus
- Hybrid parentage: U. pumila × U. davidiana var. japonica
- Cultivar: 'Sapporo Gold' Resista
- Origin: US

Ulmus 'Sapporo Gold 2' (Resista) is an elm cultivar raised by the Wisconsin Alumni Research Foundation (WARF), United States, but only registered and released to commerce in Europe.

== Description ==
Very vigorous and rather unruly, maintaining a clean stem has proven difficult, effectively disqualifying 'Sapporo Gold' for street use, consequently it is now promoted primarily as a hedgerow tree. The foliage is similar to 'Sapporo Autumn Gold', which has the same parentage.

== Pests and diseases ==
'Sapporo Gold 2' (Resista) has a high resistance to Dutch elm disease.

== Cultivation ==
The tree was registered in 1990 as 'Sapporo Gold 2' (Resista) and has been marketed as a hedging plant ever since.

== Accessions ==
=== Europe ===
- Sir Harold Hillier Gardens, Ampfield, Hampshire, UK. Acc. no. 1991.0891 (listed simply as 'Resista'), single tree planted in Crookhill Field (CK 130), 6.6 m high, 19.0 cm d.b.h. in 2005.

== Nurseries ==
- André Briant Jeunes Plants , Saint-Barthélemy-d'Anjou, France
- Pepinieres Minier , les Fontaines de l'Aunay, France
