= Ulmus 'Variegata Nova' =

Elm cultivar

- Genus: Ulmus
- Cultivar: 'Variegata Nova'
- Origin: England

The elm cultivar Ulmus 'Variegata Nova' was first listed by Nicholson in Kew Hand-List Trees and Shrubs, 2: 137, 1896, as Ulmus campestris var. variegata nova, but without description. The tree was considered "possibly U. carpinifolia" (:minor) by Green.

== Description ==
Henry stated that the tree bears "leaves often much reduced in size, and entirely whitish. Occasionally, branches are produced bearing leaves of normal size with variegation confined to the margin, and one or two branches with green leaves".

== Cultivation ==
No specimens are known to survive.
