= Ulmus americana 'L'Assomption' =

American elm cultivar

- Species: Ulmus americana
- Cultivar: 'L'Assomption'
- Origin: L'Assomption Experimental Station, Quebec, Canada

The American elm cultivar Ulmus americana 'L'Assomption' was selected from seedlings grown from X-irradiated seed at the eponymous experimental station in Quebec before 1965.

== Description ==
'L'Assomption' is a very slow-growing tree.

== Pests and diseases ==
The tree is highly resistant to Dutch elm disease. No other specific information is available, but the species as a whole is highly susceptible to elm yellows; it is also moderately preferred for feeding and reproduction by the adult elm leaf beetle Xanthogaleruca luteola, and highly preferred for feeding by the Japanese beetle Popillia japonica in the United States. U. americana is also the most susceptible of all the elms to verticillium wilt.

== Cultivation ==
The tree is not known to be in cultivation beyond Canada.

== Accessions ==
=== North America ===
- Morden Arboretum, Morden, Canada. Two trees received 1970 from the Forest Research Laboratory in Sillary, Quebec. Acc. no. 65-0328
