= Ulmus 'Planifolia' =

Elm cultivar

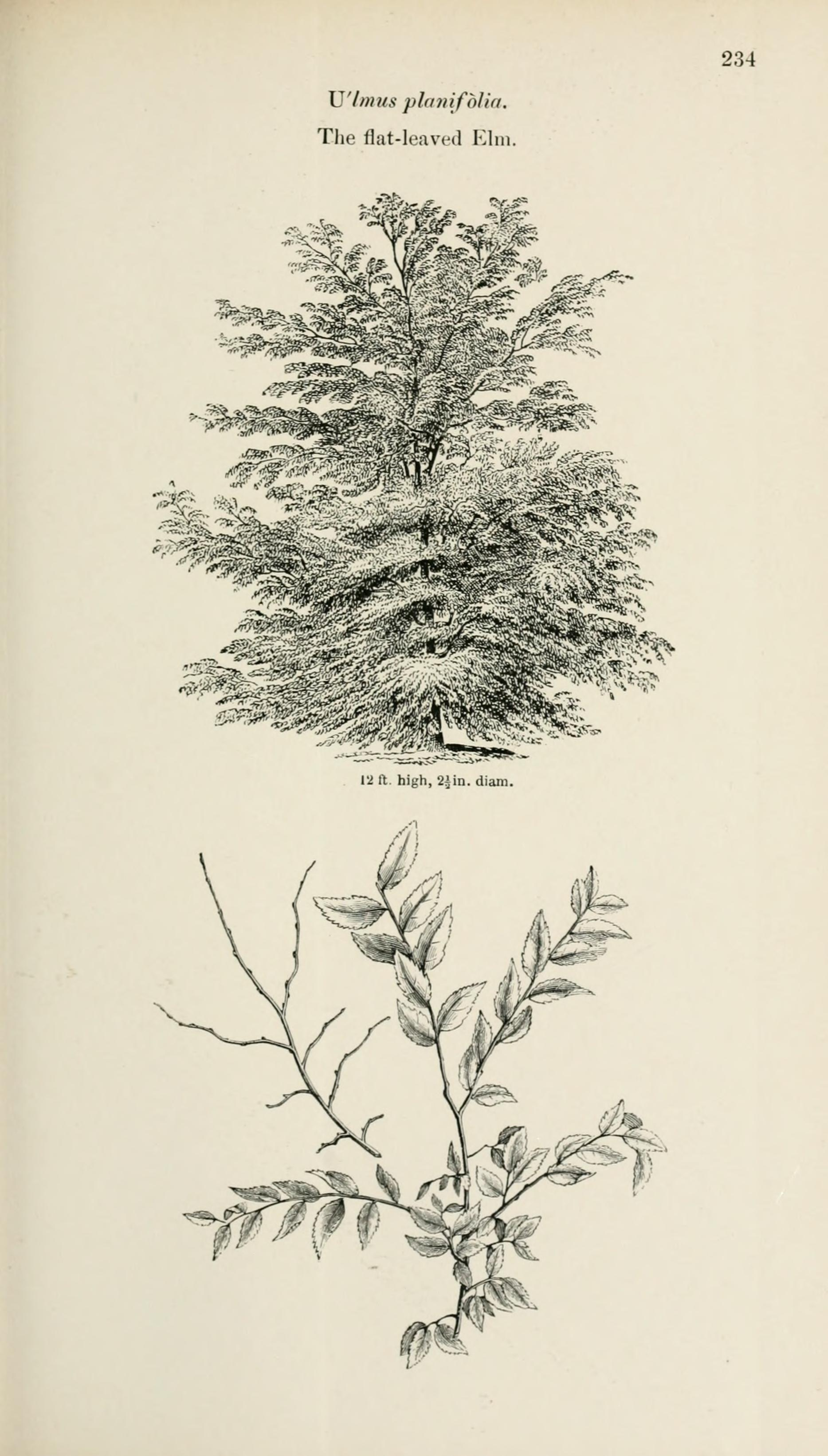
- Ulmus planifolia
- Genus: Ulmus
- Cultivar: 'Planifolia'
- Origin: England

The possible Field Elm cultivar U. minor 'Planifolia' was listed by Loudon in Arboretum et Fruticetum Britannicum (1838) as Ulmus campestris (:minor) var. planifolia, the flat-leaved elm. Green opined that the species was uncertain.

== Description ==
Loudon described the tree as "a handsome small tree, closely resembling U. campestris var. parvifolia" (i.e. the Chinese elm Ulmus parvifolia Jacq.). An illustration appeared in volume 7 of Arboretum et Fruticetum Britannicum (1854).

== Cultivation ==
'Planifolia' and 'Cucullata' were the only two of some sixty elms listed by Joseph Paxton in his Botanical Dictionary (1868) without cultivation locations, suggesting it was an uncommon elm. No specimens are known to survive.
