= Ulmus glabra 'Pendula Macrophylla' =

Elm cultivar

- Species: Ulmus glabra
- Cultivar: 'Pendula Macrophylla'
- Origin: Europe

The Wych Elm cultivar Ulmus glabra 'Pendula Macrophylla', was first mentioned by Maxwell ex Journal of the Royal Horticultural Society 18: 91, 1895, as U. montana (: glabra) var. pendula macrophylla, but without description.

== Description ==
Not available.

== Pests and diseases ==
The clone is very susceptible to Dutch elm disease.

== Cultivation ==
Extremely rare in Europe; not known in North America.

== Accessions ==
- Royal Botanic Gardens, Kew, UK. Cloned from tree growing at Strömparterren sv:Strömparterren, Stockholm. Acc. no. not known.

== Nurseries ==
- Centrum voor Botanische Verrijking vzw, Kampenhout, Belgium.
