= Ulmus 'Rotundifolia' =

Elm cultivar

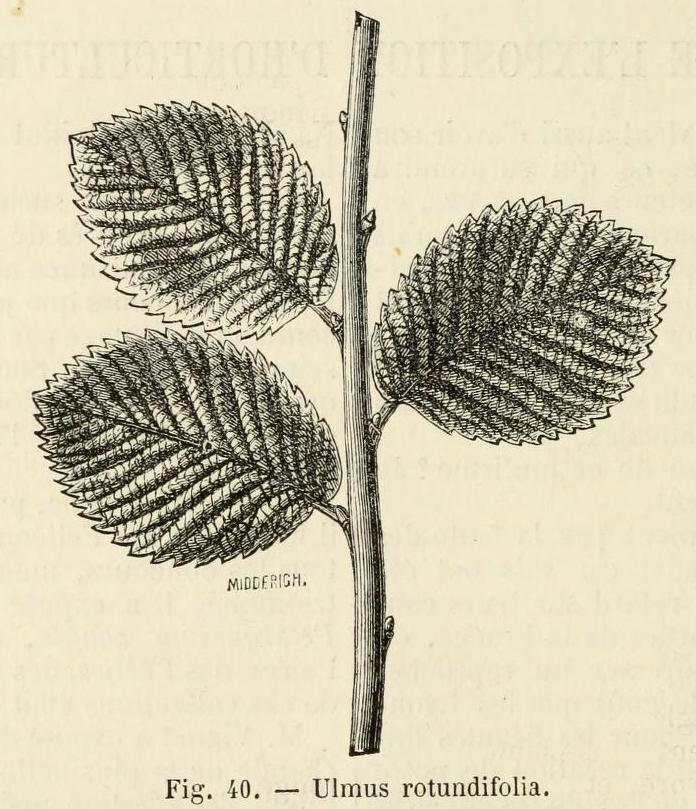
- Leaves of 'Rotundifolia'
- Genus: Ulmus
- Cultivar: 'Rotundifolia'
- Origin: France

The elm cultivar Ulmus 'Rotundifolia' was raised from seed at the Jardin des plantes, Paris, and first described by Carrière in Revue Horticole, 1868, as Ulmus rotundifolia. It was later listed by Mottet in Nicholson & Mottet, Dictionnaire pratique d'horticulture et de jardinage (1898), as Ulmus campestris var.rotundifolia Hort.. It was considered "possibly Ulmus carpinifolia" (: minor) by Green.

== Description ==
The tree was described as having distinctive rounded, oval or suborbicular leaves, almost symmetrical at base, up to 12 cm long by 8 to 10 cm wide, and appearing furrowed or "bubbled" on the upper surface.

== Cultivation ==
No specimens are known to survive.
