= Ulmus glabra 'Cebennensis' =

Elm cultivar

- Species: Ulmus glabra
- Cultivar: 'Cebennensis'
- Origin: France

Ulmus glabra 'Cebennensis', also known as the Cevennes Elm, is a cultivar of the Wych Elm. The first known publication of the cultivar epithet was in the 1831-1832 catalogue from the Audibert brothers plant nursery at Tonelle, near Tarascon in France. The cultivar was given the name Ulmus campestris var. cebennensis.

== Description ==
A description was not provided until 1838 when horticultural writer J.C. Loudon gave the following account: "Its habit is spreading like that of (the species), but it appears of much less vigorous growth", a sentiment echoed half a century later in 'The Illustrated Dictionary of Gardening'. Hanham added that the tree had "a rather drooping habit", and was "very twiggy". He considered it "very ornamental".

== Pests and diseases ==
See under Ulmus glabra.

== Cultivation ==
No specimens are known to survive. One, described as "scarce" in 1857 and "very scarce" in 1902, grew in the Royal Victoria Park, Bath, in the 19th and early 20th century. Described as "small" in 1857, it was still "a small tree" in 1902. 'Cebennensis' is not mentioned in either Elwes and Henry's or Bean's classic works on trees cultivated in Britain.

=== 'Cebennensis'-type elms ===
Wych elms of a similar type sometimes occur among avenue and park plantings in Edinburgh. One such, a small, spreading, non-vigorous wych that does not produce long shoots and that has grown little in recent decades, stands (2018) in East Fettes Avenue.

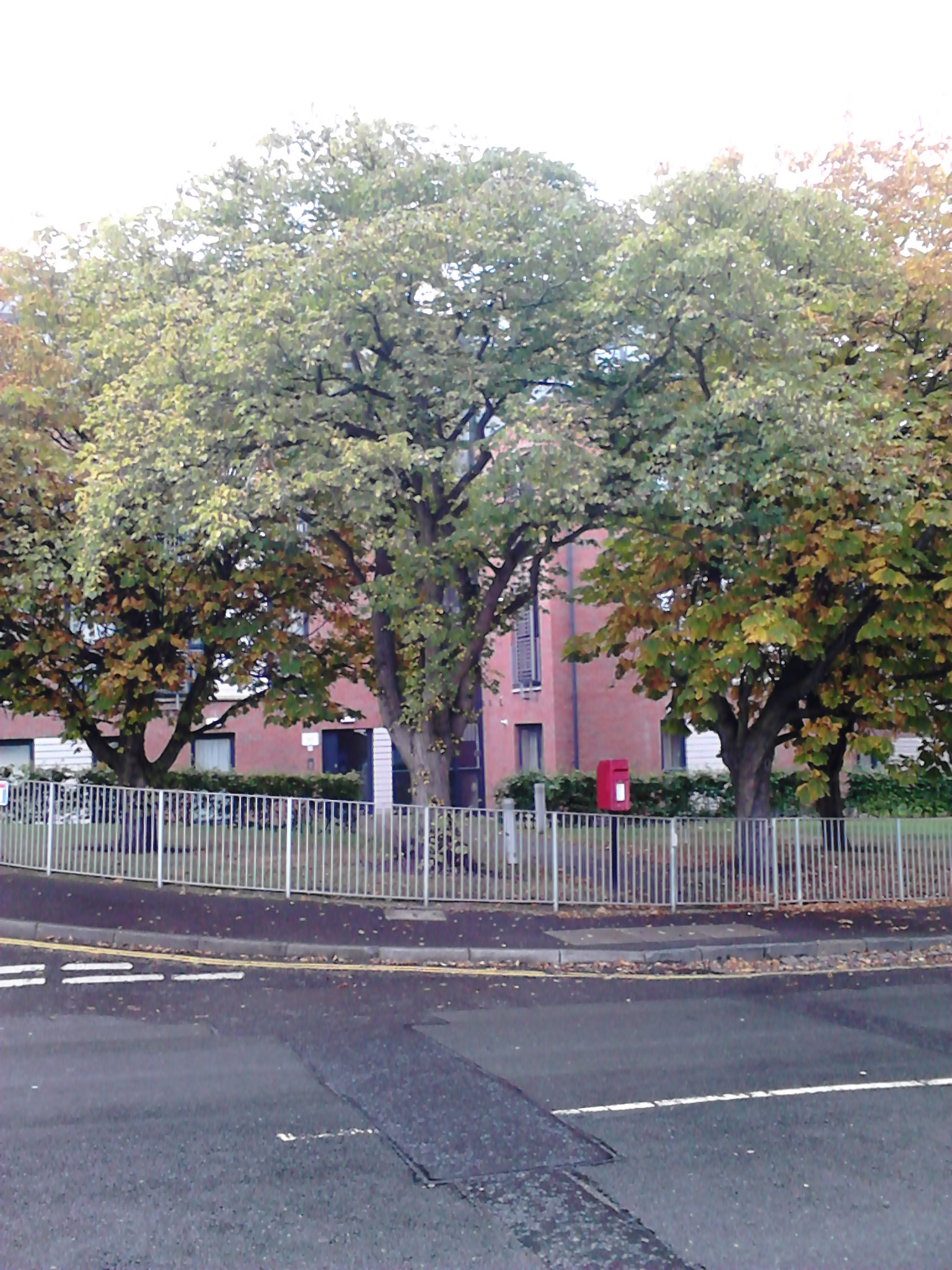
Non-vigorous wych, East Fettes Avenue, Edinburgh

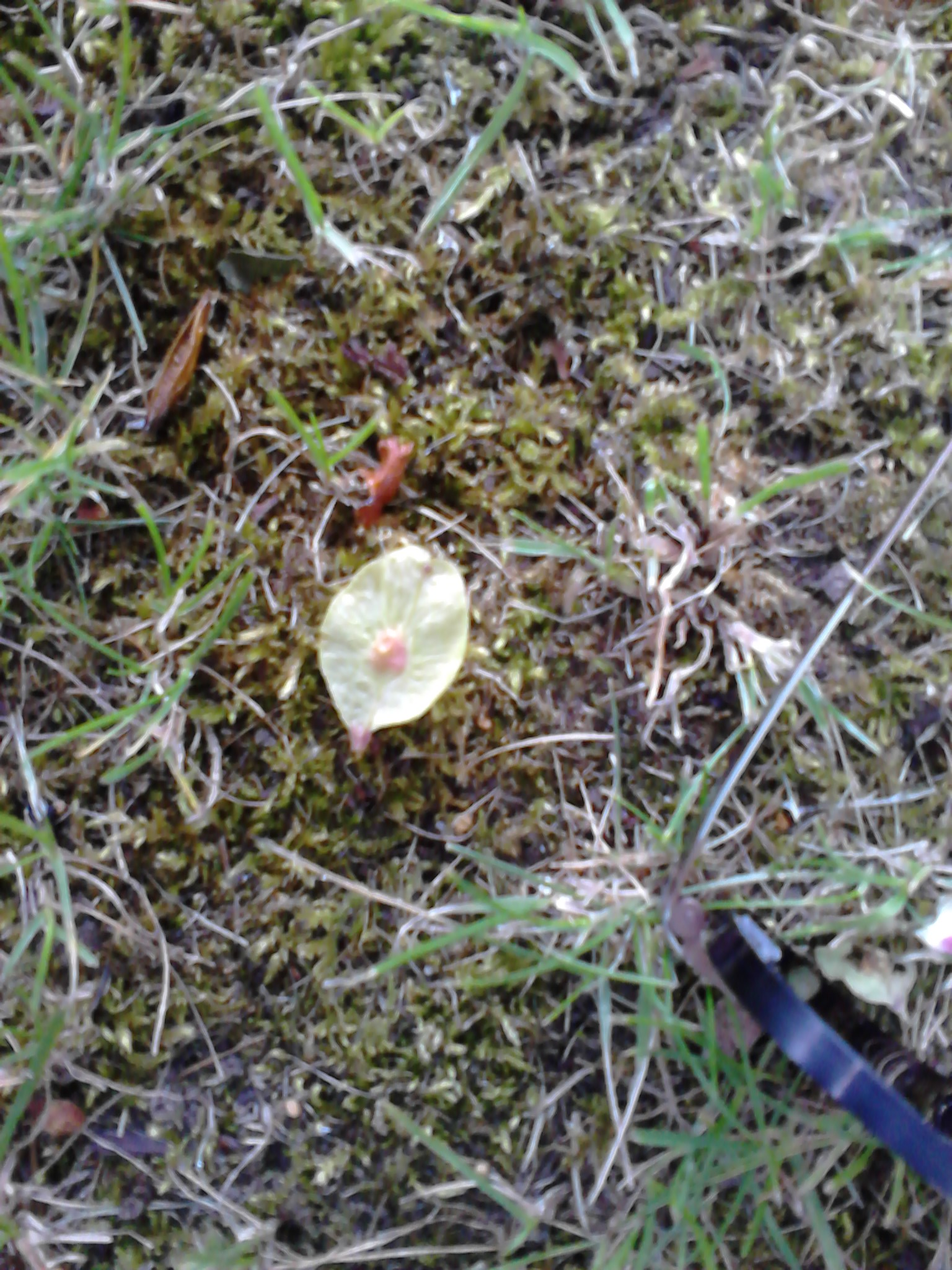
Samara of same

== Synonymy ==
- U. cevennensis: Inman (1902)
