= Ulmus 'Folia Variegata Pendula' =

Elm cultivar

- Genus: Ulmus
- Cultivar: 'Folia Variegata Pendula'
- Origin: Europe

The elm cultivar Ulmus 'Folia Variegata Pendula' was described by C. de Vos in 1867, as Ulmus suberosa folia variegata pendula. Green considered it possibly one of a number of Ulmus × hollandica cultivars, arising from the crossing of Wych Elm Ulmus glabra with field elm Ulmus minor.

== Description ==
Cornelis de Vos described the cultivar as a weak-growing tree, of unsatisfactory duration, but otherwise beautiful.

== Cultivation ==
No specimens are known to survive.
