= Ulmus glabra 'Flava' =

Elm cultivar

- Species: Ulmus glabra
- Cultivar: 'Flava'
- Origin: Germany

The Wych Elm cultivar Ulmus glabra 'Flava' was listed in the Dieck (Zöschen, Germany) catalogue of 1887 as U. scabra (: glabra) f. flava, but without description. The tree should not be confused with Ulmus flava Michx. a probable misspelling of Ulmus fulva, a synonym of U. rubra, the Slippery or Red Elm from North America.

== Description ==
Not available.

== Cultivation ==
No specimens are known to survive.
