= Ulmus americana 'Folia Aurea Variegata' =

Elm cultivar

- Species: Ulmus americana
- Cultivar: 'Folia Aurea Variegata'
- Origin: Germany

The American elm cultivar Ulmus americana 'Folia Aurea Variegata' was first described by Jäger in Die ziergehölze der Gärten und parkanlagen (1865). An Ulmus americana foliis variegatis Hort. had been listed by Loudon in 1838.

== Description ==
The tree was distinguished by leaves variegated with yellow.

== Cultivation ==
Loudon reported specimens of his 'Foliis variegatis' in the Horticultural Society Garden. No specimens are known to survive. A 2018 Cornell study of the surviving elms of the National Mall, Washington D.C., listed some 28 specimens of a "distinctive striped cultivar, possibly U. americana ", but this referred to vertical fissuring in young bark, not to variegated leaves.

== Synonymy ==
- U. americana var. foliis variegatis Hort.: Loudon, Arboretum et Fruticetum Britannicum, 4: 2587, 1838.
