= Ulmus 'Jalaica' =

Elm cultivar

- Genus: Ulmus
- Cultivar: 'Jalaica'
- Origin: Estonia

The possible elm cultivar Ulmus 'Jalaica' hails from the Baltic states. Living specimens are grown in the arboretum at the National Botanic Garden of Latvia, Salaspils, introduced in 1998 from the Tallinn Botanic Garden and the plantarium OPU Tallinn, Estonia. It was assumed the word 'Jalaica' was the name given the cultivar, but it has since emerged that the word simply means 'Elm' in Estonian, and the trees donated may not in fact be cultivars, although of rather unusual appearance.

== Accessions ==
=== Europe ===
- National Botanic Garden of Latvia, Salaspils, Latvia.
