= Ulmus americana 'Morden' =

Elm cultivar

- Species: Ulmus americana
- Cultivar: 'Morden'
- Origin: Dominion Experimental Farm, Morden, Manitoba, Canada

The American elm cultivar Ulmus americana 'Morden' was cloned from a selection made by the Dominion Experimental Farm, Morden, Manitoba, in 1939 on account of its ability to withstand severe ice storms without breakage.

== Description ==
Fast-growing and ultimately large, 'Morden' has been described as "rather coarse".

== Pests and diseases ==
The tree is not known to have a resistance to Dutch elm disease (see Cultivation). No other specific information available, but the species generally is moderately preferred for feeding and reproduction by the adult elm leaf beetle Xanthogaleruca luteola, and highly preferred for feeding by the Japanese beetle Popillia japonica in the United States. U. americana is the most susceptible of all the elms to verticillium wilt.

== Cultivation ==
The tree was first marketed by the Patmore Nurseries, Brandon, Manitoba, circa 1948. A specimen planted in the Longenecker Horticultural Gardens at the University of Wisconsin–Madison Arboretum in 1956 had died by 1974 "probably from Dutch elm disease"; no others are known to remain in cultivation.
