= Ulmus americana 'Creole Queen' =

Elm cultivar

- Species: Ulmus americana
- Cultivar: 'Creole Queen'
- Origin: Louisiana, US

The American elm cultivar Ulmus americana 'Creole Queen' was cloned from a tree growing outside New Orleans and was released in 2008.

== Description ==
'Creole Queen' is distinguished by its narrow habit, typically growing to a height of 15 m, with a crown width of 4.5 m. The tree is reputedly very heat tolerant.

== Pests and diseases ==
No specific information available, but the species as a whole is highly susceptible to Dutch elm disease and elm yellows; it is also moderately preferred for feeding and reproduction by the adult elm leaf beetle Xanthogaleruca luteola, and highly preferred for feeding by the Japanese beetle Popillia japonica in the United States. U. americana is also the most susceptible of all the elms to verticillium wilt.
