= Ulmus glabra 'Insularis' =

Elm cultivar

- 'Insularis' on Ven, Sweden.
- Species: Ulmus glabra
- Cultivar: 'Insularis'
- Origin: Sweden

The cultivar Ulmus glabra 'Insularis' [:'island'], the Ven island elm, a fastigiate form of Wych Elm from Sweden, was identified and described by Nilsson in Lustgården 30: 127. 1949, as U. glabra Huds. f. insularis. Nilsson considered it "closely related to subspecies montana (Stokes) Lindqvist". The cultivar arose from a tree on Ven island in Öresund sound, planted c.1900 between Haken and Husvik, possibly from self-sown local seedlings, and approaching 2 m in girth by the late 1940s.

== Description ==
The tree was described by Nilsson as columnar, having a rounded elongate-ovoid crown, and dense sub-erect branches. The relatively elongated leaves are widest above the middle, quite tapered towards a long tip, and tapering to an unsymmetrical base. The margin is triple-toothed. New shoots are downy. Flowers and fruits as in the type. Nilsson (1949) included photographs of the original tree in winter and summer, and a leaves photo.

== Pests and diseases ==
See under Ulmus glabra.

== Cultivation ==
The horticultural potential of the tree was early recognized and propagation was already under way in Sweden when Nilsson published his 1949 article. The tree was sometimes planted in botanical collections. Krüssmann (1984) contains a photograph of a young specimen in the Wageningen Arboretum in the Netherlands.

=== 'Insularis'-like wych elms ===
A narrow 'Insularis'-like wych elm that stands before Wright's Houses, Bruntsfield Links, Edinburgh (2018), may pre-date the cultivation of the Swedish clone. Despite being an unpollarded open-grown tree, its branches are mostly steeply ascending. Leaves and samarae are typical of the species.

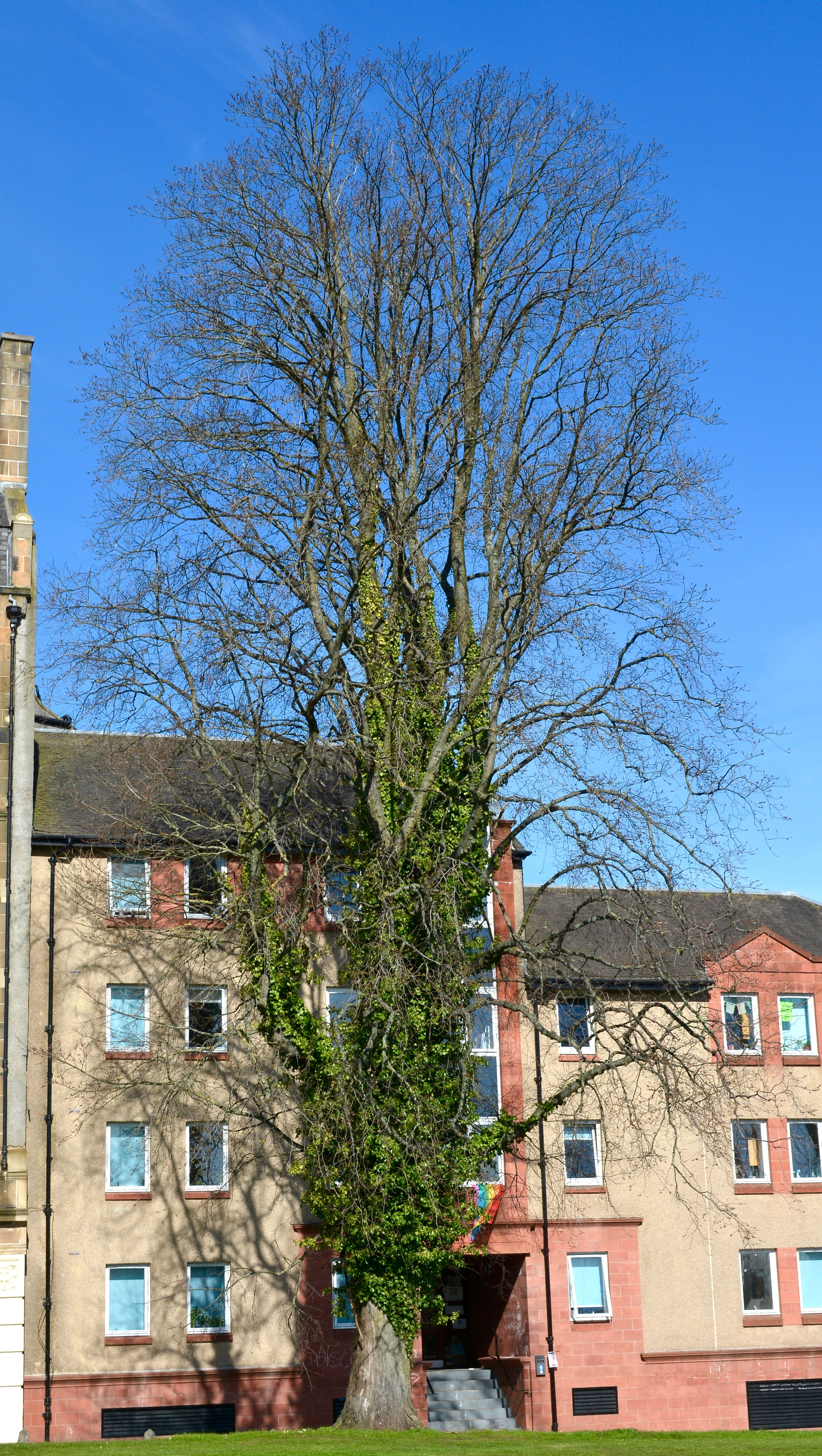
Bruntsfield Links wych, Edinburgh (April, 2016)

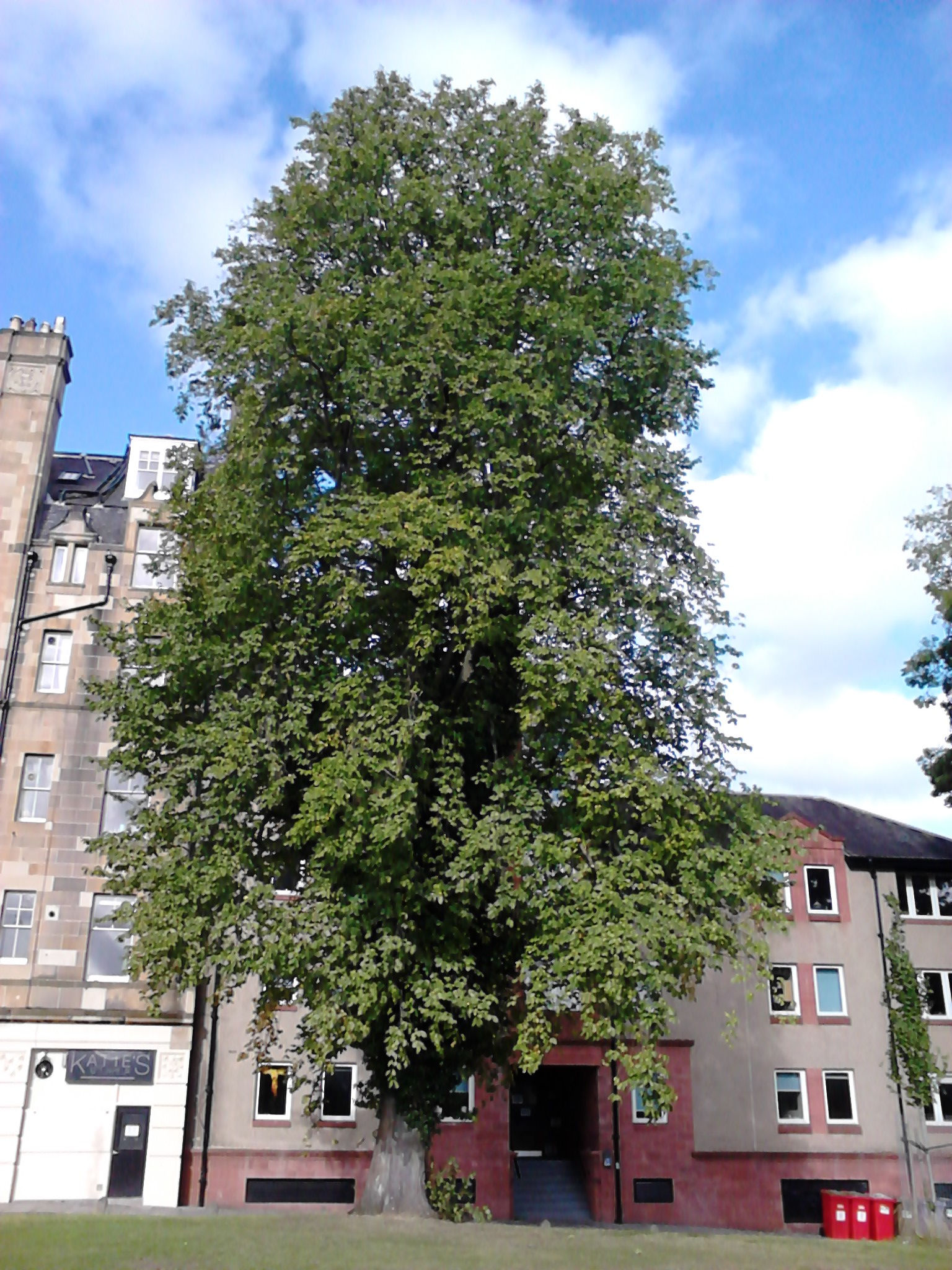
Same (October 2016)

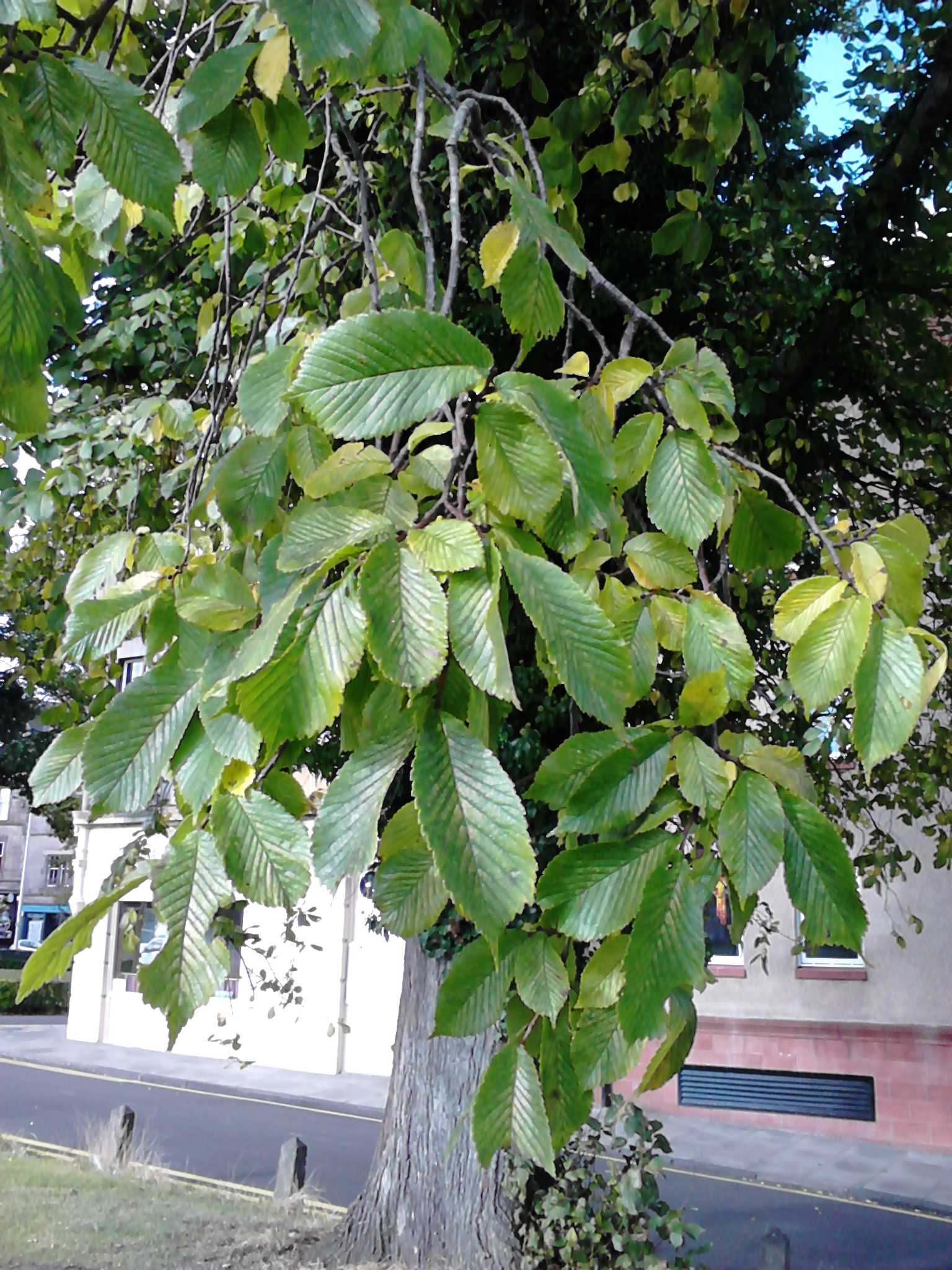
Leaves of same
