= Ulmus americana 'Flick's Spreader' =

Elm cultivar

- Species: Ulmus americana
- Cultivar: 'Flick's Spreader'
- Origin: US

The American elm cultivar Ulmus americana 'Flick's Spreader' was cloned from a tree discovered by John T. Flick on a farm near Hammon, Oklahoma. Cuttings were given to the Sunshine Nursery, Clinton, Oklahoma, in 1997, which later marketed the tree as 'Flick's Spreader'.

== Description ==
None available.

== Pests and diseases ==
No specific information available, but the species as a whole is highly susceptible to Dutch elm disease and elm yellows; it is also moderately preferred for feeding and reproduction by the adult elm leaf beetle Xanthogaleruca luteola, and highly preferred for feeding by the Japanese beetle Popillia japonica in the United States. U. americana is also the most susceptible of all the elms to verticillium wilt.

== Cultivation ==
Not known.
