= Ulmus 'Folia Rubra' =

Elm cultivar

- Genus: Ulmus
- Cultivar: 'Folia Rubra'
- Origin: Belgium

The elm cultivar Ulmus 'Folia Rubra' was listed as Ulmus campestris foliis rubris by Louis de Smet in his catalogue of 1877, and Edouard Pynaert van Geert in the same year who obtained the tree from M. Gaujard of Wetteren, Belgium. An U. campestris fol. rubris Hort. was distributed by the Späth nursery, Berlin, in the 1890s and early 1900s.

Considered "probably Ulmus carpinifolia" (: minor) by Green.

== Description ==
'Folia Rubra' was later described as having small leaves with a reddish-green tinge.

== Cultivation ==
No specimens are known to survive. One tree was planted in 1897 as U. campestris fol. rubris at the Dominion Arboretum, Ottawa, Canada. Three specimens were supplied by the Späth nursery to the RBGE in 1902 as U. campestris fol. rubris, and may possibly survive in Edinburgh as it was the practice of the Garden to distribute trees about the city (viz. the Wentworth Elm); the current list of Living Accessions held in the Garden per se does not list the plant. A specimen of U. campestris foliis rubris, obtained from Späth, stood in the Ryston Hall arboretum, Norfolk, in the early 20th century.

== Synonymy ==
- Ulmus campestris foliis rubris.
- Ulmus campestris fol. rubris.
