= Ulmus americana 'Deadfree' =

Elm cultivar

- Species: Ulmus americana
- Cultivar: 'Deadfree'
- Origin: US

The American elm cultivar Ulmus americana 'Deadfree' (originally known simply as '76') was listed by the Urban Forestry Administration (UFA) of the District Department of Transportation in Washington, D.C., as one of its "street trees" in 2008. However, the UFA currently has no documentation to support it, and thus the entry may be spurious.

The tree is almost certainly synonymous with 'DED-FREE', a tree at the Arnold Arboretum, Harvard University, obtained from the Princeton Nursery, Princeton, New Jersey in 1973, cloned from the only survivor (late 1940s) among a grove of elms following natural devastation by Dutch elm disease, and subsequently proved resistant by artificial inoculations. However, the tree was neither offered for public sale nor distribution.

The name was never validly published and the originator has suggested that it not be validated.
