= Ulmus americana 'College' =

Elm cultivar

- Species: Ulmus americana
- Cultivar: 'College'
- Origin: Wedge Nursery, Albert Lea, Minnesota, US

The putative American elm cultivar Ulmus americana 'College' was raised at the Wedge Nursery (ceased trading 2008), Albert Lea, Minnesota, and was first listed in its catalogue of 1961. However, the tree has never been formally recognized as a valid cultivar.

== Description ==
Not available.

== Cultivation ==
'College' is not known to remain in cultivation.

== Synonymy ==
- 'Elm College': Wedge Nursery, Minnesota, name in synonymy.
