= Ulmus 'Sericea' =

Elm cultivar

- Genus: Ulmus
- Cultivar: 'Sericea'
- Origin: France?

The elm cultivar Ulmus 'Sericea' was first listed by Lavallée in Arboretum Segrezianum 236, 1877, as Ulmus campestris var. sericea, but without description. Deemed "possibly U. carpinifolia" (:minor) by Green

== Description ==
Not available. The name suggests to downy or pilose foliage.

== Cultivation ==
No specimens are known to survive.
