= Ulmus americana 'Exhibition' =

Elm cultivar

- Species: Ulmus americana
- Cultivar: 'Exhibition'
- Origin: Patmore Nurseries, Brandon, Manitoba, Canada

The American elm cultivar Ulmus americana 'Exhibition' is a selection made by the Patmore Nurseries from seeds of a tree at Brandon, Manitoba. Released in 1952, 'Exhibition' was propagated by grafting.

== Description ==
The tree has an upright habit, with a dense, vase-shaped canopy formed from branches bearing numerous small twigs.

== Pests and diseases ==
No specific information available, but the species as a whole is highly susceptible to Dutch elm disease and elm yellows; it is also moderately preferred for feeding and reproduction by the adult elm leaf beetle Xanthogaleruca luteola, and highly preferred for feeding by the Japanese beetle Popillia japonica in the United States. U. americana is also the most susceptible of all the elms to verticillium wilt.

== Cultivation ==
The tree's status in North America is not known. 'Exhibition' is no longer in commerce.

== Synonymy ==
- 'Exhibition Boulevard': Anon.
