= Ulmus americana 'Jackson' =

Elm cultivar

- Species: Ulmus americana
- Cultivar: 'Jackson'
- Origin: Wichita, Kansas, US

The American elm cultivar Ulmus americana 'Jackson' was cloned c.1990 from an elm selected at Wichita, Kansas, which had reputedly shewn no signs of Dutch elm disease damage at over 50 years of age.

== Description ==
The elm is "oak-like" in form, with wide-spreading branches, growing to about 60 ft tall and wide.

== Pests and diseases ==
The resistance of 'Jackson' to Dutch elm disease had not as of 1995 been confirmed by artificial inoculation. The species as a whole is highly susceptible to Dutch elm disease and elm yellows; it is also moderately preferred for feeding and reproduction by the adult elm leaf beetle Xanthogaleruca luteola, and highly preferred for feeding by the Japanese beetle Popillia japonica in the United States. U. americana is also the most susceptible of all the elms to verticillium wilt.

== Cultivation ==
As a nursery cultivar, 'Jackson' was last listed in the Fall 1994 - Spring 1995 catalogue of the now-defunct Arborvillage Farm Nurseries, Holt, Missouri. A specimen, planted in 1999, stands (2022) in Dawes Arboretum, Newark, Ohio, where it is said to be fast-growing. A specimen obtained from Arborvillage Farm Nurseries in 2000 stood in the Botanic Garden of Mount Holyoke College, South Hadley, Massachusetts, till destroyed in a storm in 2011. The tree is not known to have been introduced to Europe or Australasia.

== Accessions ==
=== North America ===
- Dawes Arboretum , Newark, Ohio, US. 1 tree (2022), accession no.: D1999-0081.001
