= Ulmus 'Folia Aurea' =

Elm cultivar

- Genus: Ulmus
- Cultivar: 'Folia Aurea'
- Origin: UK

Ulmus 'Folia Aurea' is an elm cultivar first identified (as U. campestris var. foliis aureis) by Loudon in Arboretum et Fruticetum Britannicum, 3: 1378, 1838.

== Description ==
Loudon described the tree as having leaves variegated with yellow.

== Cultivation ==
No specimens are known to survive.
