= Ulmus 'Globosa' =

Elm cultivar

- Genus: Ulmus
- Cultivar: 'Globosa'
- Origin: Germany

The elm cultivar Ulmus 'Globosa' was first described (as Ulmus campestris globosa Behnsch) in the Späth nursery catalogue of 1892–93. Considered "probably Ulmus carpinifolia (: minor)" by Green

== Description ==
Späth described the tree as having an uninterrupted, very dense, strongly branched, globose crown with firm, coriaceous shining leaves, but very different from those of 'Umbraculifera'. The leaves were said to be like those of 'Berardii'.

== Cultivation ==
No specimens are known to survive. At the bottom of a 'Globosa' herbarium specimen from Germany a small sketch of a tree labelled U. procera cv. globosa, which stood in the Hortus Nymphenburg, Munich, in the mid-20th century, shows a rounded lollipop form on a long bare trunk. Its leaves, however, do not resemble those of 'Berardii'.

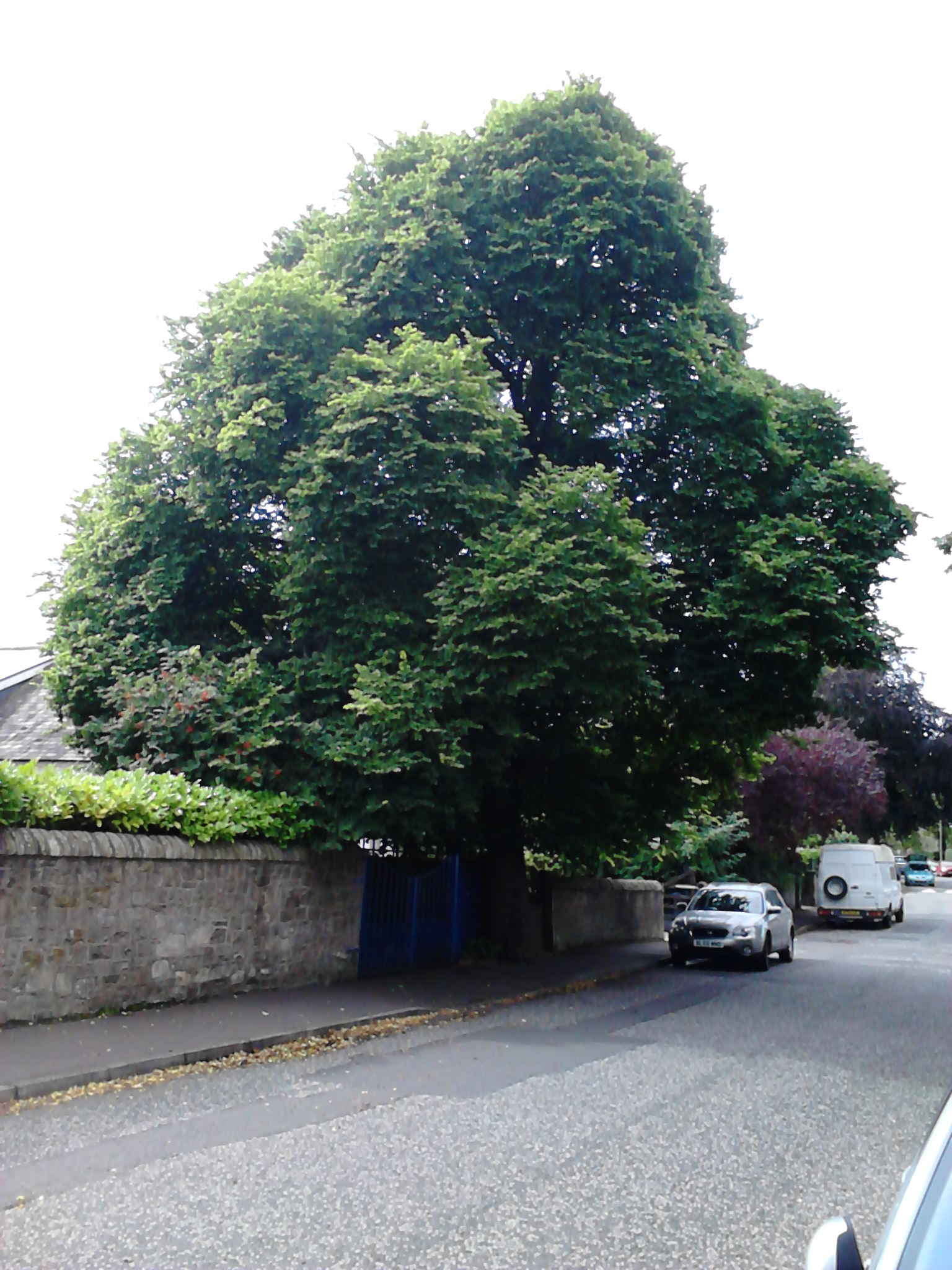
A dense quasi-globose field elm cultivar in Boswall Rd, Edinburgh, with leaves resembling those of the Hortus Nymphenburg specimen, Munich (see External links)

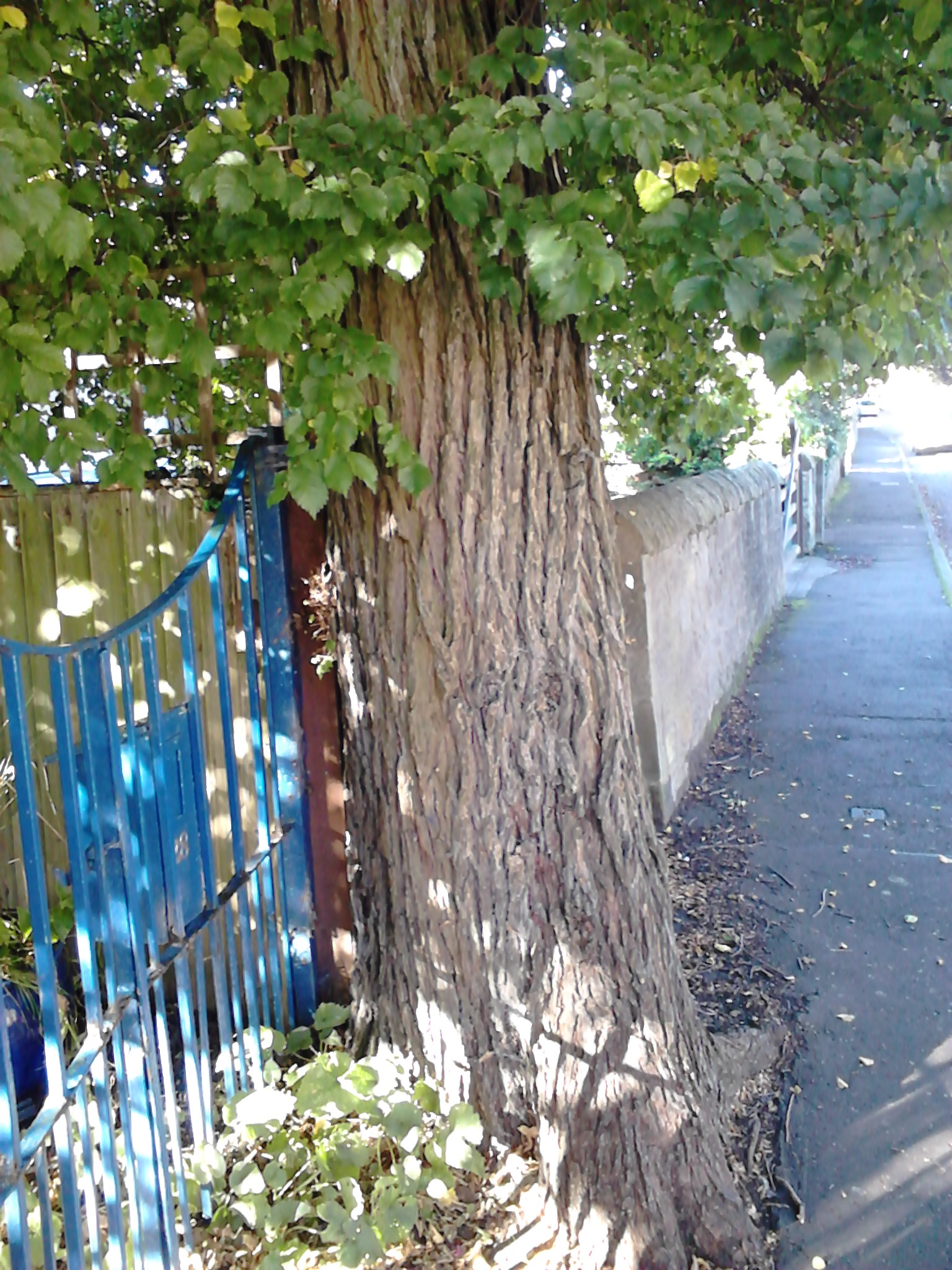
Bark and leaves of dense quasi-globose field elm cultivar in Boswall Rd, Edinburgh

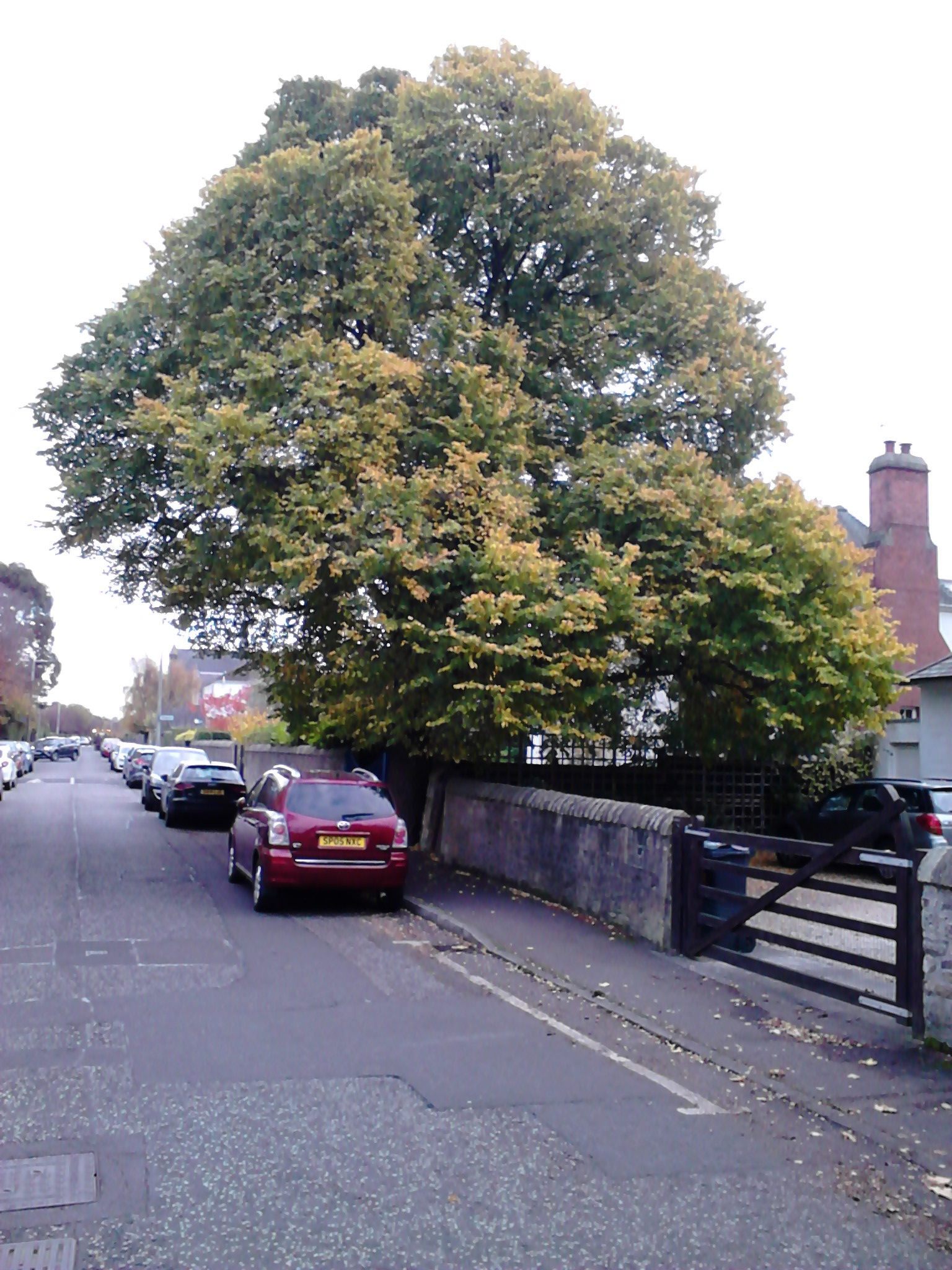
Boswall Rd field elm cultivar, early autumn

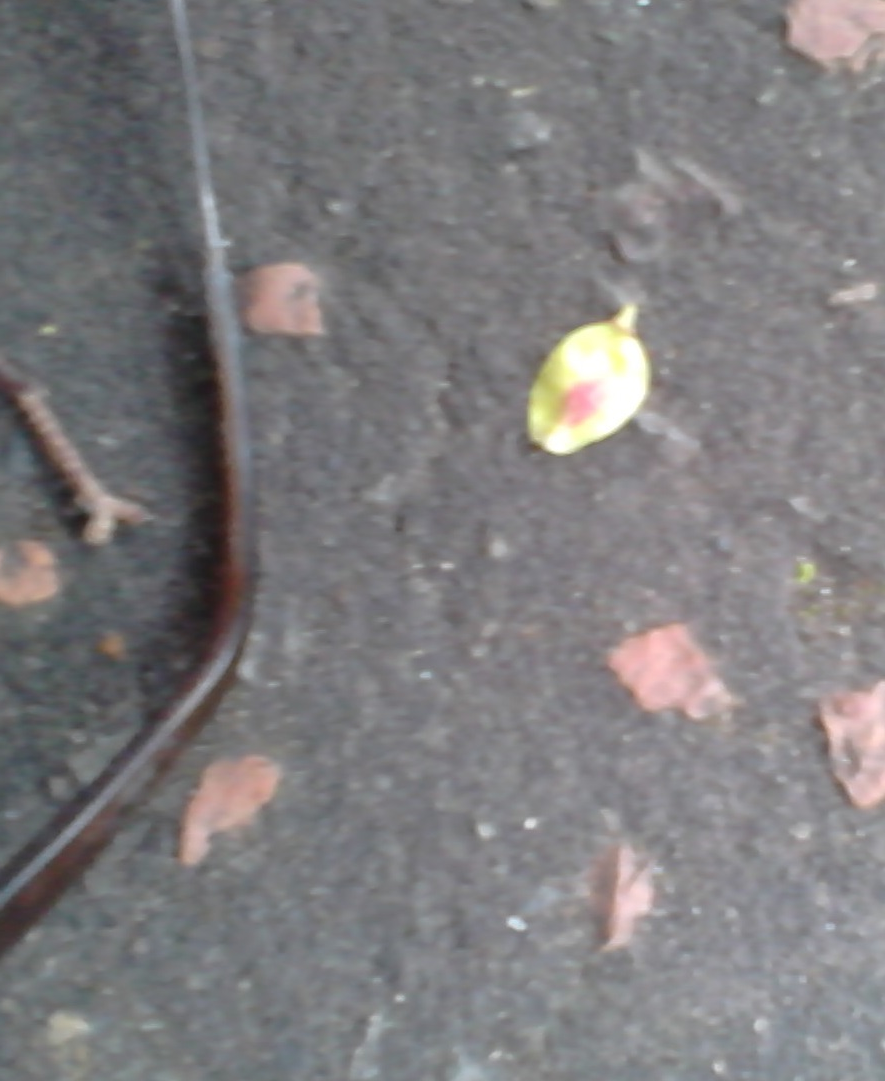
Fruit of Boswall Rd field elm cultivar

== Synonymy ==
- Ulmus campestris globosa Behnsch
