= Ulmus 'Acutifolia' =

Elm cultivar

- Genus: Ulmus
- Cultivar: 'Acutifolia'
- Origin: UK

The elm cultivar Ulmus 'Acutifolia' was first described (as U. campestris acutifolia) by Masters in Hortus Duroverni 66. 1831, and later by Mottet in Nicholson & Mottet, Dictionnaire pratique d'horticulture et de jardinage 5: 383, 1898.

== Description ==
The tree has been described as having narrower leaves and branches more pendulous when mature.

== Cultivation ==
No specimens are known to survive.

== Synonymy ==
- Ulmus campestris acutifolia: Masters, Hortus Duroverni 66. 1831, and Mottet in Nicholson & Mottet, Dictionnaire pratique d'horticulture et de jardinage 5: 383, 1898.
