= Ulmus glabra 'Holgeri' =

Elm cultivar

- Species: Ulmus glabra
- Cultivar: 'Holgeri'
- Origin: Sweden

The putative Wych Elm cultivar Ulmus glabra 'Holgeri' originated in Sweden, where it was described by Holger Jensen of Ramlösa Plantskola, Helsingborg, in 1921. It was distributed by the Späth nursery of Berlin in the 1920s and '30s as Ulmus montana Holgeri. Späth used U. montana both for wych and for U. × hollandica hybrids like 'Dampieri', so the name does not necessarily imply a wych cultivar. In The Netherlands the tree was classified as an Ulmus × hollandica hybrid, a 1932 herbarium specimen from a tree in The Hague supplied by Späth being labelled Ulmus hollandica var. holgeri (Jensen).

== Description ==
'Holgeri' was described as straight and sturdy, of very strong growth, with beautiful dark green leaves. The herbarium specimen from The Hague appears to show hybrid leaves, without the abrupt tapering and "shoulder" of wych elm.

== Pests and diseases ==
Cultivars of both wych and U. × hollandica are susceptible to Dutch elm disease.

== Cultivation ==
No specimens are known to survive.
