= Ulmus americana 'Skinner Upright' =

Elm cultivar

- Species: Ulmus americana
- Cultivar: 'Skinner Upright'
- Origin: Skinner's Nursery, Roblin, Manitoba, Canada

The American elm cultivar Ulmus americana 'Skinner Upright' was raised by Skinner's Nursery, Roblin, Manitoba, in 1954.

== Description ==
Not available.

== Cultivation ==
Specimens were once grown at the arboretum of the Morden Research Station, Manitoba, but, without any known resistance to Dutch elm disease, it is unlikely the tree remains in cultivation in North America or beyond.

== Synonymy ==
- 'Skinner's Upright'. Anon.
