= Ulmus 'Alksuth' =

Elm cultivar

- Genus: Ulmus
- Cultivar: 'Alksuth'
- Origin: Austria

The elm cultivar Ulmus 'Alksuth' was first mentioned by Dieck (Zöschen, Germany) in Haupt-catalog der Obst- und gehölzbaumschulen des ritterguts Zöschen bei Merseburg, p. 81 (1885) as Ulmus scabra (: glabra) forma von Alksuth Hort.. Describing it as "an outstanding new plant", Dieck noted that 'Alksuth' is the corrupted name of an Austrian park, its provenance.

== Description ==
"The form itself is very remarkable," wrote Dieck, "as the acute-rounded leaves, otherwise shaped like those of adiantifolia (tricuspis) [: three-cusped fern-leaved elm], have a number of almost thread-like protruding leaf-teeth at the tip edge". 'Adiantifolia', fern-leaved elm, was a synonym of 'Crispa'. Considered by Green (1964) as "possibly Ulmus carpinifolia" (: minor). No herbarium specimens of 'Alksuth' are known.

== Cultivation ==
No specimens are known to survive. In 2025 Brighton and Hove City Council incorrectly listed a non-'Crispa'-like elm in Stanford Avenue by this name, not matching Dieck's leaf-description of "thread-like" teeth at the leaf tip. (Note: Stanford Avenue leaves, short shoots , Stanford Avenue leaves, long shoot)
