= Ulmus glabra 'Pyrenaica' =

Cultivar of the Wych Elm tree

- Species: Ulmus glabra
- Cultivar: 'Pyrenaica'
- Origin: France

Ulmus glabra 'Pyrenaica' is a local cultivar of the Wych Elm, described as Ulmus pyrenaica, the Pyrenees Elm, by de Lapeyrouse in Supplément à l'Histoire abrégée des plantes des Pyrénées (1818), from trees in the Port [:pass] de la Picade in the Basses-Pyrenees. Chevalier added a further description in 'Les Ormes de France' (1942), and a second provenance in the nearby Bagnères-de-Luchon area. Herbarium specimens are held in the Muséum national d'histoire naturelle in Paris, where U. campestris var. montana latifolia is given as a synonym.

== Description ==
An elm to 12 m tall, with long branches, spreading at first, then pendulous, with smooth bark. The leathery leaves are large (about 20 cm long, 10 to 12 wide), oval, almost equal-sided, tapering and almost wedge-shaped at the base, with an abrupt but long, narrow and pointed apex (3 to 4 cm); upper surface rough, lower almost smooth; deeply double-toothed. Leaf-shoots are very downy. The samara is shallowly notched, with the seed central.

== Pests and diseases ==
See under Ulmus glabra.

== Cultivation ==
Lapeyrouse reported that the elm was much cultivated in its local area for use by wheelwrights. The naturalist Désveaux, who studied the tree and annotated the Paris herbarium specimens of it, reported that propagation plans were afoot, "car c'est un bel arbre d'ornement" [:as it is a fine ornamental tree].
