= Ulmus glabra 'Albo-Variegata' =

Elm cultivar

- Species: Ulmus glabra
- Cultivar: 'Albo-Variegata'
- Origin: England

The Wych Elm cultivar Ulmus glabra 'Albo-Variegata' was first mentioned by Weston (The Universal Botanist and Nurseryman. 1 : 315) in 1770 as U. glabra var. variegata. An U. campestris latifolia albo-variegata Hort. was distributed by the Späth nursery, Berlin, from the 1890s to the 1930s.

== Description ==
Weston described the tree as having leaves striped with white. Späth's cultivar was described in his 1903 and 1930 catalogues as having "large white-marbled leaves".

== Pests and diseases ==
See under Ulmus glabra.

== Cultivation ==
An elm with white-variegated wych-type leaves is sold in Poland. Three specimens of U. campestris latifolia albo-variegata were supplied by Späth to the Royal Botanic Garden Edinburgh in 1902, and may survive in Edinburgh as it was the practice of the Garden to distribute trees about the city (viz. the Wentworth Elm).

== Synonymy ==
- ? Ulmus montana (: glabra) var. variegata: Loudon, Arboretum et Fruticetum Britannicum, 3: 1405, 1838.
- ? Ulmus montana albo-marginata: Cheal's nursery of Crawley
