= Ulmus americana 'Queen City' =

Elm cultivar

- Species: Ulmus americana
- Cultivar: 'Queen City'
- Origin: Sheridan Nurseries, Ontario, Canada

The American elm cultivar Ulmus americana 'Queen City' was a selection made c. 1944 from a tree growing on the Lake Shore Boulevard in Toronto, Ontario, Canada.

== Description ==
The tree was distinguished by its symmetric vase-shape, dense branching, the lateral branches extending horizontally, and smooth bark.

== Cultivation ==
'Queen City' was first marketed by the Sheridan Nurseries, Toronto, Ontario, in 1949; it is not known to remain in cultivation.

== Etymology ==
'Queen City' is a former nickname of Toronto.
