= Ulmus americana 'Incisa' =

Elm cultivar

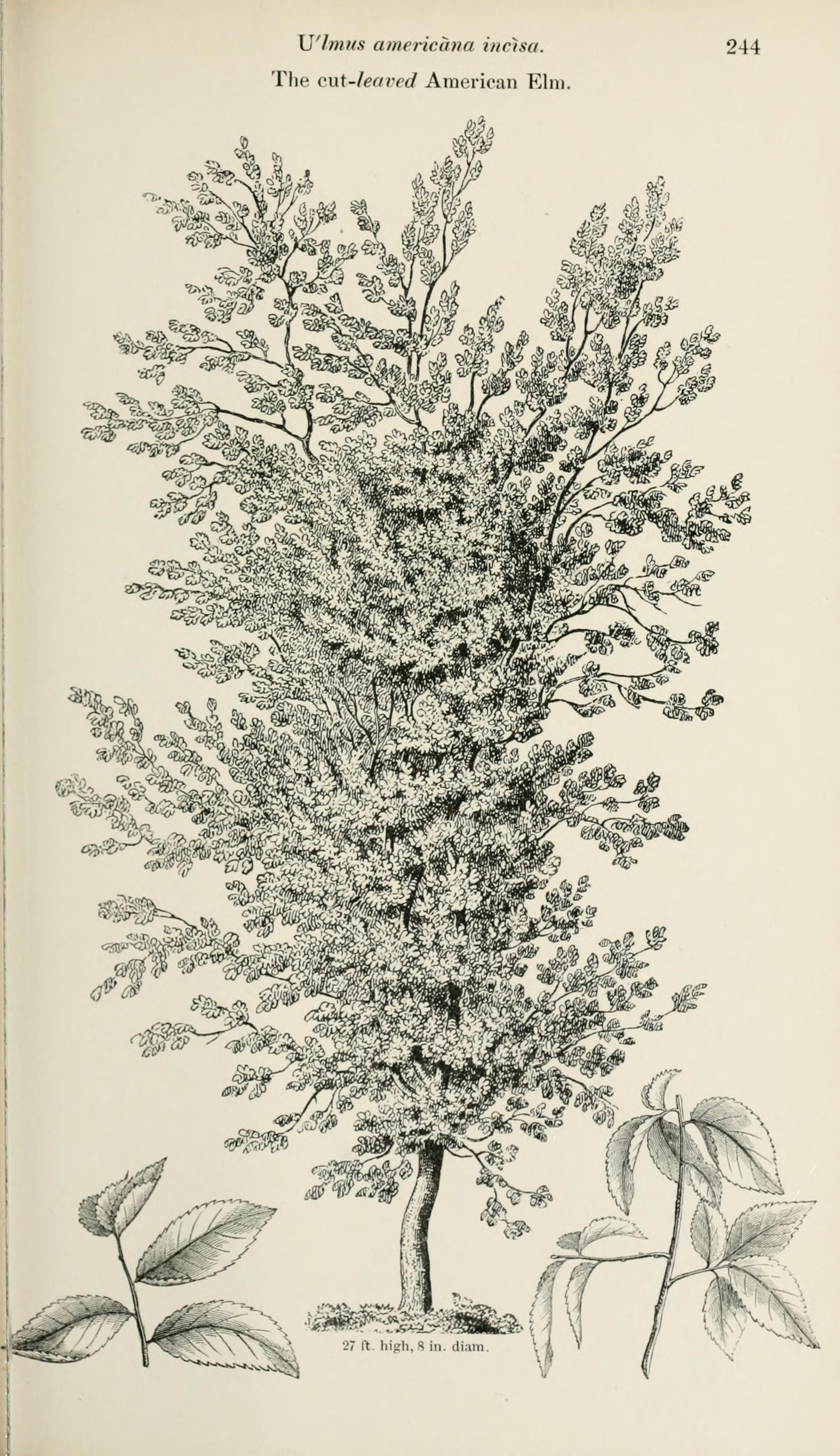
- The cut-leaved American elm (Loudon)
- Species: Ulmus americana
- Cultivar: 'Incisa'
- Origin: England

The American elm cultivar Ulmus americana 'Incisa' was first described by Loudon in 1838 from a specimen in the Horticultural Society's Garden.

== Description ==
The tree had "leaves somewhat more deeply serrated and rather smaller" than the type, Loudon likening them to those of Ulmus effusa.

== Cultivation ==
The specimen in the Horticultural Society's Garden was 27 ft tall in 1834; Loudon considered it striking enough for a plate (Arboretum et fruticetum britannicum; Vol.II). No specimens are known to survive, though forms with deeply serrated leaves sometimes occur in the wild.
