= Ulmus glabra 'Gigantea' =

Elm cultivar

- Species: Ulmus glabra
- Cultivar: 'Gigantea'
- Origin: Europe

The Wych Elm cultivar Ulmus glabra 'Gigantea' was listed as U. montana var. gigantea Hort. by Kirchner (1864). An U. montana gigantea was distributed by the Späth nursery, Berlin, in the 1890s and early 1900s. It did not appear in Späth's 1903 catalogue. A specimen at Kew was judged by Henry to be "not distinct enough to deserve a special name". Both Späth and the Hesse Nursery of Weener, Germany, supplied it in the 1930s.

Green gave a different clone, the Dutch Elm 'Major', as synonym of 'Gigantea'. Christine Buisman listed Ulmus hollandica gigantea (possibly 'Major') as present in The Hague in the 1930s.

== Description ==
The Kew specimen was a small tree with ascending branches. Herbarium leaf-specimens show a large orbicular wych elm leaf with a typically short petiole.

== Pests and diseases ==
A cultivar of the Wych Elm, 'Gigantea' is susceptible to Dutch Elm disease.

== Cultivation ==
One tree was planted in 1897 as U. montana gigantea at the Dominion Arboretum, Ottawa, Canada. Three specimens supplied by Späth to the RBGE in 1902 as U. montana gigantea may survive in Edinburgh, as it was the practice of the Garden to distribute trees about the city (viz. the Wentworth Elm); the current list of Living Accessions held in the Garden per se does not list the plant.

== Accessions ==
None known.
