= Ulmus 'Kansas Hybrid' =

Elm cultivar

- Genus: Ulmus
- Cultivar: 'Kansas Hybrid'
- Origin: US

Ulmus 'Kansas Hybrid' is a possible hybrid cultivar raised by the Kansas Nursery Co. in Salina, Kansas in the 1920s from a seedling exhibiting hybrid characteristics, and maintained by grafting. The inclusion of the word "hybrid" is considered to render the cultivar name invalid.

== Description ==
The tree was described as having an upright branching habit, and dark, shiny leaves the same size as U. americana.

== Pests and diseases ==
'Kansas Hybrid' had not (by 1995) been widely tested for resistance to Dutch elm disease.

== Cultivation ==
Fast growing, 'KH' was also reputed to be cold and drought resistant. The tree is not known to have been introduced to Europe or Australasia.

== Accessions ==
North America

- Arnold Arboretum, US. Acc. no. 362–63, no provenance data available.
