= Ulmus americana 'Markham' =

Elm cultivar

- Species: Ulmus americana
- Cultivar: 'Markham'
- Origin: Avon, New York, US

The American elm cultivar Ulmus americana 'Markham' was cloned in Avon, New York before 1950 from "an outstanding tree", now long dead, growing naturally on what had been the Markham estate two miles north of Avon since 1794.

== Description ==
The original tree was of great size, and possessed an extremely weeping branching habit. It was partly destroyed by fire in the mid-19th century and by a storm in 1893. In 1913 its hollow trunk had a bole-girth of 45 feet and was estimated to be at least 400 years old. "Still, the veteran elm had not lost its vitality," wrote Katharine Stanley Nicholson in her Historic American trees (1922). "In the spring of 1920, after bursting into leaf, and then losing every one through an onslaught of canker worms, it rallied bravely and in a few weeks was once more in full foliage."

== Cultivation ==
It is not known whether 'Markham' remains in cultivation in North America or beyond.
