= Ulmus 'Glabra' =

Elm cultivar

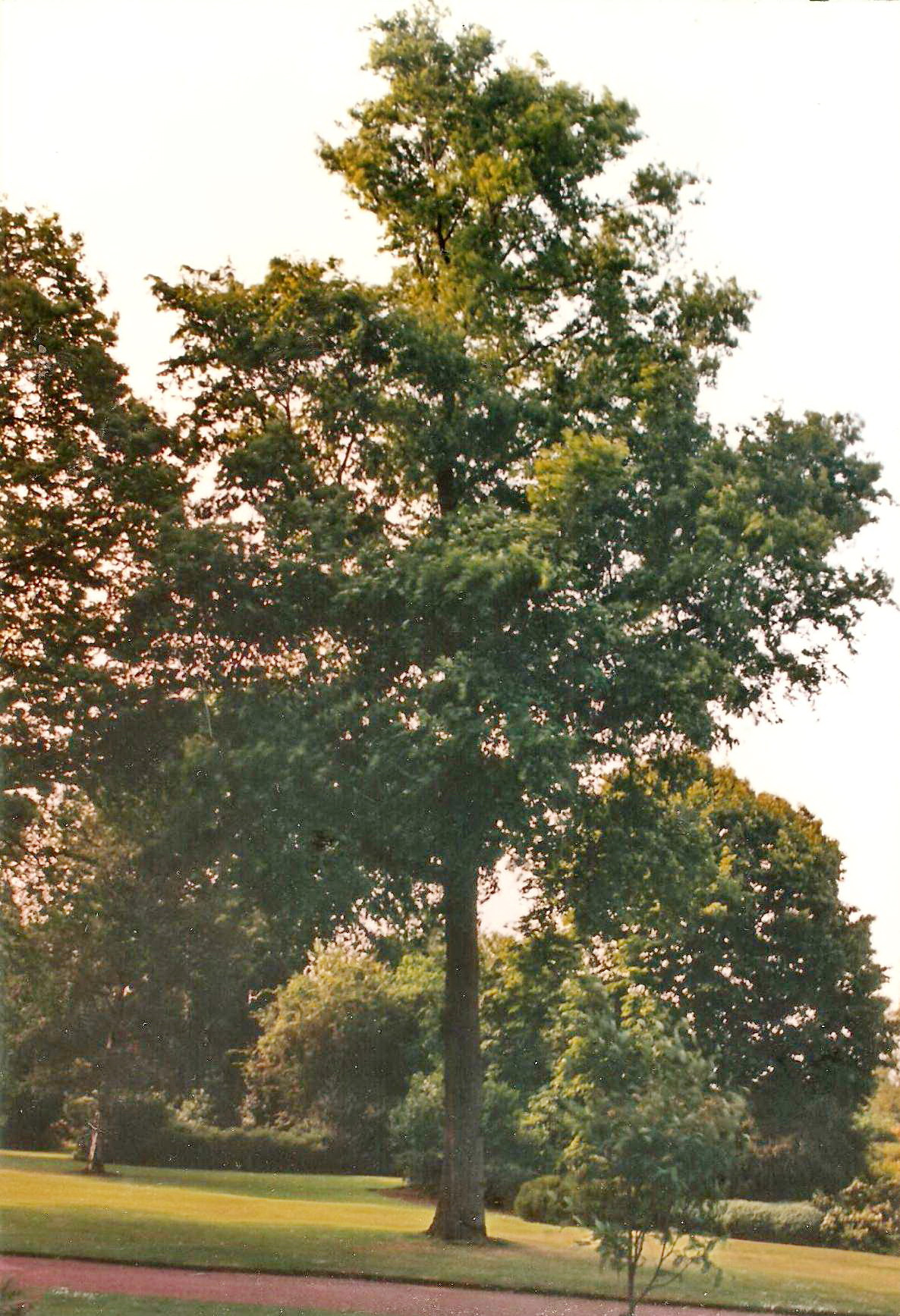
- Späth's Ulmus glabra Mill., Royal Botanic Garden, Edinburgh (1989)
- Genus: Ulmus
- Cultivar: 'Glabra'
- Origin: Späth nursery, Berlin, Germany

The elm cultivar Ulmus 'Glabra' was distributed by the Späth nursery, Berlin, in the 1890s and early 1900s as U. glabra Mill.. Not to be confused with the species U. glabra Huds..

== Description ==
Späth's catalogue described the tree as having smooth shiny dark green leaves. Melville (1958) described the specimen from Späth in Royal Botanic Garden Edinburgh (see 'Cultivation') as "a tree of 15 m with very long pendulous branches".

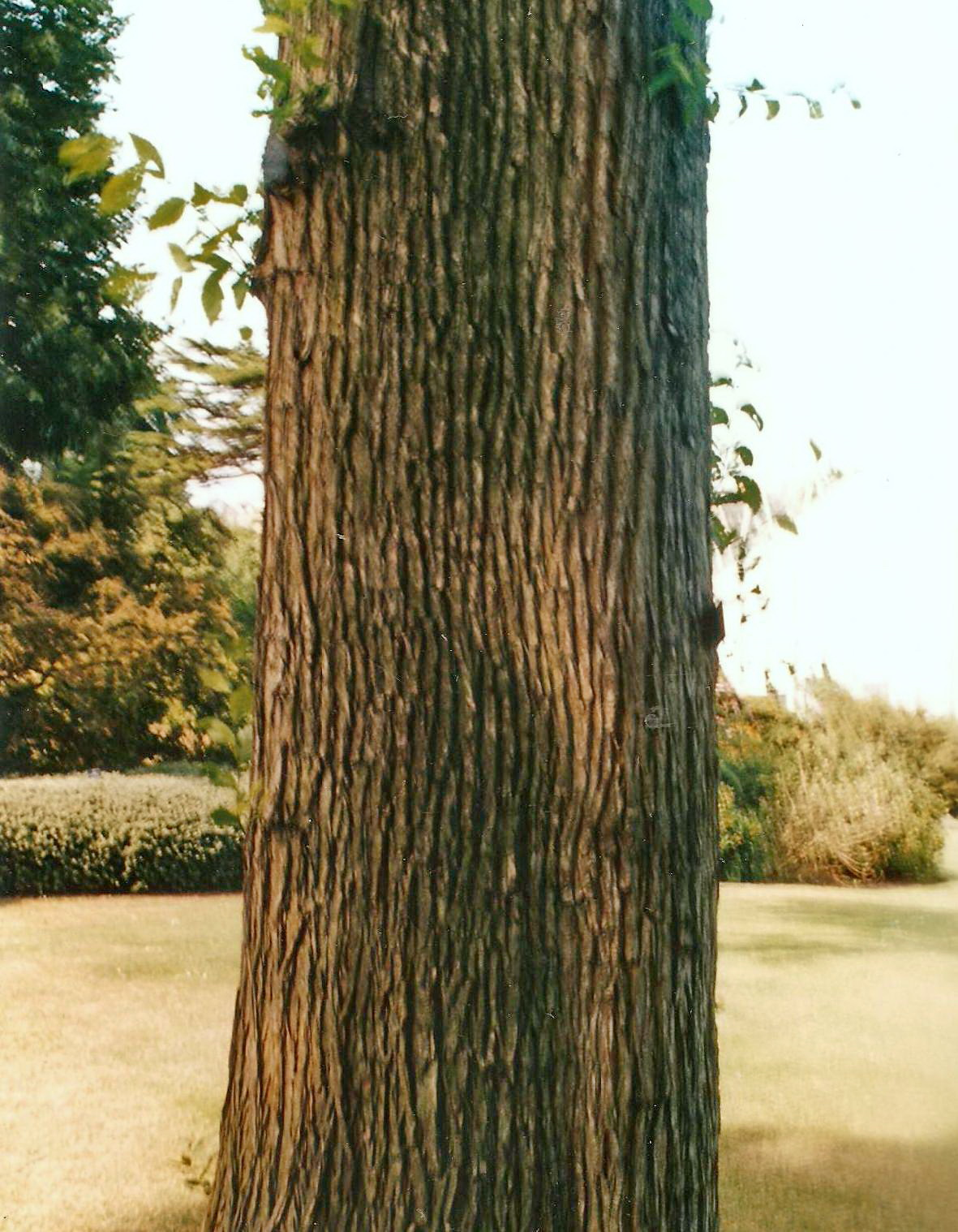
Bark of Späth's Ulmus glabra Mill., RBGE (1989)

== Pests and diseases ==
The RBGE specimen was killed by Dutch elm disease in the 1990s.

== Cultivation ==
One tree was planted in 1896 as U. glabra Mill. at the Dominion Arboretum, Ottawa, Canada. Three specimens were supplied by Späth to the Royal Botanic Garden Edinburgh in 1902 as U. glabra. One was planted in the garden proper (tree C2716); Melville renamed it U. carpinifolia × U. plotii in 1958; the other two may survive in Edinburgh, as it was the practice of the Garden to distribute trees about the city (viz. the Wentworth Elm). The current list of Living Accessions held in the Garden does not list the plant. A tree listed as Ulmus glabra (separately from wych and field elm entries), probably obtained from Späth, stood in the Ryston Hall arboretum, Norfolk, in the early 20th century.
