= Ulmus 'Rufa' =

Elm cultivar

- Genus: Ulmus
- Cultivar: 'Rufa'
- Origin: Europe

The elm cultivar Ulmus 'Rufa' [:rufous-coloured] was listed as U. campestris f. rufa by Georg Dieck, of Zöschen, Germany, without description in Haupt-catalog der Obst- und gehölzbaumschulen des ritterguts Zöschen bei Merseburg, Nachtrag I (1887), though it had been in cultivation for some decades before this date. It was considered "possibly Ulmus carpinifolia" (: Ulmus minor) by Green.

== Description ==
Not available. An 1834 Paris herbarium specimen shows near-orbicular leaves like those of English elm.

== Cultivation ==
Ulmus rufa, 'European red elm', was marketed by Prince's nursery of Flushing, New York from the 1840s. No specimens are known to survive.
