= Ulmus 'Alata' =

Elm cultivar

- Genus: Ulmus
- Cultivar: 'Alata'
- Origin: Europe

The elm cultivar Ulmus 'Alata' was first mentioned by Kirchner, in Petzold & Kirchner, Arboretum Muscaviense 566, 1864, as Ulmus montana (: glabra) alata, but without description.

== Description ==
Considered possibly a juvenile form of Ulmus carpinifolia (: minor).

== Cultivation ==
No specimens are known to survive.
