= Ulmus × hollandica var. insularum =

Scientific classification
- Kingdom: Plantae
- Clade: Tracheophytes
- Clade: Angiosperms
- Clade: Eudicots
- Clade: Rosids
- Order: Rosales
- Family: Ulmaceae
- Genus: Ulmus
- Species: U. × hollandica
- Variety: U. × h. var. insularum

Trinomial name
- Ulmus × hollandica var. insularum Richens

Synonyms
- Ulmus insularum (Richens) J.V.Armstr. & P.D.Sell

Variety of flowering plant

Ulmus × hollandica var. insularum was recognized as a biometrically distinct population of U. × hollandica endemic to all the Channel Islands and the Cotentin Peninsula of France by Richens and Jeffers in 1975. As of January 2025, Plants of the World Online did not accept this or any other varieties of U. × hollandica, treating them all as synonyms of the hybrid species.

== Description ==
U. × hollandica var. insularum has an open canopy comprising irregular branching; the leaves are broadly ovate, < 8.5 cm long by 6 cm broad. The tree is distinguished from typical U. × hollandica and its most common cultivar, 'Vegeta', the Huntingdon Elm, by its longer (8–12 mm) petiole, greater foliar asymmetry, and more extensive axillary tufts on the lower surface of the lamina. Richens did not investigate the flowers and fruit.

== Taxonomy ==
The tree had been treated within Ulmus montana (a synonym of U. glabra) until McClintock assigned it to U. × hollandica. In 1998, Richens placed it within U. × hollandica as var. insularum. In 2018, J. V. Armstrong and P. D. Sell raised it to the full species Ulmus insularum. Clive Stace suggested that the more asymmetric leaves and longer petioles may indicate that the variety has U. minor subsp. sarniensis in its parentage.

As of January 2025, Plants of the World Online did not accept this or any other varieties of U. × hollandica, treating them all as synonyms of U. × hollandica, including what it called U. × insularum.

== Pests and diseases ==
The tree is very susceptible to Dutch elm disease.

== Cultivation ==
As of 2015, the status of the tree in the Channel Islands following the arrival of Dutch elm disease was not recorded.
