= Ulmus americana 'Iowa State' =

Elm cultivar

- Species: Ulmus americana
- Cultivar: 'Iowa State'
- Origin: Iowa State University, US

The American elm cultivar Ulmus americana 'Iowa State' was cloned in the 1980s from a tree discovered by Professor Alexander (Sandy) McNabb of Iowa State University as the sole survivor in 40 acres (16 ha) of diseased elm at Burlington.

== Description ==
The tree is possessed of a fastigiate, thickly-branched habit, but has relatively weak branch unions owing to acute angles of attachment leading to bark inclusions.

== Pests and diseases ==
'Iowa State' was reported in the American Horticulturist News Edition, 63(5):4, 1984, as "a natural selection from southeastern Iowa, highly resistant to Dutch elm disease when inoculated". The species as a whole is highly susceptible to elm yellows; it is also moderately preferred for feeding and reproduction by the adult elm leaf beetle Xanthogaleruca luteola, and highly preferred for feeding by the Japanese beetle Popillia japonica in the United States. U. americana is also the most susceptible of all the elms to verticillium wilt.

== Cultivation ==
The cultivar was trialed in Minneapolis. One of the original plantings (1978) in the Dean Park area of Minneapolis had to be felled in 2012, 34 years later, after serious defects developed.
