= Ulmus americana 'Maine' =

Elm cultivar

- Species: Ulmus americana
- Cultivar: 'Maine'
- Origin: US

'Maine' is a selection of the American elm Ulmus americana made by the USNA for use in disease-resistance trials. It has not been formally registered as a cultivar.

== Description ==
Not available.

== Pests and diseases ==
'Maine' proved particularly susceptible to Dutch elm disease exhibiting 30% crown dieback in one year after inoculation with the disease's causal fungus.

== Cultivation ==
The tree it is not known to have been cultivated beyond the United States.

== Accessions ==
=== North America ===
None known.
