= Ulmus laevis 'Helena' =

Elm cultivar

- Species: Ulmus laevis
- Cultivar: 'Helena'
- Origin: Europe

The European White Elm cultivar Ulmus laevis 'Helena' is a Dutch introduction in commerce circa 2010 at the Boomkwekerij s'Herenland at Randwijk (PBR applied for: EU 20142249). The cultivar was cloned from a tree planted as one of a line of 17 White Elms at Eibergen circa 1900, which developed a straight central leader.

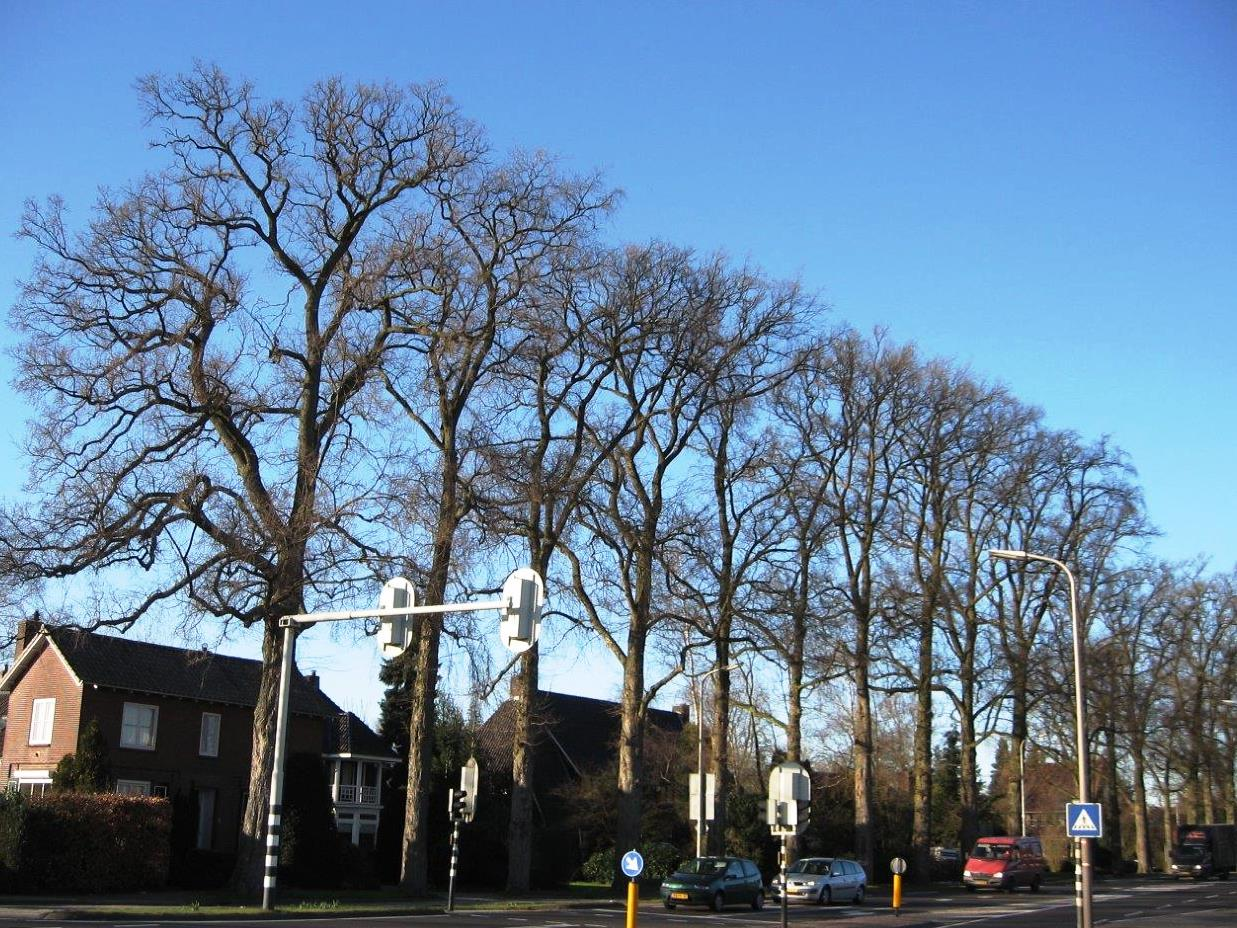
The 17 U. laevis at Eibergen

== Description ==
The tree is described as having upright, uniform, growth, producing yellow leaves in autumn. At age 100, 'Helena' should be approximately 22 m high, with a crown diameter of about 12 m.

== Cultivation ==
'Helena' is judged 'sustainable and durable in public parks', but has not been planted beyond the Netherlands (2016). The cultivar was planted among the line of 140 elms on the ‘s-Gravelandsevaartweg, Loosdrecht, part of Wijdemeren City Council's elm collection, assembled since 2003 by tree manager Martin Tijdgat and his colleagues.

== Accessions ==
None known

== Nurseries ==
=== Europe ===
- The Tree Centre, Opheusden, Netherlands
- Van Den Berk (UK) Ltd., , London, UK
