= Ulmus americana 'Kimley' =

Elm cultivar

- Species: Ulmus americana
- Cultivar: 'Kimley'
- Origin: Oshawa, Ontario, Canada

The American elm cultivar Ulmus americana 'Kimley' was cloned c.1957 by the Sheridan Nurseries, Mississauga, Canada, from a large tree found near Oshawa, Ontario, Canada.

== Description ==
The tree was distinguished by its fine, pendulous habit.

== Pests and diseases ==
No specific information available, but the species as a whole is highly susceptible to Dutch elm disease and elm yellows; it is also moderately preferred for feeding and reproduction by the adult elm leaf beetle Xanthogaleruca luteola, and highly preferred for feeding by the Japanese beetle Popillia japonica in the United States. U. americana is also the most susceptible of all the elms to verticillium wilt.

== Cultivation ==
The tree was first marketed in 1957, but is not known to remain in cultivation.
