= Ulmus americana 'Nigricans' =

Elm cultivar

- Species: Ulmus americana
- Cultivar: 'Nigricans'
- Origin: Zöschener Baumschule, Germany

The American elm cultivar Ulmus americana 'Nigricans' Dieck was cloned from a selection made from seedlings raised by the Zöschener Baumschule, Zöschen, Germany, and listed by Georg Dieck with a brief description in Haupt-catalog der Obst- und gehölzbaumschulen des ritterguts Zöschen bei Merseburg, 1885.

An 'American Black Elm', "a variety of Ulmus americana of more erect habit", was marketed by Trumbull and Beebe's nursery, San Francisco, in the 1890s, along with a batch of other European elm cultivars.

== Description ==
The tree was distinguished by its very dark green foliage. Occasionally listed as 'Nigrescens', it has caused confusion with a U. minor cultivar of that name.

== Cultivation ==
No specimens are known to survive.

== Synonymy ==
- U. americana f. nigrescens Dieck: Schelle in Beissner et al. Handbuch der Laubholz-Benennung 87. 1903.
