= Ulmus 'Nigrescens' =

Elm cultivar

- Genus: Ulmus
- Cultivar: 'Nigrescens'
- Origin: Europe

The elm cultivar Ulmus 'Nigrescens' was identified by Pynaert as Ulmus campestris betulaefolia nigrescens. Considered by Green to be "probably Ulmus carpinifolia (: minor), but said to have been raised from seed of Purpurea".

== Description ==
The tree was described as having leaves like those of the Birch, and with a darker and more persistent hue than the Wych Elm cultivar 'Purpurea'.

== Cultivation ==
No specimens are known to survive.

== Synonymy ==
NB. Nigricans: Bailey & Bailey, Hortus 625, 1930, as U. (americana) nigricans, name in synonymy for U. americana f. nigrescens, not U. campestris betulifoliae nigrescens Pynaert.
