= Ulmus glabra 'Oblongata' =

Elm cultivar

- Species: Ulmus glabra
- Cultivar: 'Oblongata'
- Origin: Europe

The Wych Elm cultivar Ulmus glabra 'Oblongata' was identified as Ulmus oblongata by Koch in Dendrologie; Bäume, Sträucher und Halbsträucher, welche in Mittel- und Nord- Europa im Freien kultivirt werden 2 (1): 415, 1872.

== Description ==
The tree was described as having a broad, oblong leaf without apical teeth.

== Cultivation ==
No specimens are known to survive.
