= Ulmus 'Klemmer Blanc' =

Elm cultivar

- Genus: Ulmus
- Cultivar: 'Klemmer Blanc'
- Origin: Belgium

The elm cultivar Ulmus 'Klemmer Blanc' was described by Feneau in Bulletin de la Société centrale forestière de Belgique (1902) as an intermediate between 'Klemmer' and 'Belgica', the Belgian Elm.

== Description ==
The leaves are smaller than 'Klemmer', and the trees do not produce root suckers. Moreover, the timber is white and softer than 'Klemmer'.

== Cultivation ==
No specimens are known to survive.
