= Ulmus glabra 'Minor' =

Elm cultivar

- Species: Ulmus glabra
- Cultivar: 'Minor'
- Origin: England

The Wych Elm cultivar Ulmus glabra 'Minor' was described by Loudon in Arboretum et Fruticetum Britannicum 3: 1398, 1838.

== Description ==
Loudon described the tree as having "more branching and spreading habit, of lower growth, with more twiggy shoots and these more densely clothed with leaves".

== Cultivation ==
No specimens are known to survive.
