= Ulmus glabra 'Firma' =

Elm cultivar

- Species: Ulmus glabra
- Cultivar: 'Firma'
- Origin: Europe

The Wych Elm cultivar Ulmus glabra 'Firma' was described by Schneider in 1904.

== Description ==
The tree was described as having leaves like the species but firmer in texture.

== Cultivation ==
No specimens are known to survive.
