= Ulmus glabra 'Tomentosa' =

Elm cultivar

- Species: Ulmus glabra
- Cultivar: 'Tomentosa'
- Origin: Europe

The Wych Elm cultivar Ulmus glabra 'Tomentosa' was first listed as Ulmus tomentosa by Kirchner in Arboretum Muscaviense (1864). The Hesse Nursery of Weener, Germany, distributed an Ulmus montana tomentosa in the 1930s. Green listed it as a wych elm cultivar.

== Description ==
The tree was later described as having the undersides of the leaves covered with thick, soft hairs, giving a pronounced grey-green appearance.

== Cultivation ==
A 'Tomentosa' is listed in the Red Data Book of the Baltic Region (1993), suggesting that the cultivar may still survive there. It is not known to be in cultivation elsewhere.

== Synonymy ==
- Ulmus tomentosa: Petzold & Kirchner
