= Ulmus americana 'Star' =

Elm cultivar

- Species: Ulmus americana
- Cultivar: 'Star'
- Origin: Plumfield Nurseries, Fremont, Nebraska, US

The American elm cultivar Ulmus americana 'Star' was a selection made by the Plumfield Nursery, Fremont, Nebraska, c. 1945.

== Description ==
'Star' was cloned by grafting cuttings from a local tree of compact growth with a much-branched, globose crown, very compact, but ultimately 'not as tall as others' (presumably other American elms).

== Cultivation ==
'Star' was first marketed by the Plumfield Nursery (ceased trading c. 1980) in 1957; without any known resistance to Dutch elm disease, it is unlikely the tree remains in cultivation in North America or beyond.
