= Ulmus laevis 'Ornata' =

Elm cultivar

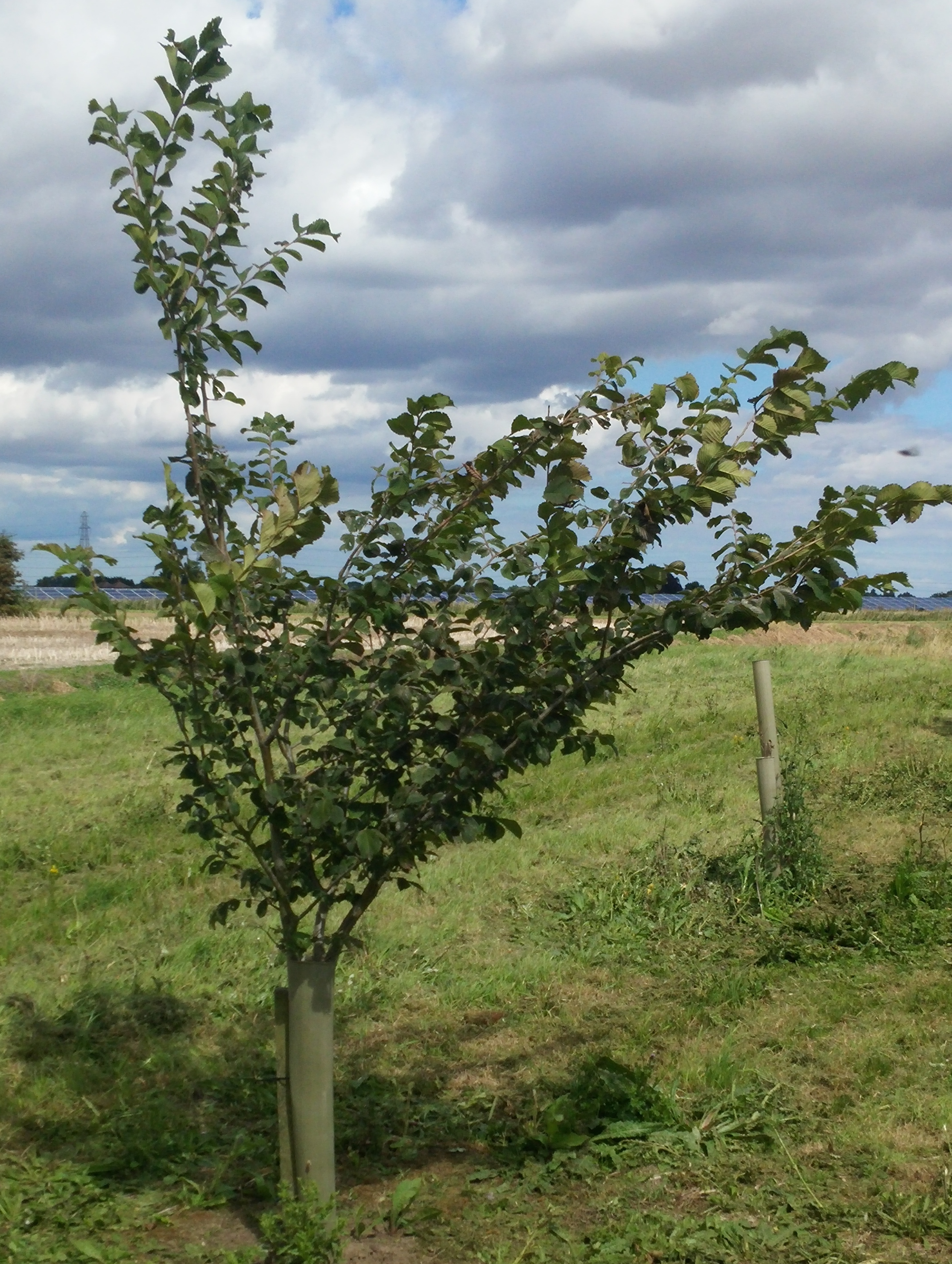
- 'Ornata', Grange Farm Arboretum
- Species: Ulmus laevis
- Cultivar: 'Ornata'
- Origin: France

The European White Elm cultivar Ulmus laevis 'Ornata' was erroneously identified by Carrière as U. communis (: glabra) ornata in 1858. 'Ornata' was named by Carrière for the numerous and intensely green leaves which gave the trees 'a magnificent appearance'.

== Description ==
Reputed to be a vigorous strain, with dark green leaves, the tree is suited to planting by roads, public squares or in landscaped gardens. The bark of the young buds is of a dark red, with very fine hairs, the leaves are thin, soft to the touch, largely oval or almost cordate, green above, paler below. While the leaves of most trees in the area were eaten to a skeleton, those of 'Ornata' remained unaffected. Seed propagated plants largely kept the characteristics of their parent.

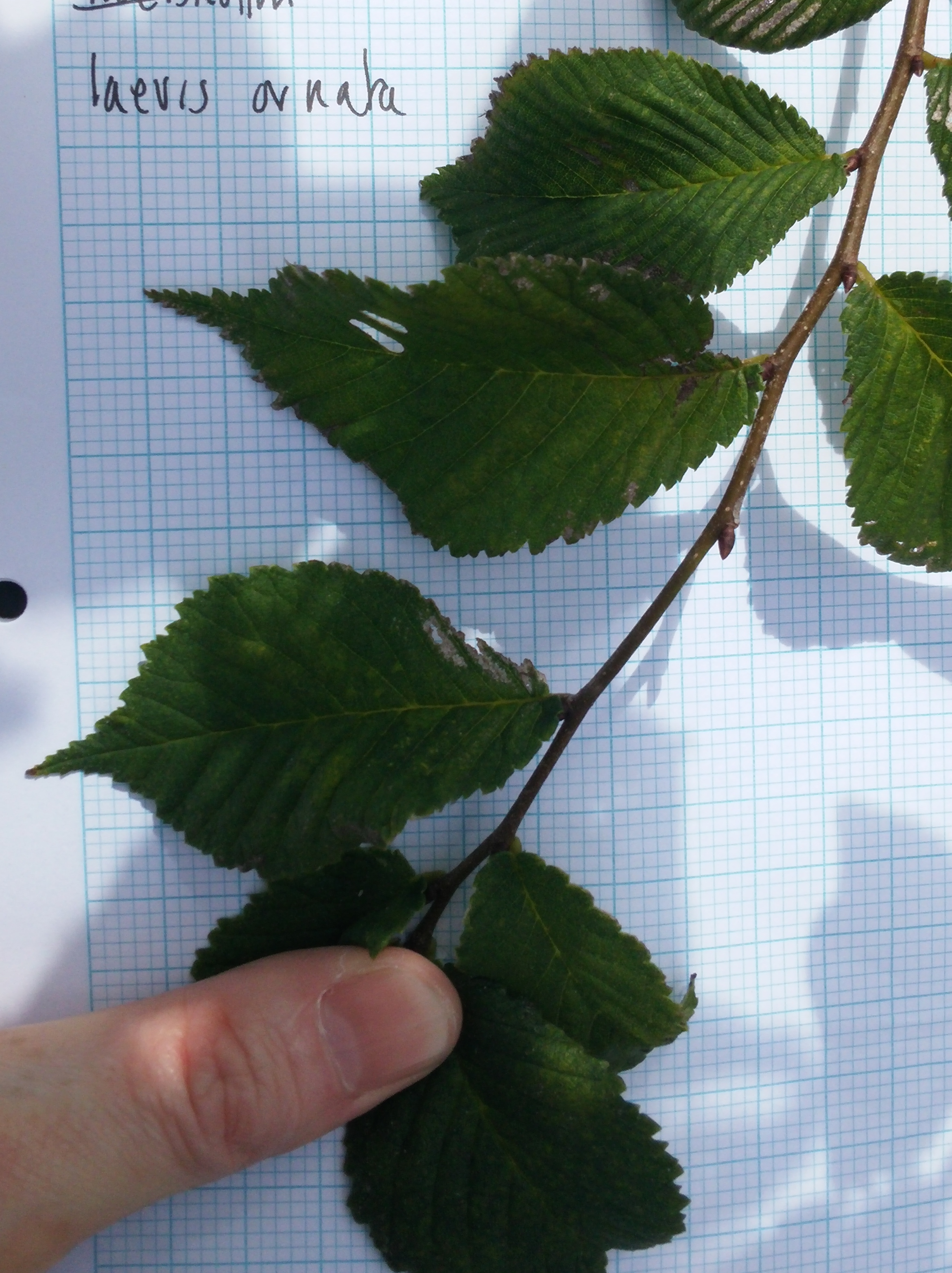
'Ornata' leaves at Grange Farm Arboretum

== Cultivation ==
Yvette de Ferré noted in 1964 that in the Jardin des Plantes, Toulouse, one tree was growing at the Palais Royal, another at the Jardin du Palais du Maréchal, two or three at the Grand Rond, and one in the precincts by the Faculty of Sciences, at the corner of the Jules-Guesde and La Boulingrin.

== Accessions ==
=== Europe ===
- Grange Farm Arboretum, Sutton St James, Spalding, Lincolnshire, UK; grafted cutting from tree in Square Boulingrin, Toulouse. Acc. no. 1073.
