= Ulmus americana 'Variegata' =

Elm cultivar

- Species: Ulmus americana
- Cultivar: 'Variegata'
- Origin: Belgium

The so-called American elm cultivar Ulmus americana 'Variegata' was a Belgian clone mentioned by Wesmael in Bulletin de la Fédération des sociétés d'horticulture de Belgique, 1862, as Ulmus americana var. variegata Hort. It was marketed by the Baudriller nursery of Angers as U. americana foliis variegatis. Wesmael's herbarium specimens, however, held in the Botanic Garden, Meise, both of his Ulmus americana and of his Ulmus americana var. variegata, do not appear to show American white elm leaves. It is known that nurseries in Europe and America marketed the golden wych elm Ulmus glabra 'Lutescens' as Ulmus americana aurea, and it is likely that Wesmael's Ulmus americana variegata was similarly misnamed, and perhaps derived from a reverting branch of aurea, whose leaves it resembled.

The Ulmus americana variegata, "American variegated elm", marketed by the Klehm nursery of Arlington Heights, Illinois, in the early 20th century, may, however, have been variegated American white elm, as the nursery was familiar with the native species. A 2018 Cornell study of the surviving elms of the National Mall, Washington D.C., listed some 28 specimens of a "distinctive striped cultivar, possibly U. americana ", but this referred to vertical fissuring in young bark, not to variegated leaves.

== Description ==
Wesmael's herbarium specimen shows a young ‘Lutescens’-type leaf with mixed variegation and green. Klehm's Ulmus americana variegata had small leaves sprinkled over with white spots, the variation being described as constant.

== Cultivation ==
No specimens are known to survive.
