= Ulmus glabra 'Spectabilis' =

Elm cultivar

- Species: Ulmus glabra
- Cultivar: 'Spectabilis'
- Origin: Denmark

The Wych Elm cultivar Ulmus glabra 'Spectabilis' appeared circa 1915 at the Pallesens Nursery, Kølding, Denmark.

== Description ==
The tree was selected for its extremely rapid growth in its early years.

== Cultivation ==
No specimens are known to survive.
