= Ulmus davidiana var. japonica 'Reperta' =

Elm cultivar

- Variety: Ulmus davidiana var. japonica
- Cultivar: 'Reperta'
- Origin: University of Wisconsin, US

The Japanese Elm cultivar Ulmus davidiana var. japonica 'Reperta' was a University of Wisconsin–Madison selection (no. 43–2) named and registered in Germany by Conrad-Appel, Darmstadt, in 1993.

== Description ==
Not available.

== Pests and diseases ==
'Reperta' has only a moderate resistance to Dutch elm disease.

== Cultivation ==
'Reperta' never entered commerce in North America or Europe owing to its only marginal resistance to DED. A specimen grown at the Botanischer Garten Marburg, Marburg, Germany, obtained in 1993, died while still a young plant, apparently unable to tolerate the local climate.

== Accessions ==
None.
