= Urbain Audibert =

French botanist

Urbain Audibert (27 February 1789 – 22 July 1846) was a French nurseryman. He was born in Tarascon on 27 February 1789 and died on 22 July 1846. He made contributions to a few plant species descriptions.

He collected plants in the vicinity of Montpellier with Alire Raffeneau Delile and Michel Félix Dunal, in Avignon with Esprit Requien and in the Pyrenees with George Bentham. He made herbarium specimens from plants cultivated in his nursery.

The genus Audibertia (family Lamiaceae) is named in his honor.
