= Breeding of elms resistant to Dutch elm disease =

Since Dutch elm disease started to destroy elm populations in Europe and America, research has been conducted in many countries to create resistant cultivars and hybrids. Work began in the Netherlands in 1928, followed by research on Ulmus americana cultivars in the United States in 1937. More recently, trials have attempted to create cultivars suitable for local conditions in different countries.

== History ==
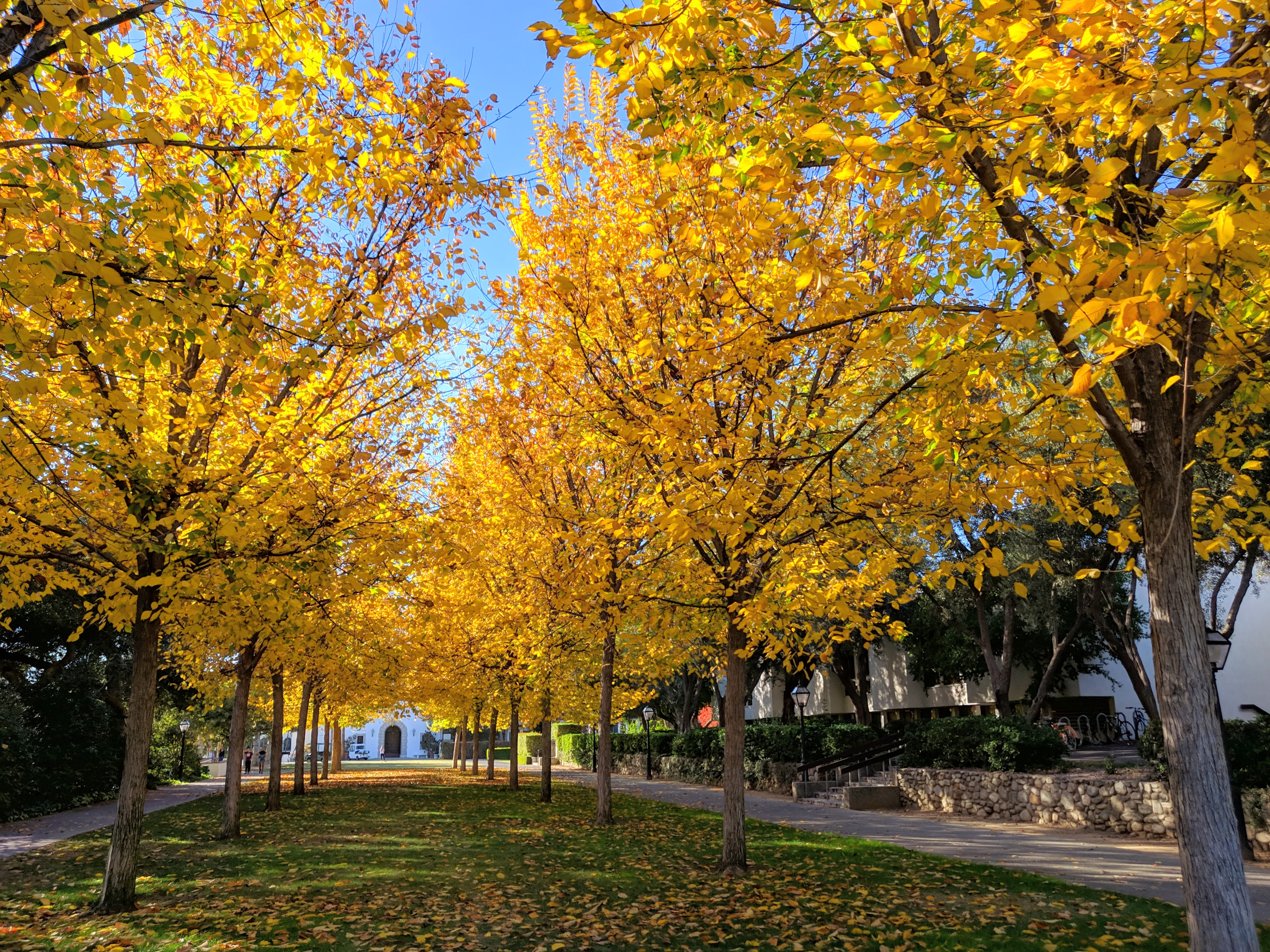
Row of Princeton elm trees at Scripps College in Claremont, California, 2008, resistant to Dutch elm disease

Research to select resistant cultivars and varieties began in the Netherlands in 1928, followed by work on Ulmus americana cultivars in the United States in 1937. U. americana is incompatible with European elms, preventing breeders from making hybrids that visually resemble the vase-shaped American elm and that have resistance to the disease.

In 2005, the USA's National Elm Trial began a 10-year evaluation of 19 cultivars in plantings across the United States. The trees in the trial were exclusively American developments; no European cultivars were included. Based on the trial's final ratings, the preferred cultivars of U. americana are 'New Harmony' and 'Princeton'. The preferred cultivars of Asian elms are the Morton Arboretum introductions and 'New Horizon'.

Research in Sweden has established that early-flushing clones are less susceptible to Dutch elm disease, owing to an asynchrony between disease susceptibility and infection.

== Testing for disease resistance ==
Elms are tested for resistance by inoculation with the fungal pathogen in late May when the tree's growth is at its annual peak. Clones raised for testing are grown to an age of 3 or 4 years. In Europe, the inoculum is introduced into the cambium by a knife wound. However this method, developed in the Netherlands, was considered too severe in America, where the principal disease vector is the bark beetle Scolytus multistriatus, a far less effective vector than the larger beetle endemic to Europe, Scolytus scolytus, which is unknown in America. In the method devised by the USDA, the inoculum is introduced to the cambium via a 2 mm-diameter hole drilled through the bark in the lower third of the tree. This method was further refined by the University of Wisconsin team, which drilled holes in the branches to simulate natural infection by the bark beetles feeding in the twig crotches, but results from this method were found to exaggerate the genetic resistance of the host. Consequently, tests were conducted on specimens in a controlled environment, either in greenhouses or customized plant chambers, facilitating more accurate evaluation of both internal and external symptoms of disease.

Another variable is the composition of the inoculum; while an inoculum strength of 10^{6} spores / ml is standard in both continents, its composition reflects the different Ophiostoma species, subspecies and hybrids endemic to the two continents. In Italy for example, two subspecies, americana and novo-ulmi, are present together with their hybrid, whereas in North America, ssp. novo-ulmi is unknown. The differences in method and inocula possibly explain why the American cultivar 'Princeton', displaying high resistance in the US, has often succumbed to Dutch elm disease in Europe.

== Hybrid cultivars ==
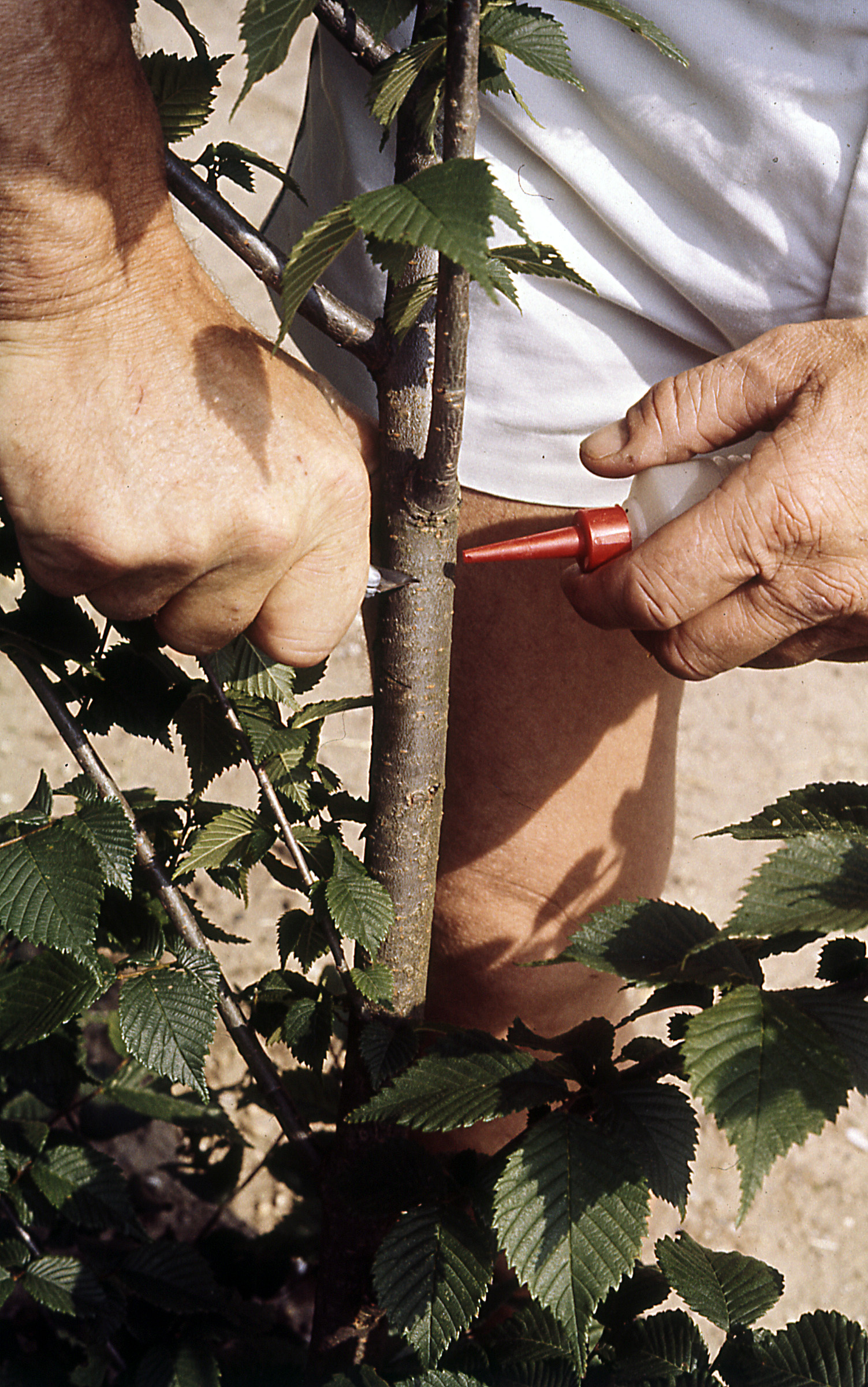
Inoculation of virulent strains of Ophiostoma in elm cambium, Dorschkamp Institute for Forestry and Landscape Planning, Wageningen, 1984

Many attempts to breed disease-resistant cultivar hybrids have involved a genetic contribution from Asian elm species that are demonstrably resistant to this fungal disease. Much of the early work was undertaken in the Netherlands. The Dutch research programme began in 1928, and ended in 1992. During those 64 years, well over 1000 cultivars were raised and evaluated. Still in use are cultivars such as 'Groeneveld', 'Lobel', 'Dodoens', 'Clusius' and 'Plantijn', although the resistance levels in these trees aren't high enough to confer good protection. The programme had three major successes: 'Columella', 'Nanguen' Lutèce, and 'Wanoux' Vada, all found to have an extremely high resistance to the disease when inoculated with unnaturally large doses of the fungus. Only 'Columella' was released during the Dutch programme's lifetime—-in 1987.

Asian species in the American Dutch elm disease research programs were the Siberian elm U. pumila, Japanese elm U. davidiana var. japonica, and the Chinese elm U. parvifolia, which gave rise to several dozen hybrid cultivars resistant both to the disease and to the extreme cold of Asian winters. Among the most widely planted of these, both in North America and in Europe, are 'Sapporo Autumn Gold', 'New Horizon' and 'Rebona'. Some hybrid cultivars, such as 'Regal' and 'Pioneer' are the product of both Dutch and American research. Hybridization experiments using the slippery (or red) elm U. rubra resulted in the release of 'Coolshade' and 'Rosehill' in the 1940s and 50s; the species last featured in hybridization as the female parent of 'Repura' and 'Revera', both patented in 1993, although neither has yet appeared in commerce.

In Italy, research was initiated at the Istituto per la Protezione delle Piante, Florence, to produce a range of disease-resistant trees adapted to the warmer Mediterranean climate, using a variety of Asiatic species crossed with the early Dutch hybrid 'Plantyn' as a safeguard against any future mutation of the disease. Two trees with very high levels of resistance, 'San Zanobi' and 'Plinio', were released in 2003. 'Arno' and 'Fiorente' were patented in 2006 and entered commerce in 2012. All four have the Siberian elm U. pumila as a parent, the source of disease-resistance and drought-tolerance genes. 'Morfeo' was released in 2011; it arose from a crossing of the Dutch hybrid clone '405' (female parent) and the Chenmou Elm, the latter a small tree from the provinces of Anhui and Jiangsu in eastern China, The '405' clone is a crossing of an English U. × hollandica and a French U. minor.

== Species and species cultivars ==
=== North America ===
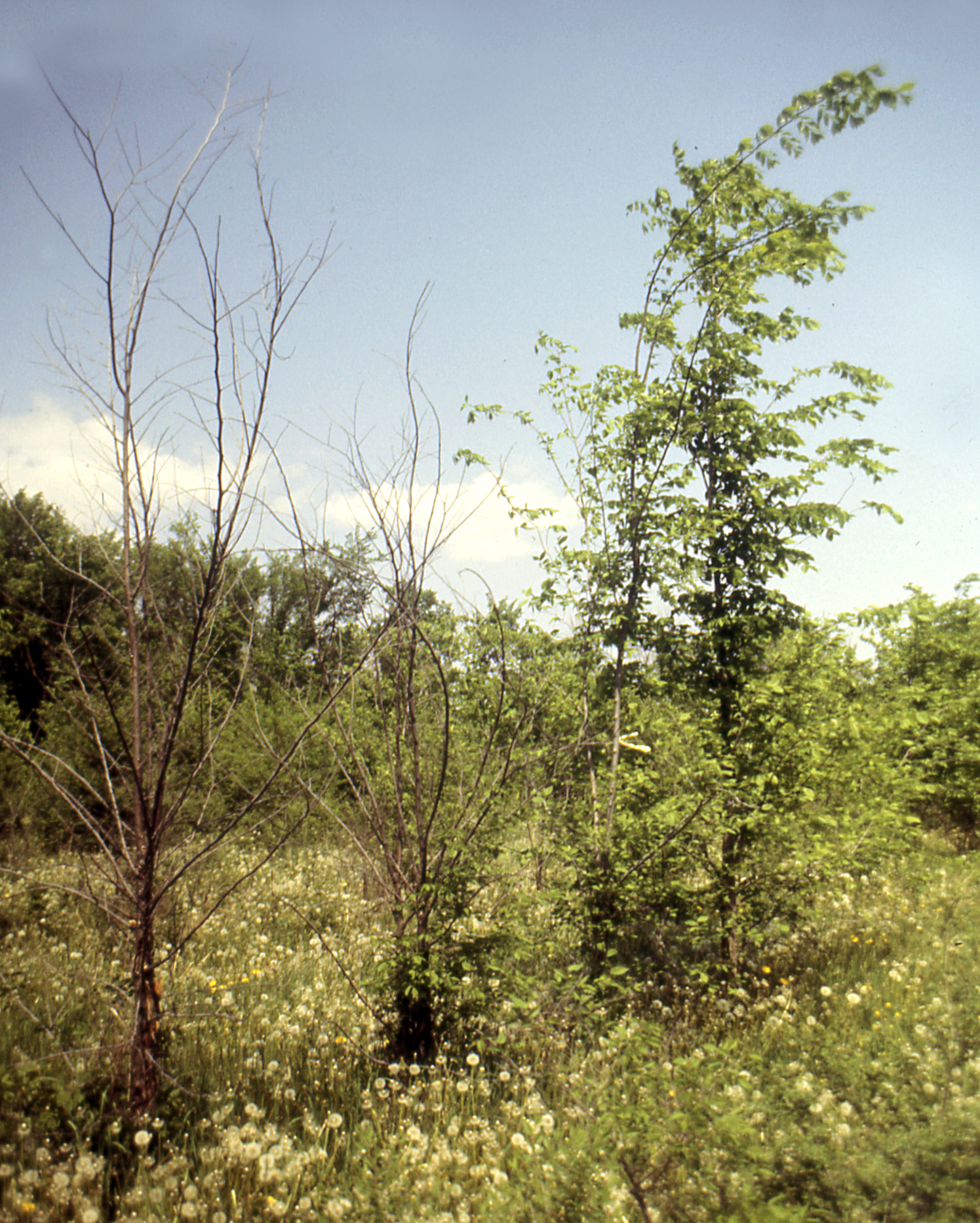
Results of artificial inoculation of Ophiostoma strains in elm cambium, Arlington Experimental Station, Wisconsin, 1987

Ten resistant American elm cultivars are in commerce in North America. No cultivar is immune to the disease; even highly resistant cultivars can become infected, particularly if already stressed by drought or other environmental conditions where the disease prevalence is high. With the exception of 'Princeton', no trees have yet been grown to maturity; trees cannot be said to be mature until they have reached an age of 60 years.

The cultivars include:

- 'Princeton', is a cultivar selected in 1922 by Princeton Nurseries for its landscape merit. By coincidence, this cultivar was found to be highly resistant in inoculation studies carried out by the USDA in the early 1990s. As trees planted in the 1920s still survive, the properties of the mature plant are well known. However, 'Princeton' has not proven resistant in Europe, where the main vector of the disease—the larger elm bark beetle, Scolytus scolytus—is capable of introducing far more fungal spores into the tree; many of the 50 trees planted at Highgrove House in the south-west of England in 2006 had died from Dutch elm disease by 2011.
- 'American Liberty', is, in fact, a set of six cultivars of moderate to high resistance produced through selection over several generations starting in the 1970s. Although 'American Liberty' is marketed as a single variety, nurseries selling the "Liberty Elm" actually distribute the six cultivars at random and thus, unfortunately, the resistance of any particular tree cannot be known. One of the cultivars, 'Independence', is covered by patent (U. S. Plant patent 6227). The oldest 'American Liberty' elm was planted in about 1980.
- 'Valley Forge', released in 1995, has demonstrated the highest resistance of all the clones to Dutch elm disease in controlled USDA tests.
- 'Lewis and Clark' = Prairie Expedition TM , released in 2004 to commemorate the bicentenary of the Lewis & Clark expedition, was cloned from a tree found growing in North Dakota which had survived unscathed when all around had succumbed to disease.

In 2007, the Elm Recovery Project of the University of Guelph Arboretum in Ontario, Canada, reported that cuttings from healthy surviving old elms surveyed across Ontario had been grown to produce a bank of resistant trees, isolated for selective breeding of highly resistant cultivars.

The University of Minnesota USA is testing various elms, including a huge now-patented century-old survivor known as "The St. Croix Elm", which is located in a Minneapolis-St. Paul, MN suburb (Afton) in the St. Croix River valley—a designated National Scenic Riverway.

The slippery or red elm U. rubra is marginally less susceptible to Dutch elm disease than the other American species, but this quality seems to have been largely ignored in American research. No cultivars were ever selected, although the tree was used in hybridization experiments.

In 1993, Mariam B. Sticklen and James L. Sherald reported the results of NPS-funded experiments conducted at Michigan State University in East Lansing that were designed to apply genetic engineering techniques to the development of DED-resistant strains of American elm trees. In 2007, AE Newhouse and F Schrodt of the State University of New York College of Environmental Science and Forestry in Syracuse reported that young transgenic American elm trees had shown reduced symptoms and normal mycorrhizal colonization. By 2013, researchers in both New York State and North Carolina were conducting field trials of genetically engineered disease-resistant American elms.

=== Europe ===
Among European species, there is the unique example of the European white elm U. laevis, which has little innate resistance to Dutch elm disease, but is eschewed by the vector bark beetles and only rarely becomes infected. Recent research has indicated it is the presence of certain organic compounds, such as triterpenes and sterols, which serves to make the tree bark unattractive to the beetle species that spread the disease.

In Europe the testing of clones of surviving field elms for innate resistance has been carried out since the 1990s by national research institutes, with findings centrally assessed and published. The first results of this ongoing project suggest that in some countries a very small number of native field elm genotypes have comparatively high levels of tolerance to Dutch elm disease. In Spain, for example, of around 5,000 native elms evaluated to 2013, some 25 genotypes (0.5% of those tested) fall into this category; and it is now hoped that the controlled crossing of the best seven of these (genetically and aesthetically) will produce Ulmus minor hybrids with effective 'field resistance' and market appeal. Similar results are beginning to emerge in trials on surviving field elms in Greece.

==== United Kingdom ====
Much of the work in the United Kingdom is by the Forestry Commission's research arm, which has had Dutch elm disease on its agenda since the 1920s. In 1994 a Research Information Note (no 252) was published, written by John Gibbs, Clive Brasier and Joan Webber, and in 2010 a Pathology Advisory Note, as well as throughout the period a stream of more academic papers: notable results have been the observation that the progress of the disease through Scotland has been quite slow, and that genetic engineering has been tried to improve the resistance of the English elm.

In England the Conservation Foundation had been propagating, distributing and planting clones of surviving indigenous elms, including field elms (but not the highly susceptible English elm), as part of a scheme to return elms to city and countryside. The Foundation was running two elm programmes: the 'Great British Elm Experiment' and 'Ulmus londinium', an elm programme for London – these use saplings cultivated through micropropagation from mature parent elms found growing in the British countryside: parent trees are monitored for disease, while saplings were offered free to schools and community groups, who are asked to monitor their trees' progress on the Foundation's online elm map; in London, places with 'elm' in their name were offered a sapling – in an attempt to find out why some elms have survived while others succumbed to Dutch elm disease. Both these projects have been discontinued.

The spread of Dutch elm diseaseto Scotland has focussed attention on a small number of wych elms U. glabra surviving in areas of high infectivity, prompting the Royal Botanic Garden Edinburgh to begin a programme of selecting trees, with a view to determining innate resistance (2009). The Garden is raising and distributing in Scotland seedlings derived from controlled crosses of rare survivors in these areas (2023).

In 2001–2004, English elm U. minor 'Atinia' was genetically engineered to resist disease, in experiments at Abertay University, Dundee, Scotland, by transferring antifungal genes into the elm genome using minute DNA-coated ball bearings.

==== Spain ====
In Spain, the Escuela Técnica Superior de Ingenieros de Montes, Universidad Politecnica de Madrid, charged with discovering disease-resistant elms for use in forestry, has raised and patented seven cultivars of the field elm Ulmus minor, although two have subsequently been found to have Siberian elm U. pumila DNA, the species introduced to Spain in the 16th century. Although none have been released to commerce (2020), the clone 'Ademuz', pure U. minor, has been imported into the UK since 2014, and widely planted there.
