= Washington Road Elm Allée =

- U.S. National Register of Historic Places
- New Jersey Register of Historic Places
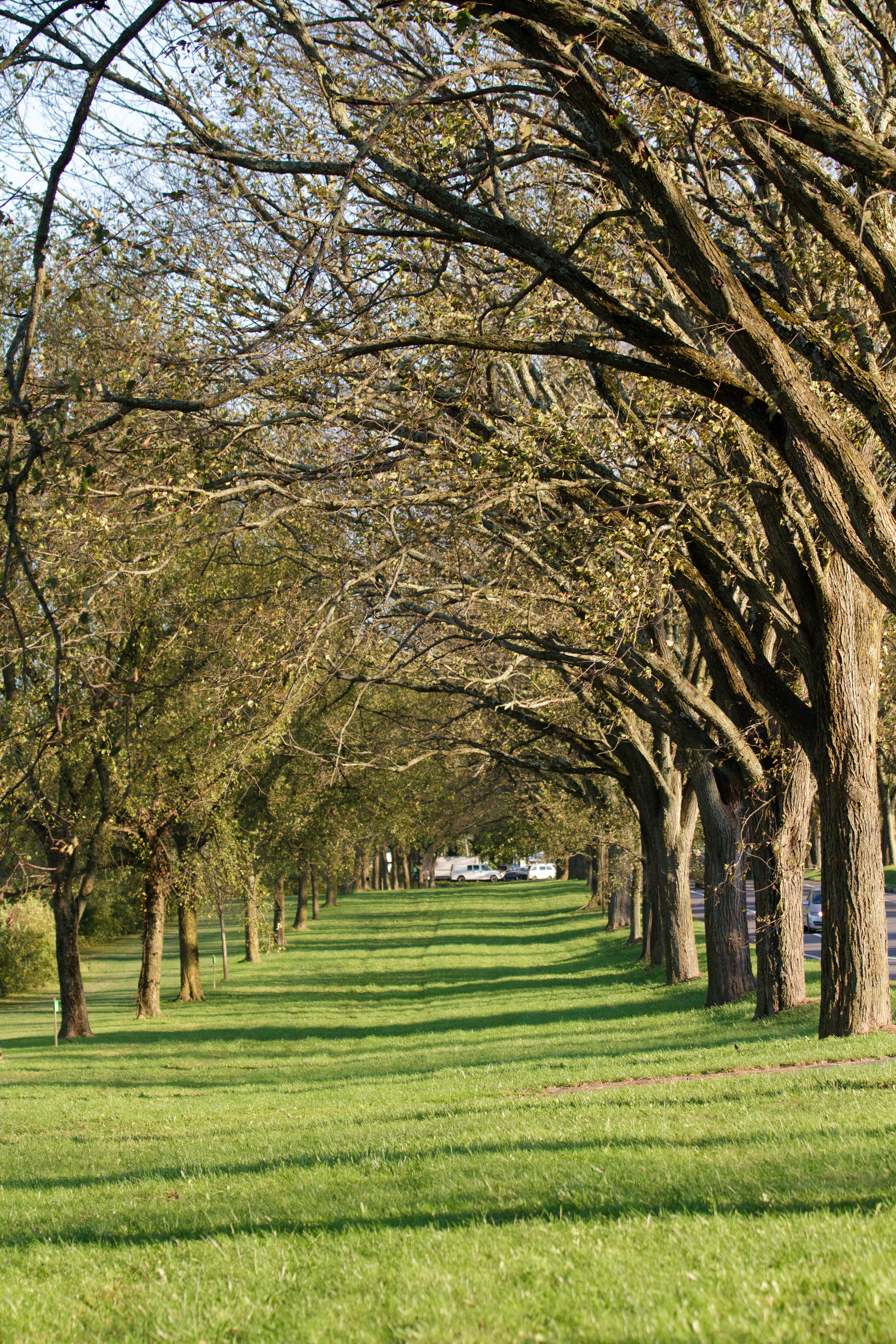
- The easternmost of the triple allées, facing south toward U.S. Route One

- Location within Mercer County, New Jersey Location within New Jersey Location within the United States
- Location: Washington Road between the Delaware and Raritan Canal and U.S. Route One
- Coordinates: 40°20′04.8″N 74°38′31.7″W
- Area: 6 acres (2.4 ha)
- Built: planted mid-1920s
- Architect: Princeton nurseries
- Architectural style: Tree avenue
- NRHP reference No.: 98001571
- NJRHP No.: 3291

Significant dates
- Added to NRHP: January 14, 1999
- Designated NJRHP: November 12, 1998

The Washington Road Elm Allée is a 0.7-mile-long (1.1 km) stretch of Washington Road in West Windsor, New Jersey that is lined with Princeton Elm trees. The allée runs through the West Windsor fields of Princeton University and provides, along with the bridge over Lake Carnegie, a dramatic entrance to the campus. The Delaware and Raritan Canal can be found at the northern end of the allée, just before the lake. A jogging path runs through the allée and connects to the canal towpath, the main campus of the university, and other trails through the adjacent fields.

== History ==
=== Elm Allée ===
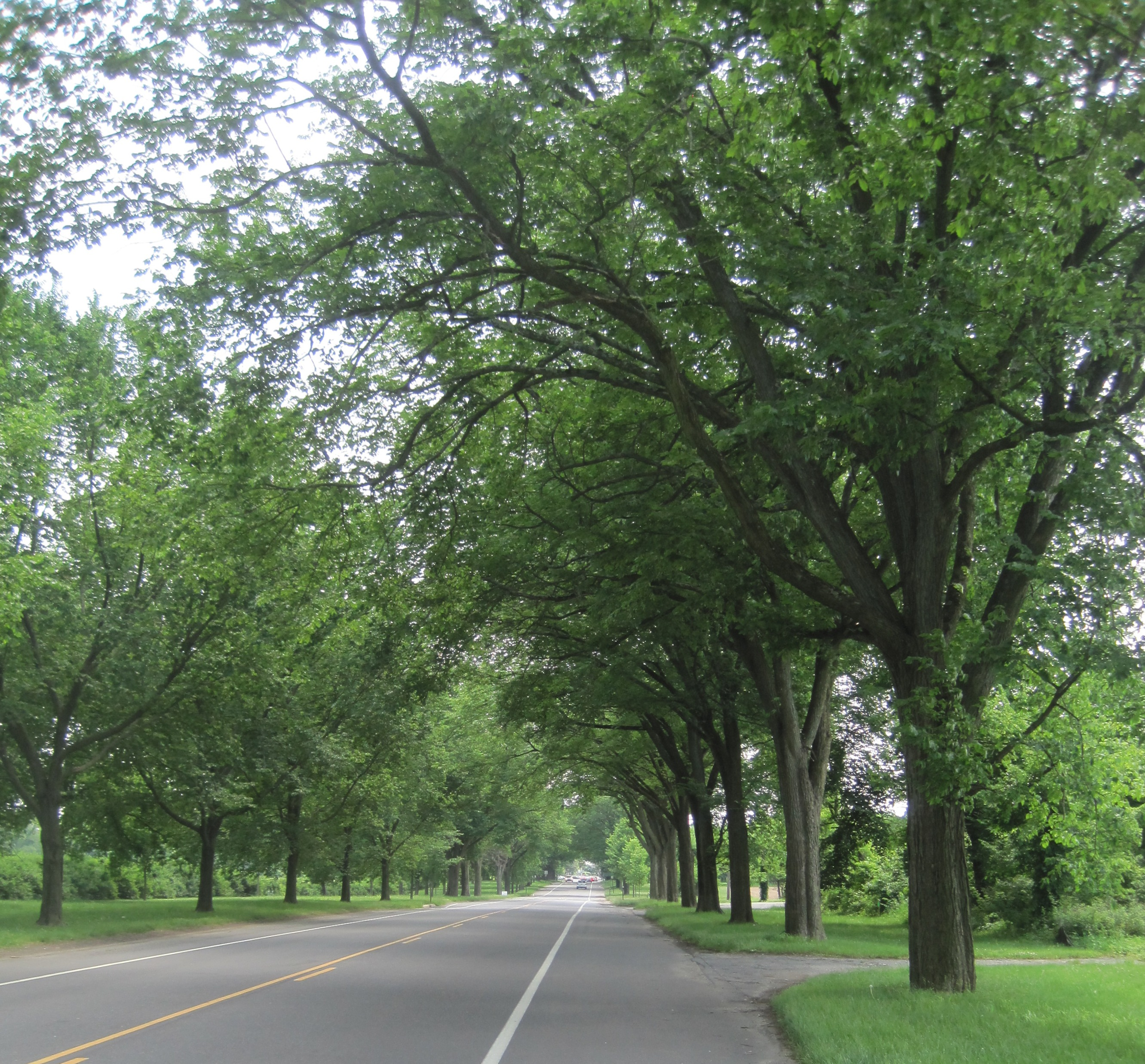

The original allée was planted in the mid-1920s by Princeton Nurseries, at one time the country's largest commercial plant nursery. The Elm trees are of the Princeton variety, developed by Princeton Nurseries for its landscaping quality, and are resistant to Dutch elm disease, the only one of ten resistant cultivars to have trees that have reached maturity. Of the original 136 Elms planted in the 1920s only 76 survive. They are approximately 24–26 inches (610–660 mm) in diameter and 60 feet (18 m) tall. Their branches meet over the roadway to provide a leafy canopy. The allée has many replacement trees, including 16 Norway maples planted in the 1960s, and 31 Liberty elms planted in 1995. The secondary rows of Delaware Elms were planted in 1983, and a long row of forsythia to the east is thought to date from the late 1960s.

=== Schenck-Covenhoven Burial Ground ===
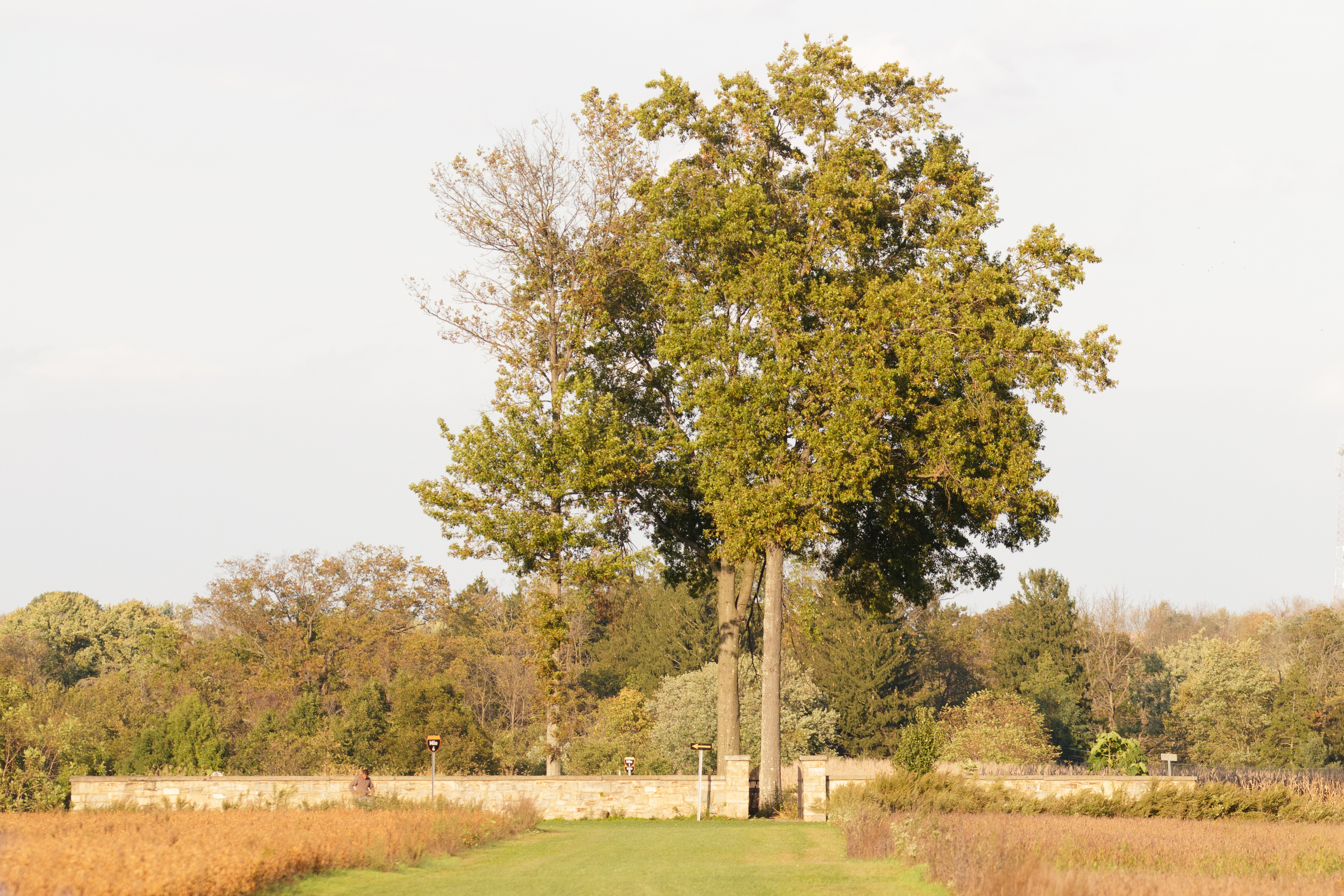
The cemetery, as seen from the Elm Allée

To the east of the Elm Allée, 1,100 feet (340 m) from the road, along the jogging path, can be found the Schenck-Covenhoven Burial Ground, sometimes called the Old Conover Graveyard. It contains eighty to one hundred graves surrounded by a fieldstone stone wall and is undoubtedly the oldest cemetery in West Windsor Township, with burials dating to at least 1746. The Schenck and Covenhoven families were Dutch farmers who purchased over 6,500 acres (2,600 ha) in what is now West Windsor from the sons of William Penn in 1737. The Covenhovens and Schencks were among the original settlers in Penns Neck, a settlement found at the southeast end of the allée. The cemetery has been in disuse since the 1940s, though it receives some maintenance from the university.

==== Gallery ====
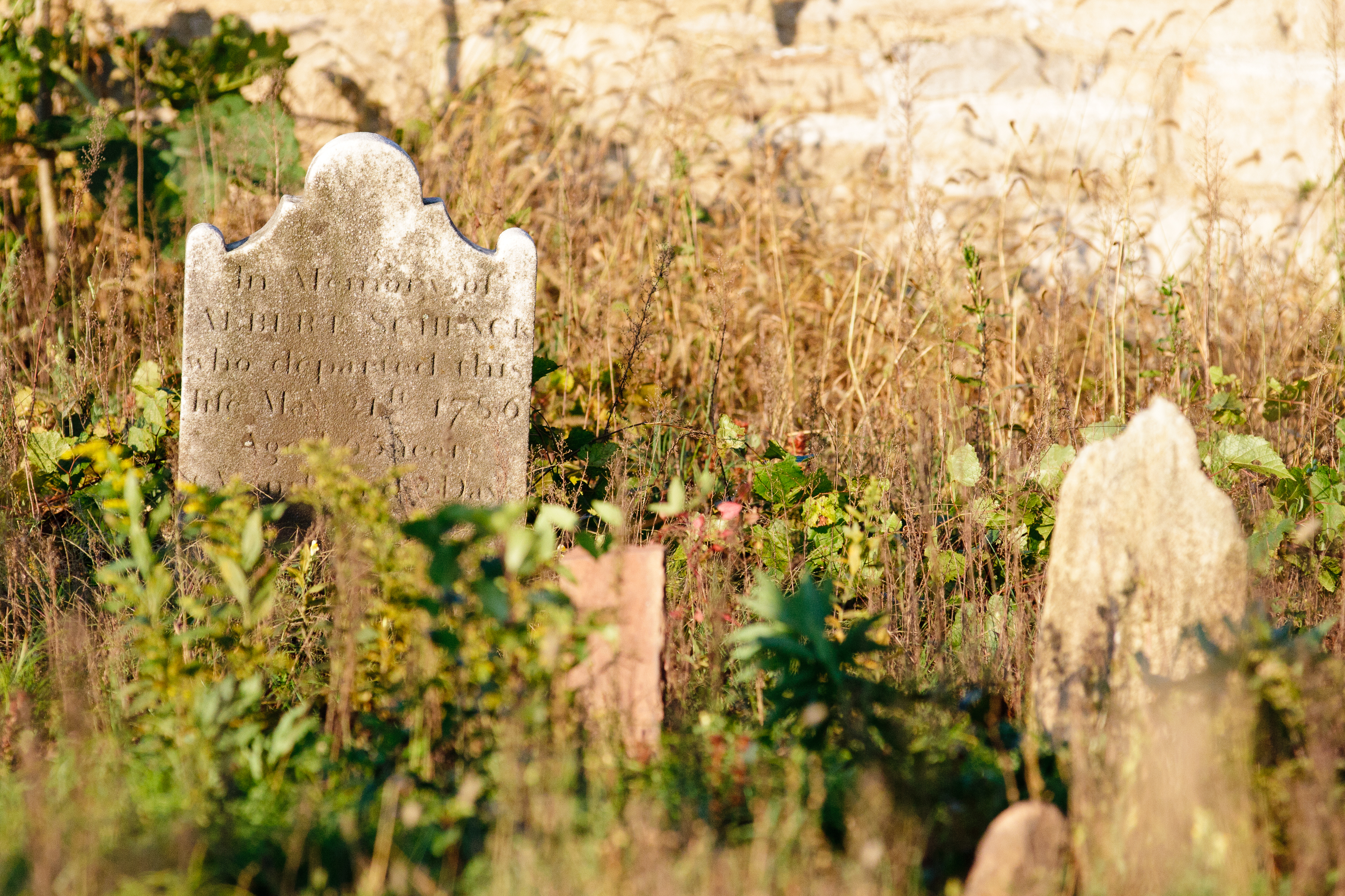
Gravestone of Albert Schenck, died 1786

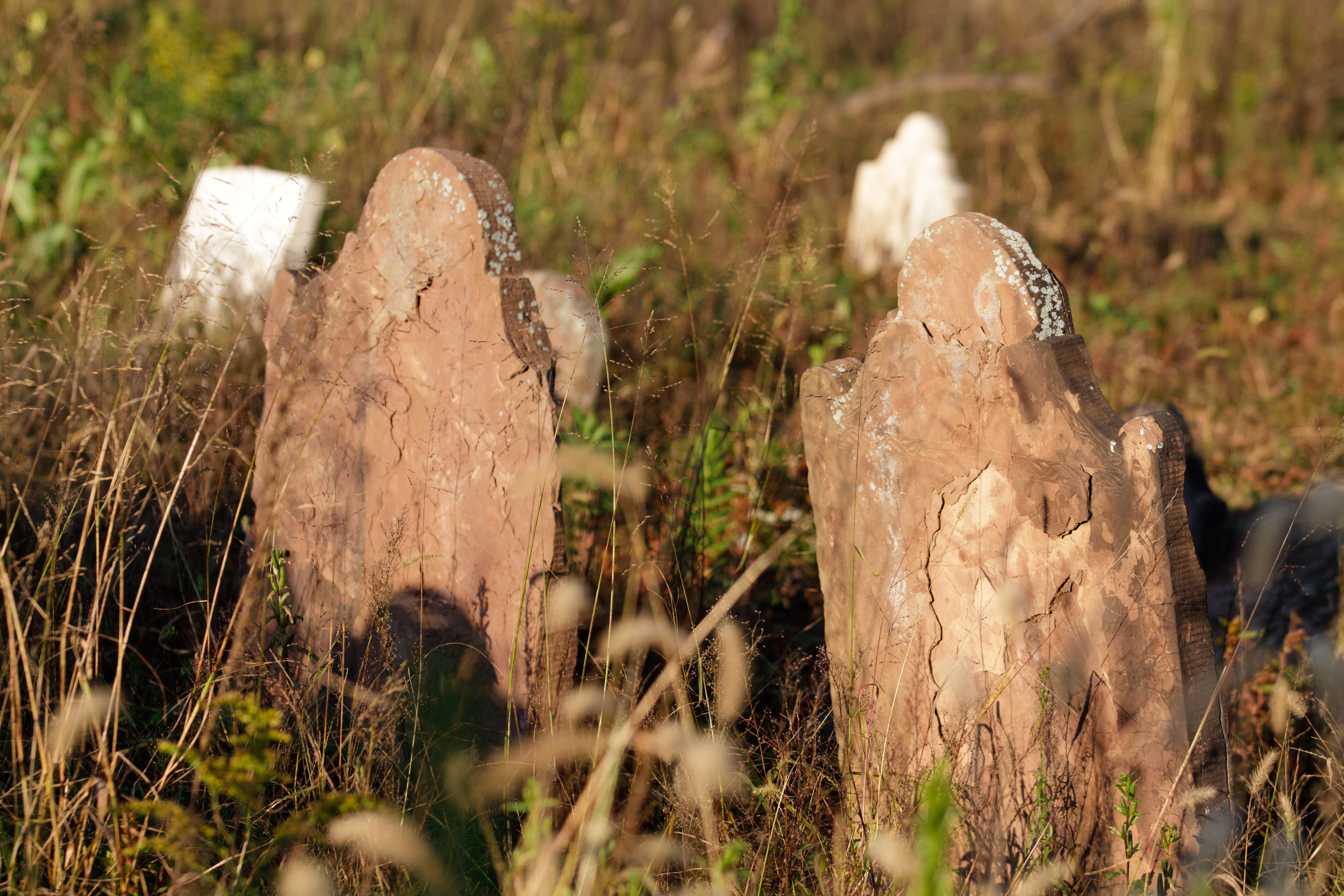
Crumbling gravestones

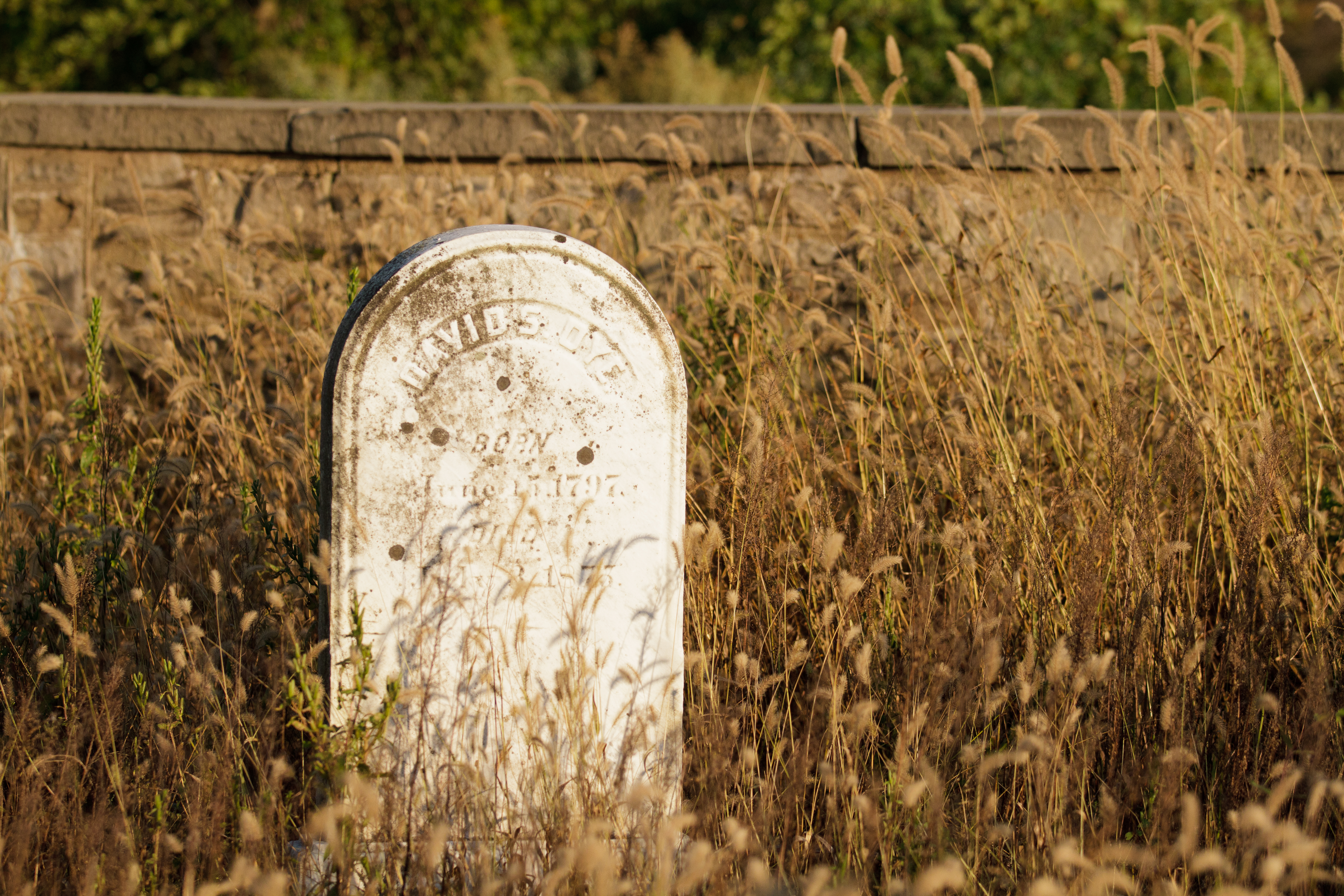
David S. Dye gravestone, died 1875

== See also ==
- National Register of Historic Places listings in Mercer County, New Jersey
