= Ulmus americana 'Lake City' =

Elm cultivar

- Species: Ulmus americana
- Cultivar: 'Lake City'
- Origin: US

The American elm cultivar Ulmus americana 'Lake City' is a semi-fastigiate form cloned in the early 1920s from a ten-year old seedling found growing outside the Lutheran parsonage, Lake City, Minnesota, and released by the Lake City Nurseries there in 1931. The Nurseries published a nine-page booklet on it in 1932, 'The Lake City Elm', with full description, a photograph of the original tree, and commendatory letters. It was later described by Wyman in Trees Magazine 3 (4): 13, 1940.

== Description ==
Closely-branched when young, the tree has an upright habit, wide at the top and narrow at the base. The foliage is dense and dark green. Though slower-growing than 'Moline', another tidy-habited cultivar of American elm, it was sometimes considered more shapely.

== Pests and diseases ==
Minnesota was at first considered too far north to be at serious risk from Dutch elm disease, and heavy losses were not sustained there until the 1970s. Thereafter all the established American elm cultivars in the state proved sususceptible. U. americana is also susceptible to elm yellows; it is moderately preferred for feeding and reproduction by the adult elm leaf beetle Xanthogaleruca luteola; and highly preferred for feeding by the Japanese beetle Popillia japonica. in the United States. U. americana is also the most susceptible of all the elms to verticillium wilt.

== Cultivation ==
'Lake City' was considered more suited to cultivation in northern areas than 'Moline' or 'Vase', as its bark grew rough at a younger age, making it less vulnerable to frost crack and sun scald. Needing no trimming, it was prized for street-planting. Among other nurseries to market it were Cutting's of Byron, Minnesota, Gurney's of Yankton, South Dakota, and J.V. Bailey Nurseries of St Paul, Minnesota, all of which printed photographs of it in their catalogues. The tree is not known to be in cultivation beyond North America.

== Accessions ==
=== North America ===
- Morton Arboretum. One grafted tree, planted along the DuPage river, reputed to be "in good health" in the autumn of 2006. Acc. no. 861-43.
