= Ulmus americana 'Klehmii' =

Elm cultivar

- Species: Ulmus americana
- Cultivar: 'Klehmii'
- Origin: Klehm Nurseries, Arlington Heights, Illinois

The American elm cultivar Ulmus americana 'Klehmii' was cloned from a tree growing at Arlington Heights by Mr Charles Klehm, proprietor of the Charles Klehm & Son nursery. As it is unlikely that Klehms would have released two different vase-shaped American white elm cultivars at the same date (1926), and as nurseries introducing Klehms' 'Vase Elm' always introduced its stablemate 'Moline' at the same time, it is probable that Naperville's 'Klehmii' was the same clone as Klehms' 'Vase'.

== Description ==
'Klehmii' was distinguished by its shapely vase form.

== Cultivation ==
'Klehmii' was marketed from 1929 by the Naperville Nurseries, Naperville, Illinois. It is not known whether it remains in cultivation.

== Synonymy ==
- Ulmus americana 'Klehm': Plant Buyer's Guide, ed. 5, 253, 1949.
