= Ulmus americana 'Delaware' =

Elm cultivar

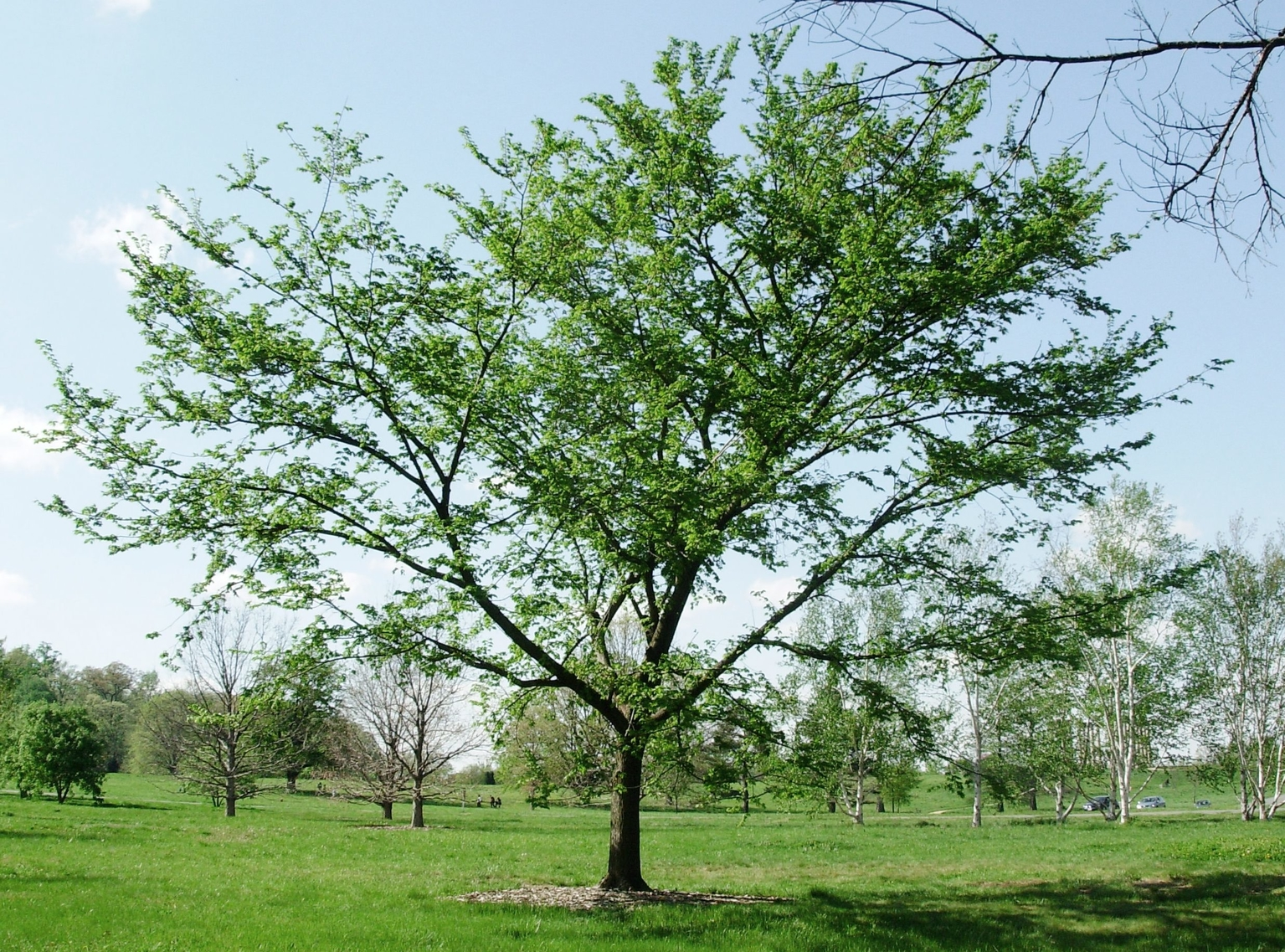
- Delaware Elm, USDA Washington
- Species: Ulmus americana
- Cultivar: 'Delaware'
- Origin: USDA, Morristown, New Jersey, US

The American elm cultivar Ulmus americana 'Delaware' was originally selected (as tree number 218, a c.1940 seedling from North Dakota) from 35,000 seedlings inoculated with the Dutch elm disease fungus in USDA trials at Morristown, New Jersey.

== Description ==
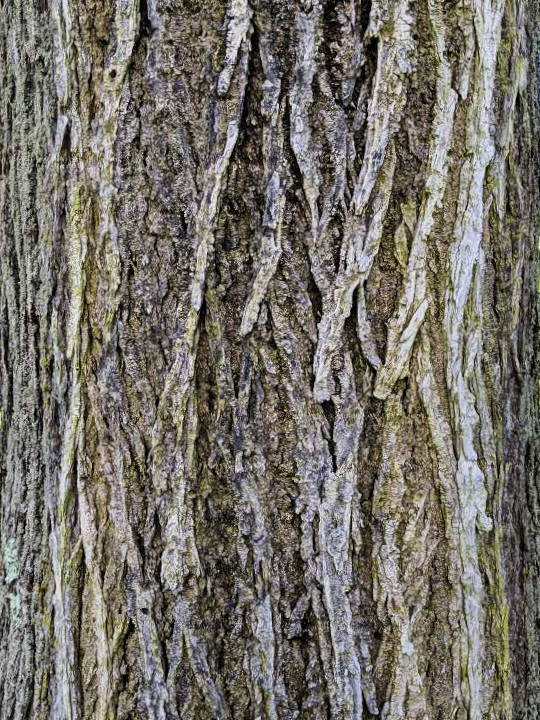
'Delaware' bark

The tree has a relatively low stature and "undesirable" branching habit.

== Pests and diseases ==
Further disease-resistance trials were conducted by both the USDA and the United States National Arboretum which confirmed the clone had a fair level of resistance to Dutch elm disease. 'Delaware' is susceptible to elm yellows, but resistant to the elm leaf beetle Xanthogaleruca luteola.

== Cultivation ==
The original tree, which had been moved to the USDA National Arboretum, Washington, D. C. in 1948, died from unknown causes (probably elm yellows, by some accounts) in 1980, but a clone survives at the Denver Botanic Gardens, as 'Delaware II'. Seven specimens stand in the National Mall area, Washington D.C. Although propagated for further trials, the tree was never commercially released owing to its poor shape. 'Delaware' is not known to have been introduced to Europe or Australasia.

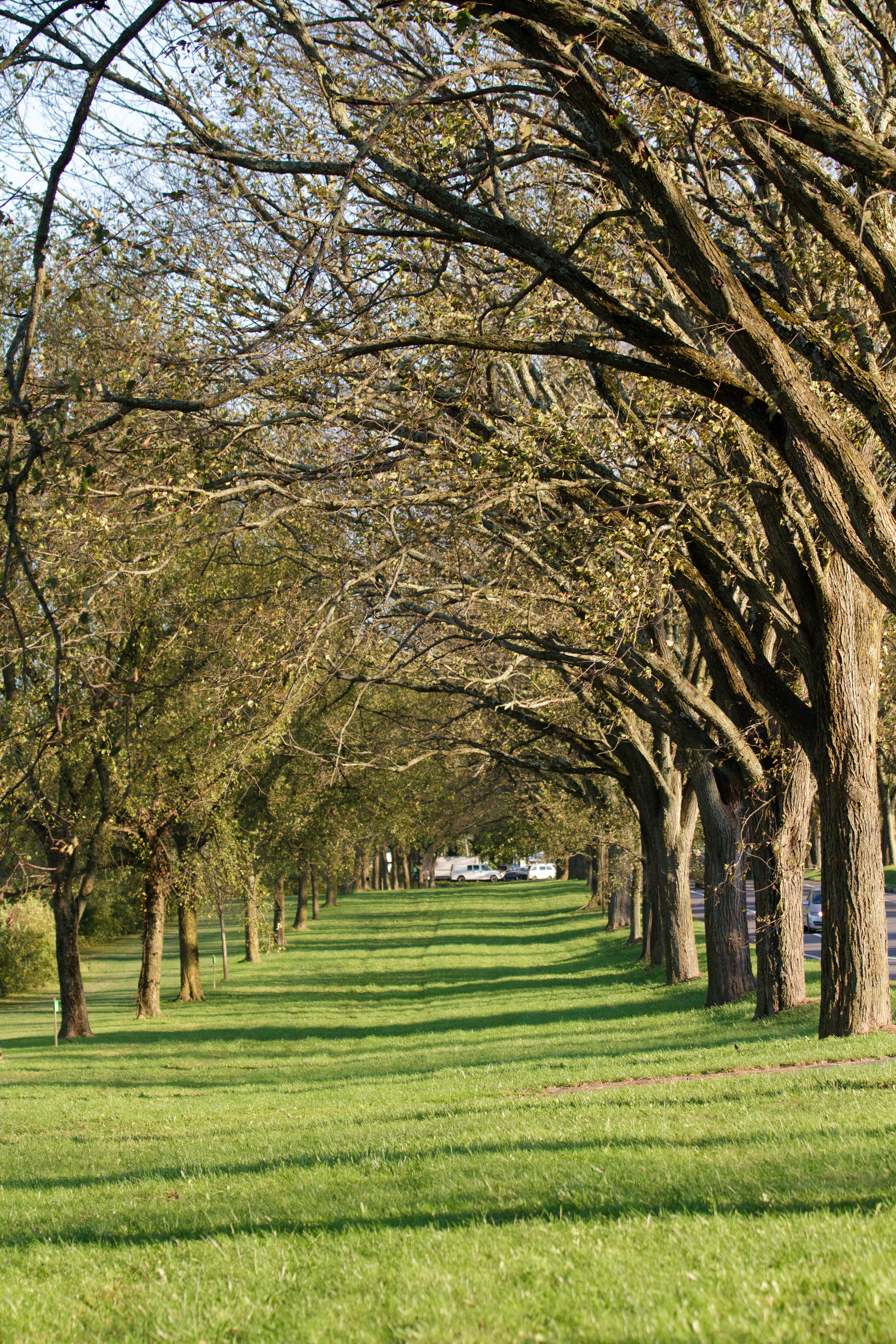
Mature 'Princeton' elms on right, planted 1920s; 'Delaware' on left, planted in 1983, in a side allée of the Washington Road Elm Allée, Princeton, New Jersey, US (2011)

== Synonymy ==
- 'Delaware II'.

NB 'Delaware I' is the original name given to the hybrid 'Urban' before its commercial release.

== Accessions ==
=== North America ===
- Brooklyn Botanic Garden,, New York, US. Acc. no. 980489.
- Dawes Arboretum, US. , Newark, Ohio, US. 1 tree, listed as 'Delaware #2'; no acc. details available.
- Denver Botanic Gardens, US. No details available.
- Dominion Arboretum, Canada.. No details available.
