= Ulmus americana 'Minneapolis Park' =

American elm cultivar

- Species: Ulmus americana
- Cultivar: 'Minneapolis Park'
- Origin: Minneapolis, US

The American elm cultivar Ulmus americana 'Minneapolis Park', originally called 'Minneapolis Park Board Selection', was a cold-hardy clone selected before 1930 by Theodore Wirth, Superintendent of the Minneapolis Park Department, to replace the 'Moline' elms killed in the 1920s by Minneapolis winters.

== Description ==
The tree has a relatively high number of stiff, upright branches creating a broad pyramidal shape.

== Pests and diseases ==
Minnesota was at first considered too far north to be at serious risk from Dutch elm disease, and heavy losses were not sustained there until the 1970s. 'Minneapolis Park' was ultimately found to be very susceptible to the disease.

== Cultivation ==
Propagated by grafting, 'Minneapolis Park' was widely planted in Minneapolis and St Paul, especially as an avenue tree. By 1928 Minnesota winters had claimed most of the 568 'Moline' elms in Victory Memorial Drive in North Minneapolis, commemorating the war dead of Hennepin County; they were replaced with hardier 'Minneapolis Park'. Owing to its susceptibility to disease it is unlikely the tree remains in cultivation.

== Synonymy ==
- 'Minneapolis Park Board Selection': Brand Peony Farms, 1930 Cat.; Faribault, Minnesota; p.16.
- 'Minneapolis Park Board': Sherman Nursery, Charles City, Iowa, Wholesale Cat., Spring 1960.
