= Ulmus americana 'Independence' =

Elm cultivar

- Species: Ulmus americana
- Cultivar: 'Independence'
- Origin: University of Wisconsin–Madison, US

The American elm cultivar Ulmus americana 'Independence' was raised by Eugene B. Smalley and Donald T. Lester at the University of Wisconsin–Madison from a crossing of the American elm cultivar Moline and American elm clone W-185-21, to become one of the six clones forming the American Liberty series, and the only one to be patented (U. S. Plant Patent 6227, 1988).

== Description ==
Almost identical to the species.

== Pests and diseases ==
No specific information available, but the species as a whole is highly susceptible to Dutch elm disease and elm yellows; it is also moderately preferred for feeding and reproduction by the adult elm leaf beetle Xanthogaleruca luteola, and highly preferred for feeding by the Japanese beetle Popillia japonica in the United States. U. americana is also the most susceptible of all the elms to verticillium wilt.

== Cultivation ==
The tree is not known to be in cultivation beyond North America.

== Accessions ==
=== North America ===
- U S National Arboretum , Washington, D.C., United States. Acc. no. 62001
