= Ulmus americana 'Moline' =

Elm cultivar

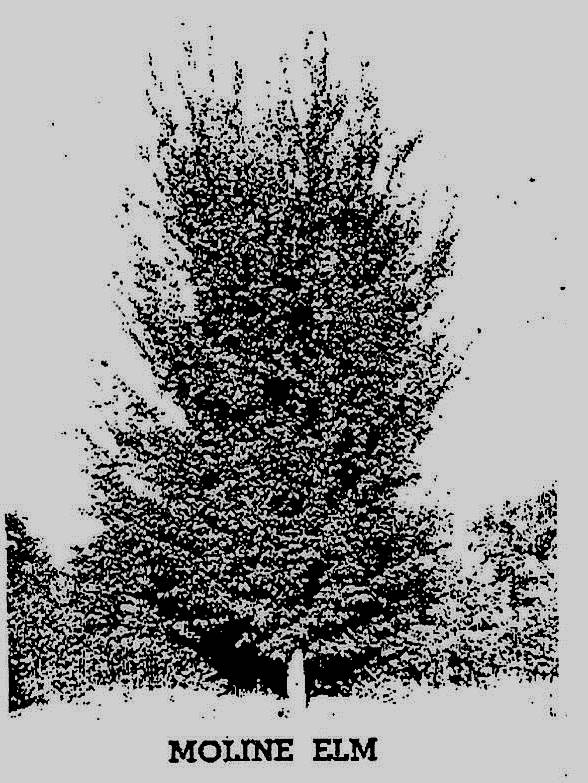
- Juvenile U. americana 'Moline'
- Species: Ulmus americana
- Cultivar: 'Moline'
- Origin: Moline, Illinois, US

The American elm cultivar Ulmus americana 'Moline' was cloned from a wild seedling transplanted to Moline, Illinois, from nearby Rock River Valley in 1903 and propagated from 1916 by the Klehm Nurseries, Arlington Heights, Illinois.

== Description ==
'Moline' is distinguished by its narrow but open form, with a single central trunk likened to a Lombardy Poplar when young, the branches of the older trees being ultimately horizontal. The leaves, of a dark rich shade of green, could be exceptionally broad, measuring 15 cm across.

A photograph captioned 'The Moline elm as it is growing in Moline, Illinois' in the Arnold Arboretum paper 'Elms grown in America' (1951) in fact shows a specimen of the field elm cultivar 'Umbraculifera' in Moline.

== Pests and diseases ==
'Moline' was susceptible to Dutch elm disease. In trials at the Morton Arboretum, Illinois, the tree was eschewed by the elm leaf beetle Xanthogaleruca luteola. No other specific information available, but the species as a whole is highly preferred for feeding by the Japanese beetle Popillia japonica. U. americana is the most susceptible of all the elms to verticillium wilt.

== Cultivation ==
In earlier field trials at Morton, 'Moline' was found to have a relatively fast growth rate, exceeding 7.7 m (25 ft) in height in 10 years. The clone was hardy through Iowa, Illinois, Southern Wisconsin, and Michigan, but was susceptible to frost further north. By 1928 Minnesota winters had claimed most of the 568 'Moline' in Victory Memorial Drive in North Minneapolis, commemorating the war dead of Hennepin County; they were replaced with hardier 'Minneapolis Park'. In Lake City and Duluth, Minnesota, 'Moline' and its stablemate 'Vase' were found to be vulnerable to frost crack and sun scald, and were replaced by the cultivar 'Lake City', the bark of which grew rough at a younger age. 'Moline' was still in cultivation in the 1950s, but was by then considered by Trees Magazine "an inferior type of American elm". It is not known to have been introduced to Europe or Australasia.

== Synonymy ==
- Ulmus americana var. molinensis: Bailey & Bailey, Hortus Second 746, 1941.

== Hybrid cultivars ==
'Moline' was crossed with American elm W-185-21 to create the moderately disease-resistant cultivar 'Independence'.

== Accessions ==
=== North America ===
- Morton Arboretum, US. Acc. no. 1297-27.
