= Princeton Nurseries =

- Princeton Nurseries Historic District
- U.S. National Register of Historic Places
- U.S. Historic district
- New Jersey Register of Historic Places
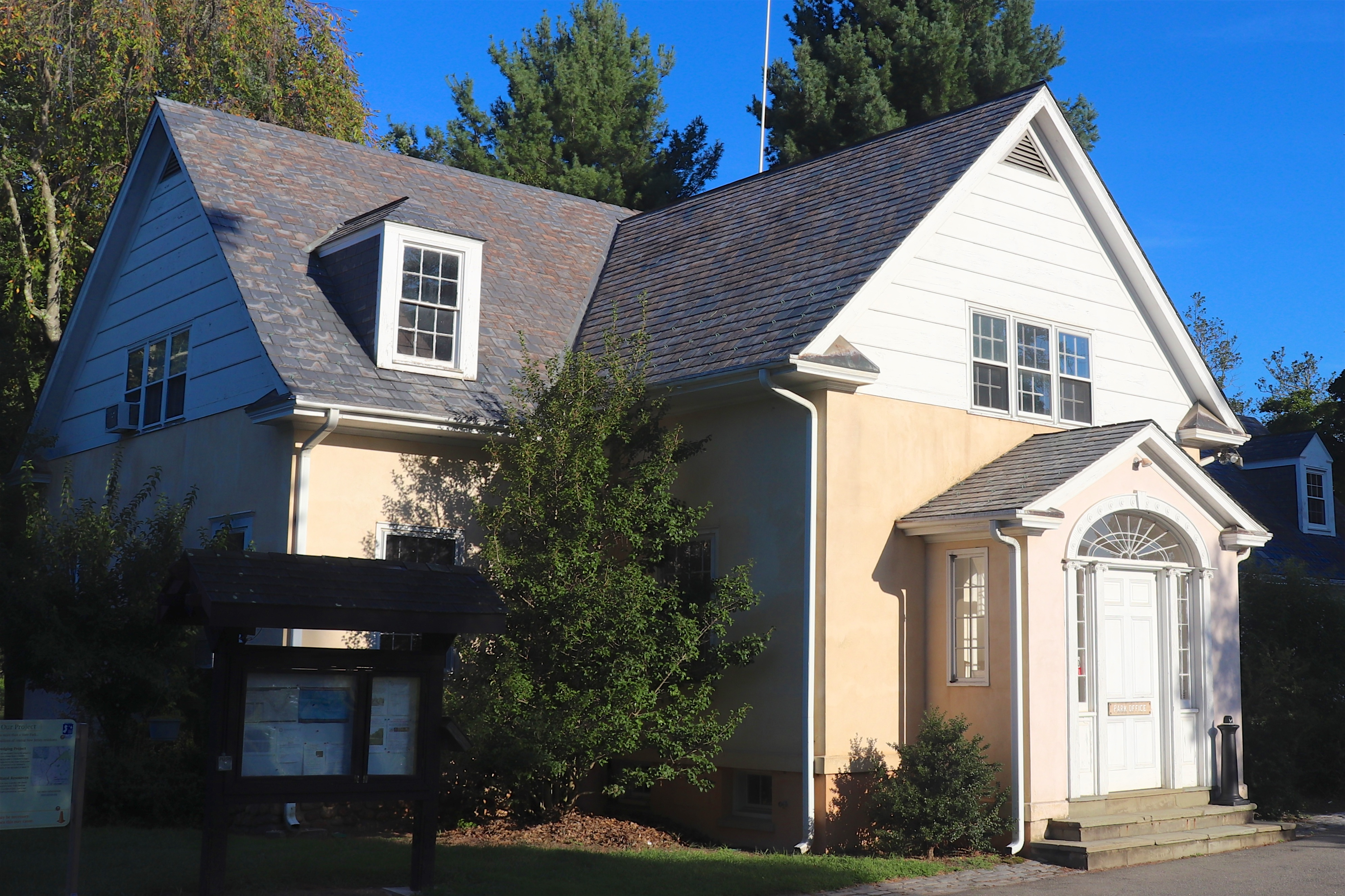
- Princeton Nurseries, Sales and Administration Building, 2018

- Location within Middlesex County, New Jersey Location within New Jersey Location within the United States
- Location: Generally along Mapleton Road and Ridge Road; Plainsboro Township, New Jersey and South Brunswick, New Jersey
- Coordinates: 40°22′07″N 74°36′55″W
- Area: 272 acres (110 ha)
- Built: 1913
- Built by: Rolf W. Bauhan; William Flemer Jr.
- NRHP reference No.: 08000899
- NJRHP No.: 1925

Significant dates
- Added to NRHP: August 28, 2018
- Designated NJRHP: July 22, 2008

Princeton Nurseries was a large commercial plant nursery located near Kingston in the township of South Brunswick, extending into the township of Plainsboro, in Middlesex County, New Jersey, United States. Founded in 1913 by William Flemer Sr., it once was the largest commercial nursery in the United States. The company stopped operations here in 1995. It was added to the National Register of Historic Places as the Princeton Nurseries Historic District on August 28, 2018, for its significance in agriculture and architecture. The 272-acre (110 ha) historic district includes 40 contributing buildings, three contributing structures and one contributing site.

== History and description ==
The Sales and Administration Building, located at 145 Mapleton Road, was built in 1917 and renovated in the 1960s by the architect Rolf W. Bauhan to have Colonial Revival style. It now is the main office of the Delaware and Raritan Canal State Park. The Large Packing Shed, used for storage and shipping, has several sections. The western end was built in 1917 next to the tracks of the Rocky Hill Railroad. The eastern sections were insulated and refrigerated.

== Horticultural introductions ==
- Ulmus americana 'Princeton' – 'Princeton' American Elm

== Gallery ==
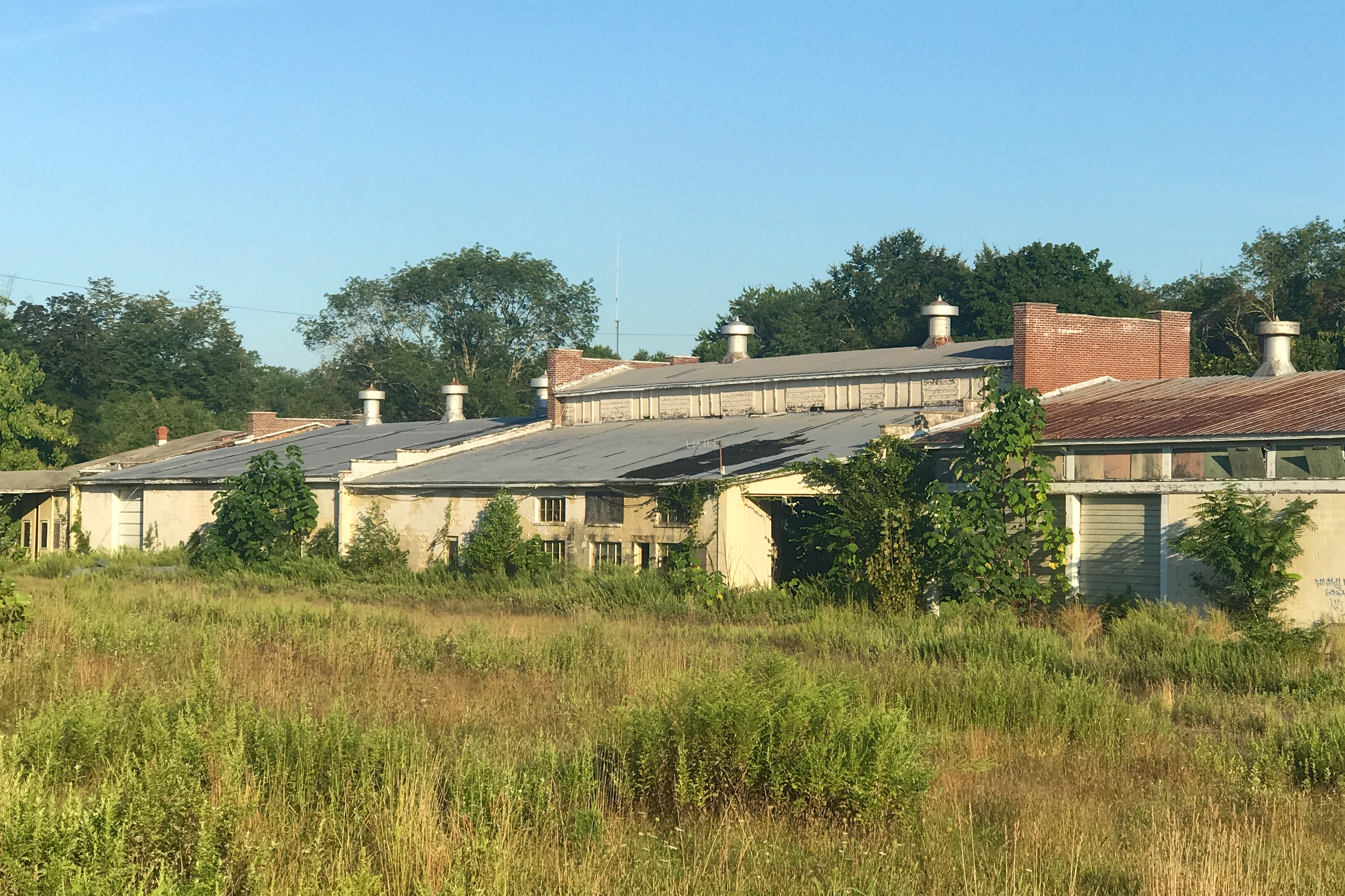
Large Packing Shed

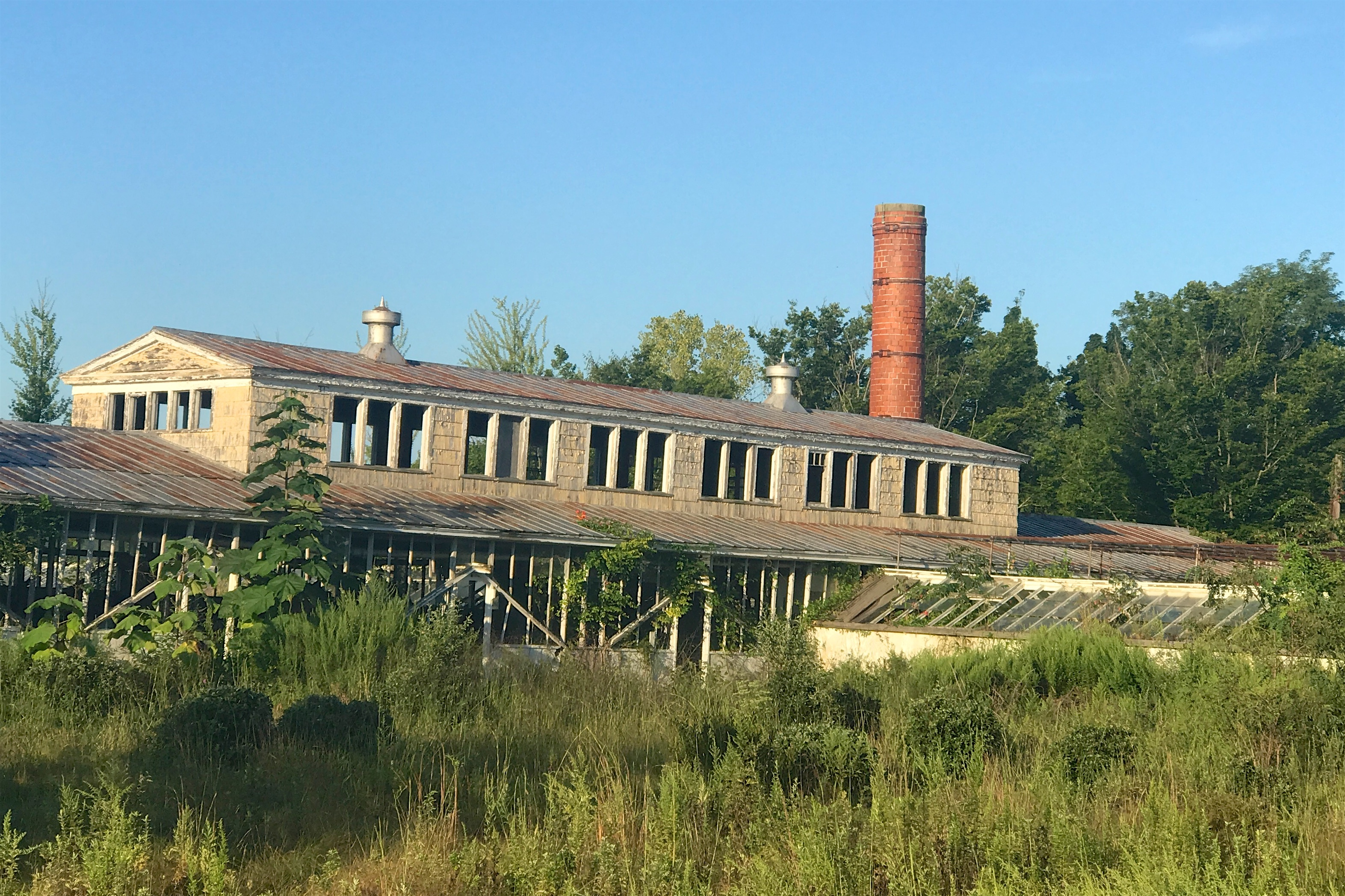
Propagation House

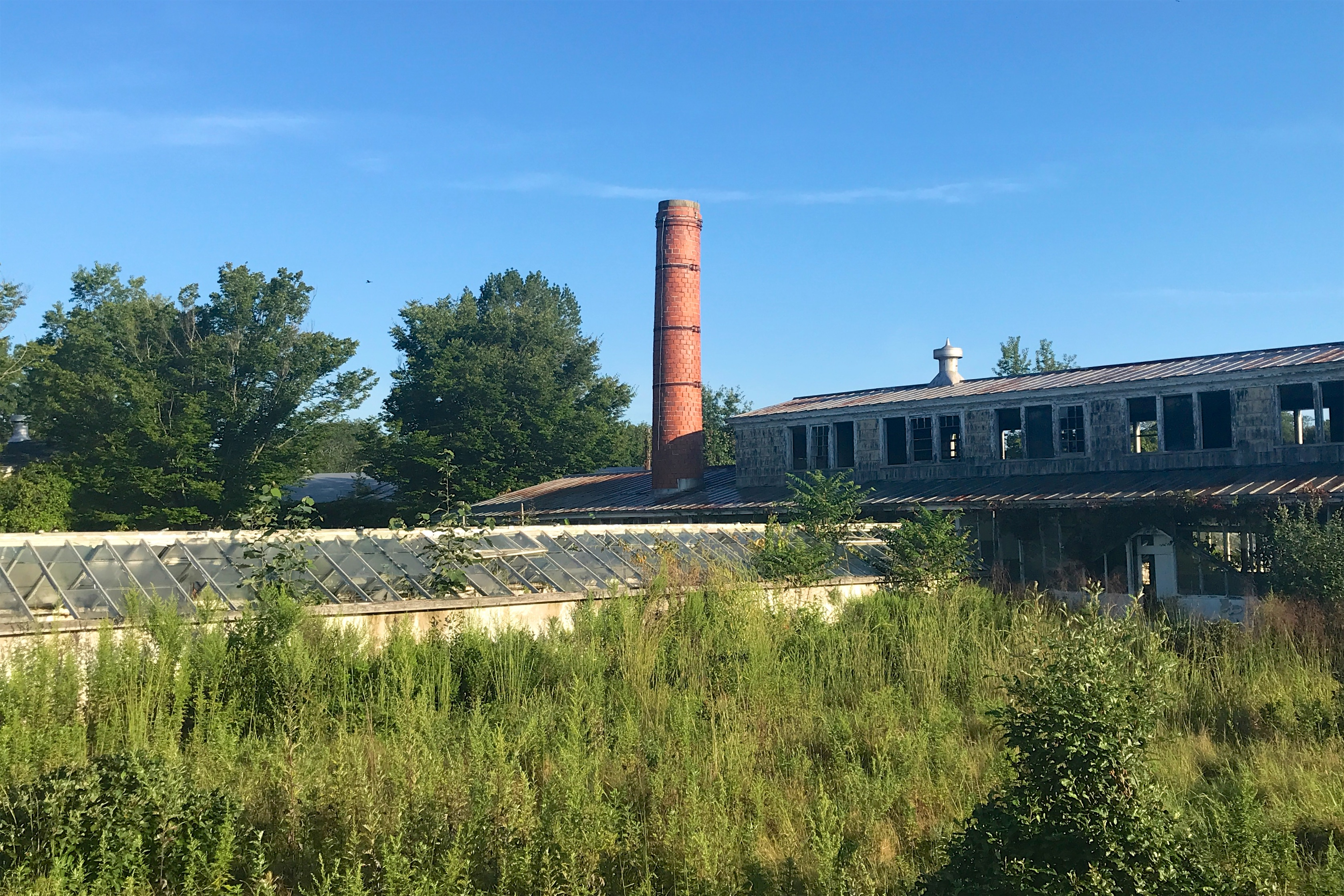
Propagation House and Greenhouse

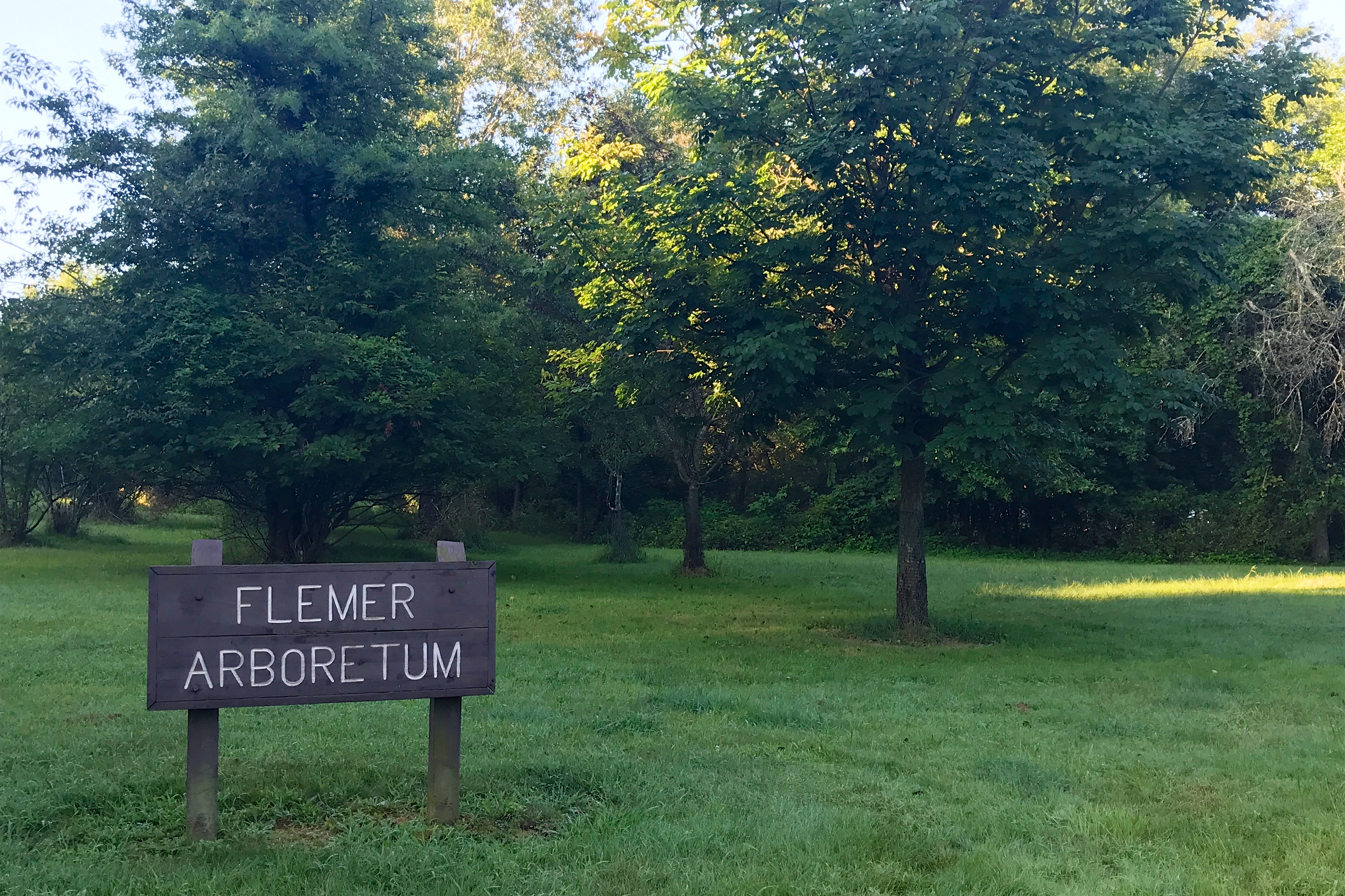
Flemer Arboretum

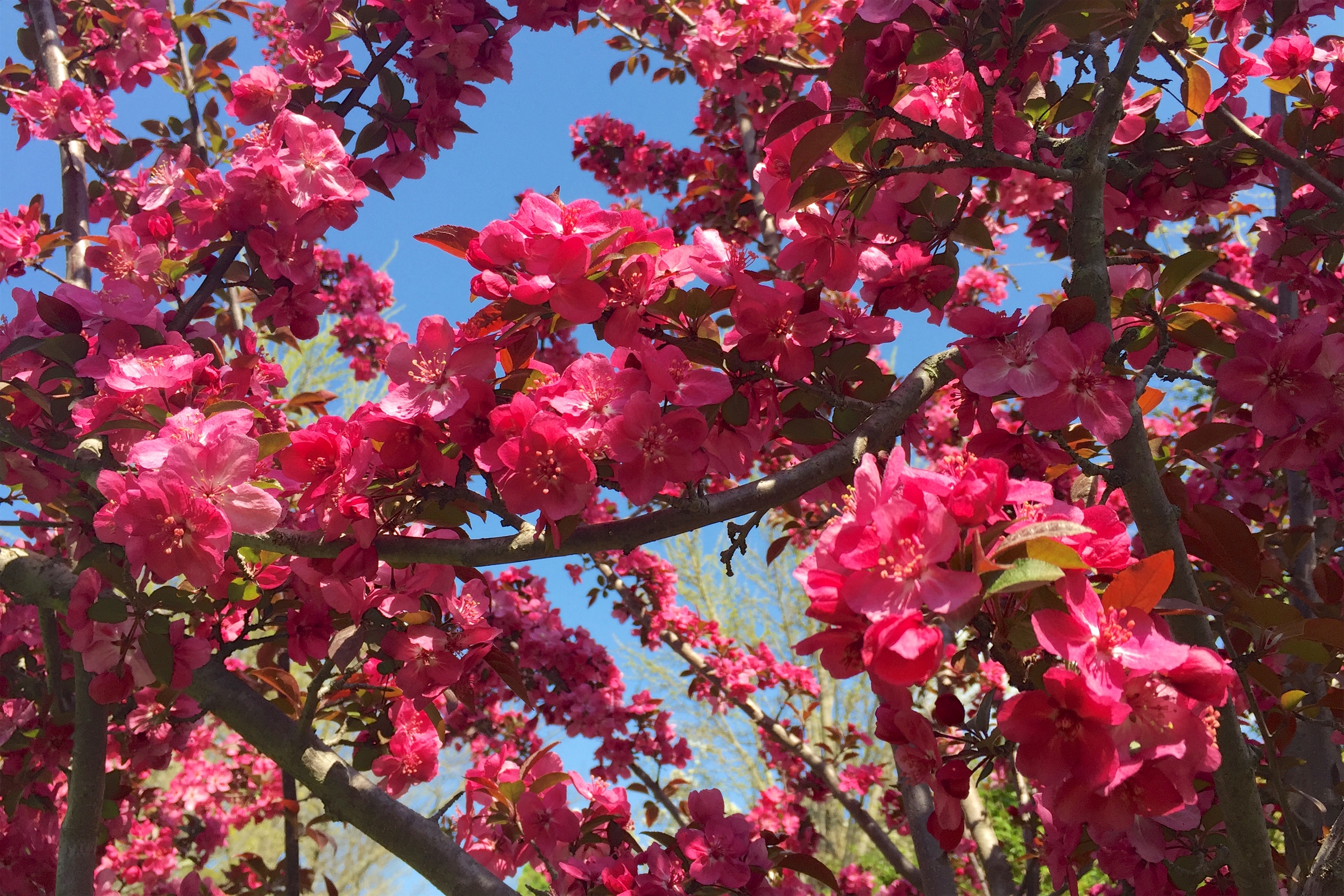
Flowering tree in the arboretum

== See also ==
- National Register of Historic Places listings in Middlesex County, New Jersey
- Washington Road Elm Allée
