= Ulmus × hollandica 'Ademuz' =

Elm cultivar

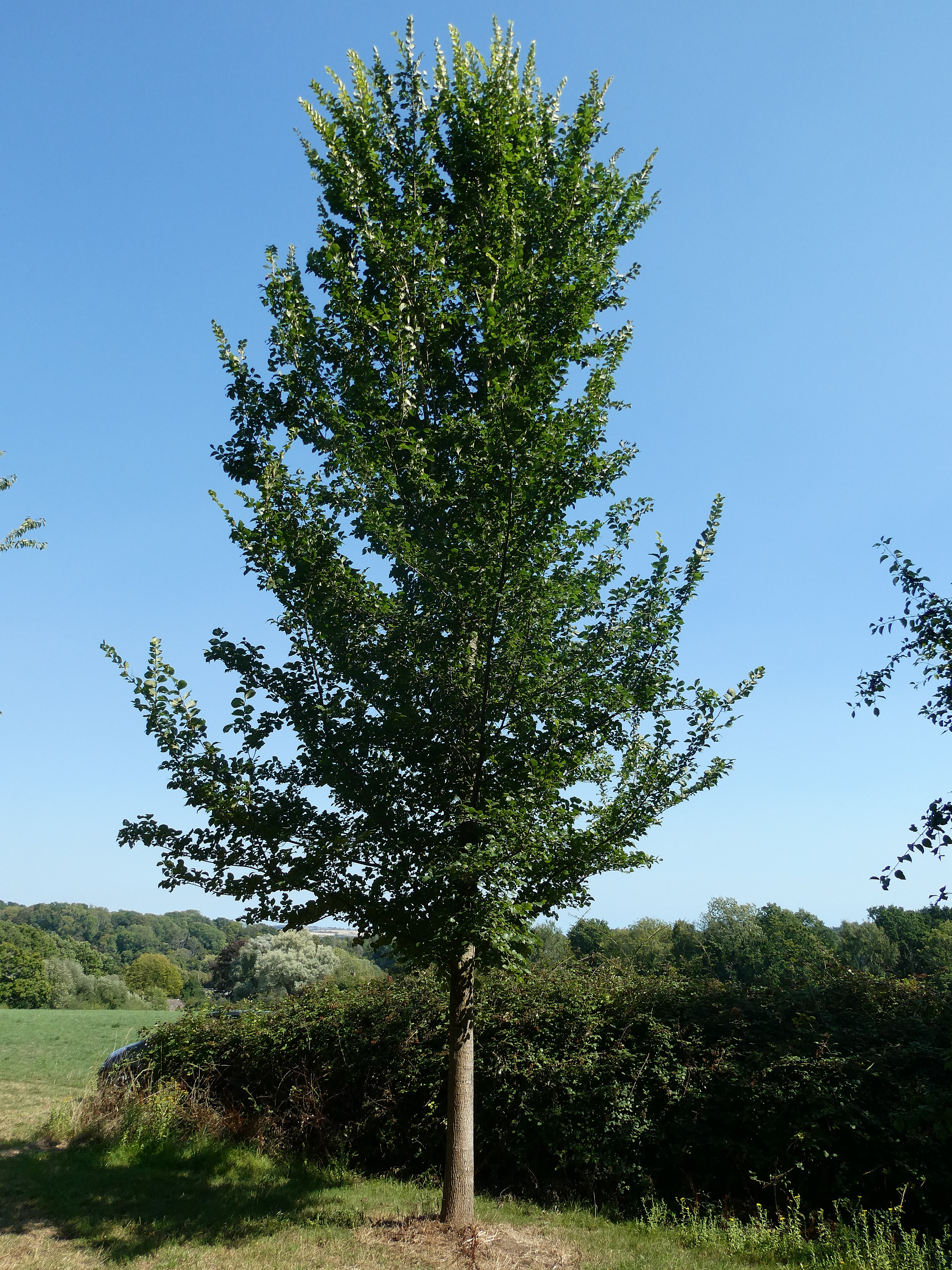
- Ulmus × hollandica 'Ademuz' at Great Fontley, England, 2024.
- Genus: Ulmus
- Hybrid parentage: U. minor × U. glabra
- Cultivar: 'Ademuz'
- Origin: Spain

The cultivar Ulmus × hollandica 'Ademuz' was cloned by root cuttings from an ancient tree discovered in 1996 by Margarita Burón of the Escuela Técnica Superior de Ingenieros de Montes, Universidad Politėcnica de Madrid (UPM). 'Ademuz' has a very high tolerance of Dutch elm disease. In the Madrid study, the appearance of the tree was rated 4.5 / 5, the most attractive of seven cultivars under assessment.

'Ademuz' was introduced to the UK in 2014 by Hampshire & Isle of Wight Branch, Butterfly Conservation as part of an assessment of DED-resistant cultivars as potential hosts of the endangered White-letter Hairstreak. 'Ademuz' was observed hosting the White-letter Hairstreak in Hampshire in 2025.

Propagation of 'Ademuz' is protected by an EU Grant of Rights, given on 02/07/2018 under Grant ref. 49920.

== Description ==
No description of the original tree or its location survives. The clones at Puerta de Hierro, Madrid, grew at an average of 100 cm per annum, the fastest of the seven clones under assessment. The tree is usually monopodial to a height of five metres, its branches devoid of corky tissue. The leaves, on 5 mm petioles, are ovate, typically acuminate at the apex, the average length and width 54 × 34 mm, the margins doubly serrate. Foliar density relative to 'Sapporo Autumn Gold' is described as 'medium'. Leaf bud-burst was in late April in southern England. The samarae are typically 15 mm long by 10 mm broad, the seed central, and the notch distinctively circular; they are shed in late April in southern England. Specimens grown in southern England attained sexual maturity aged eight years, commencing flowering in late February (week 8).

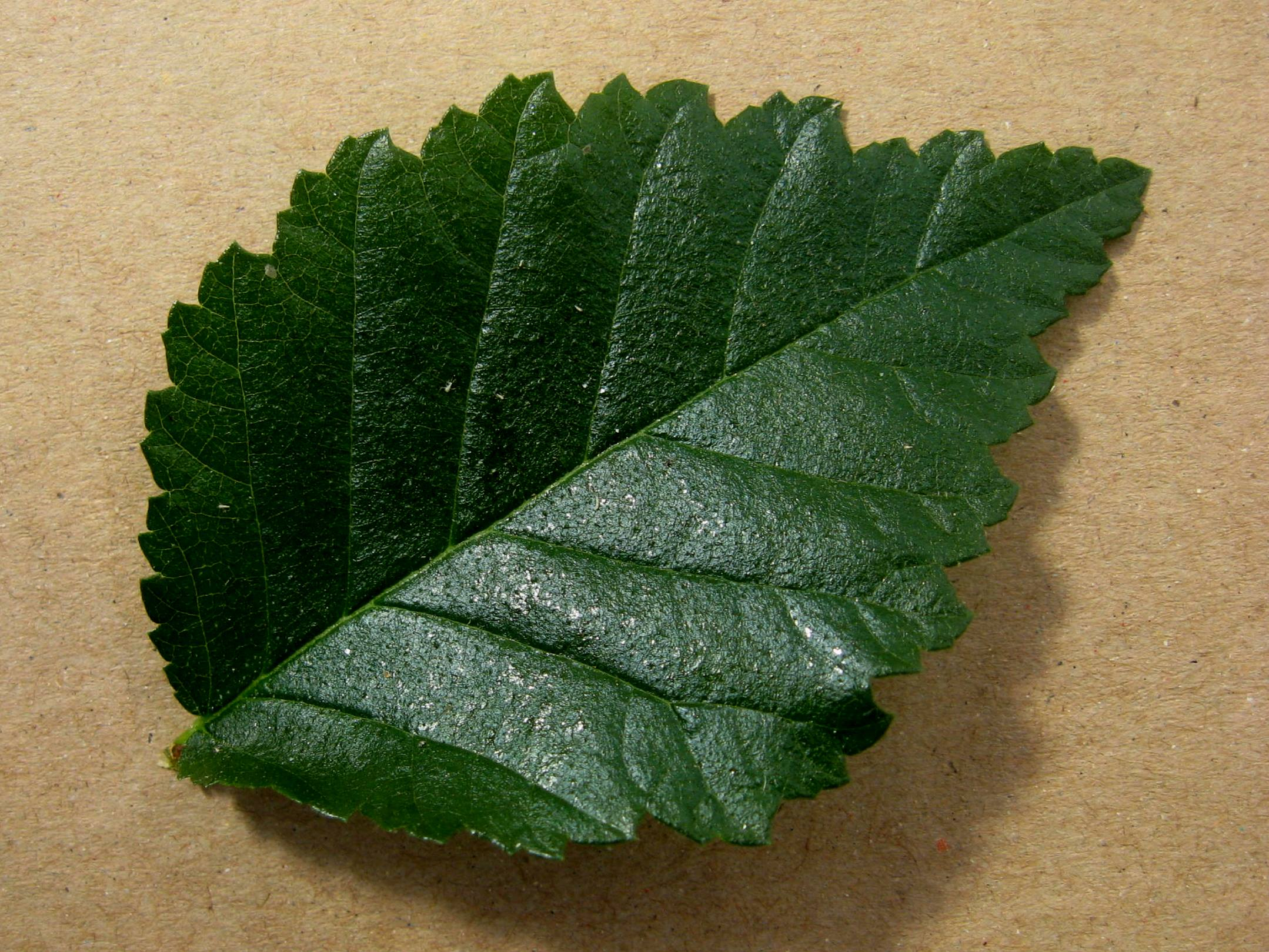
Leaf

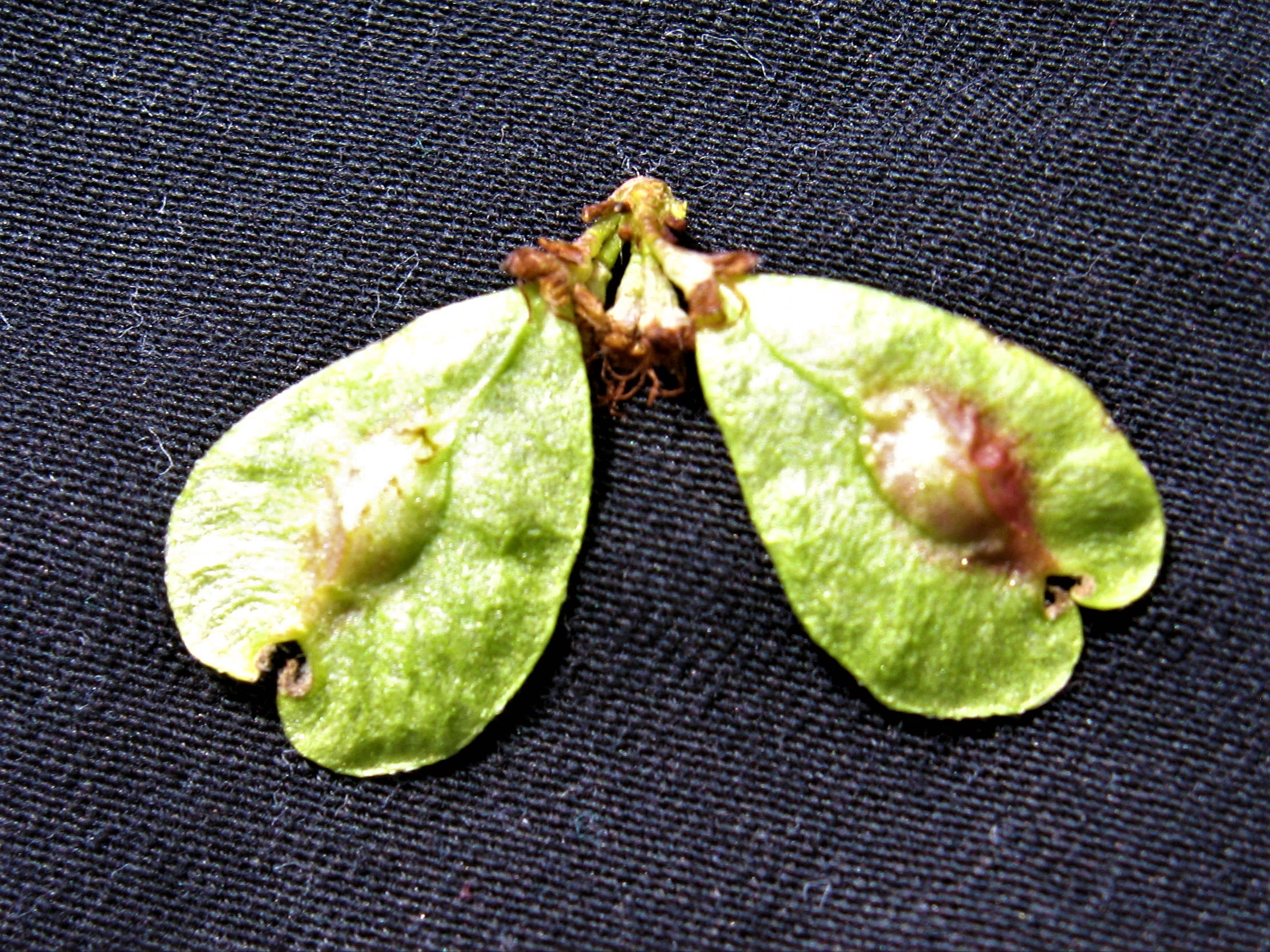
Samarae

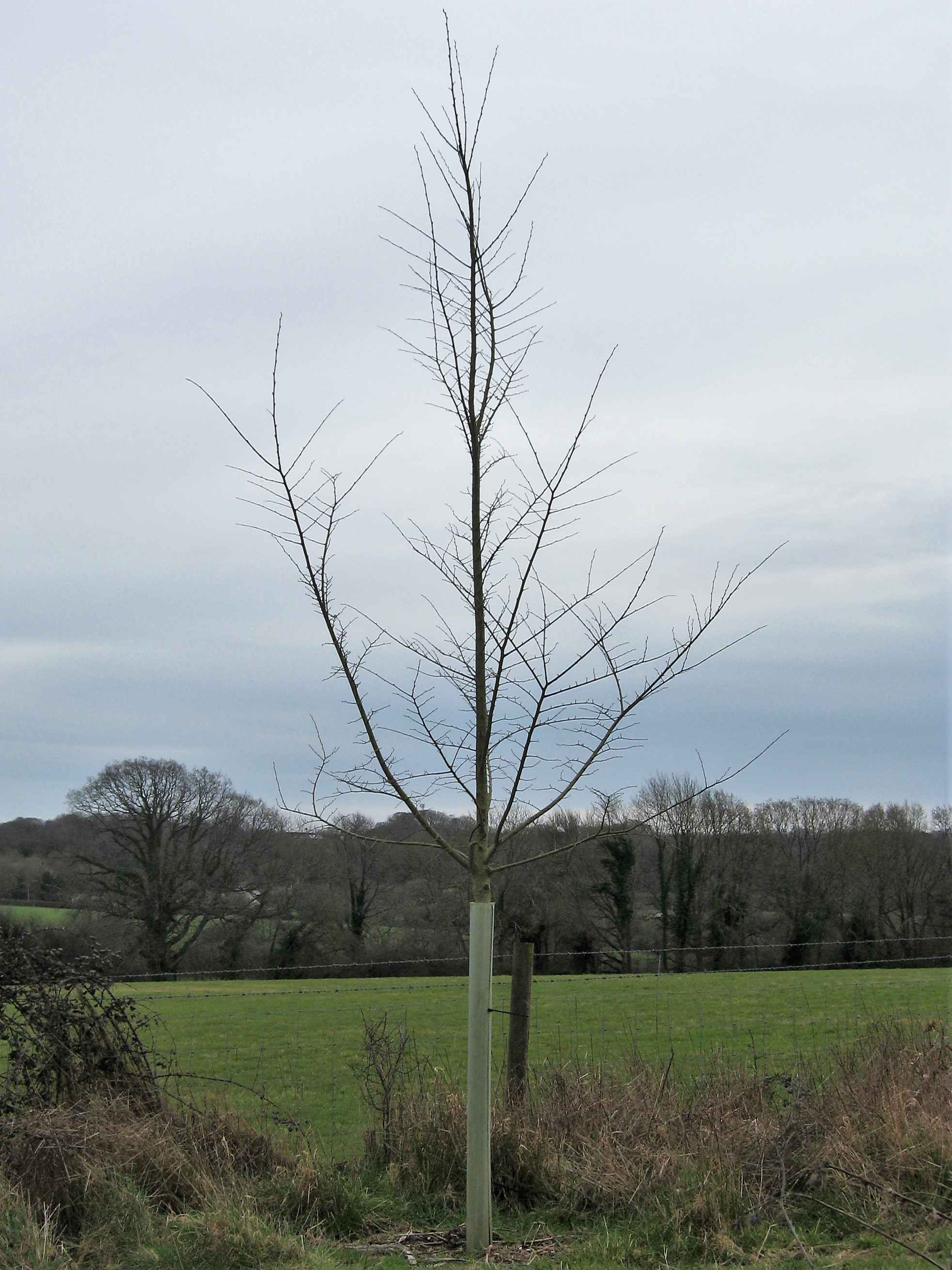
Erect structure of untrained sapling

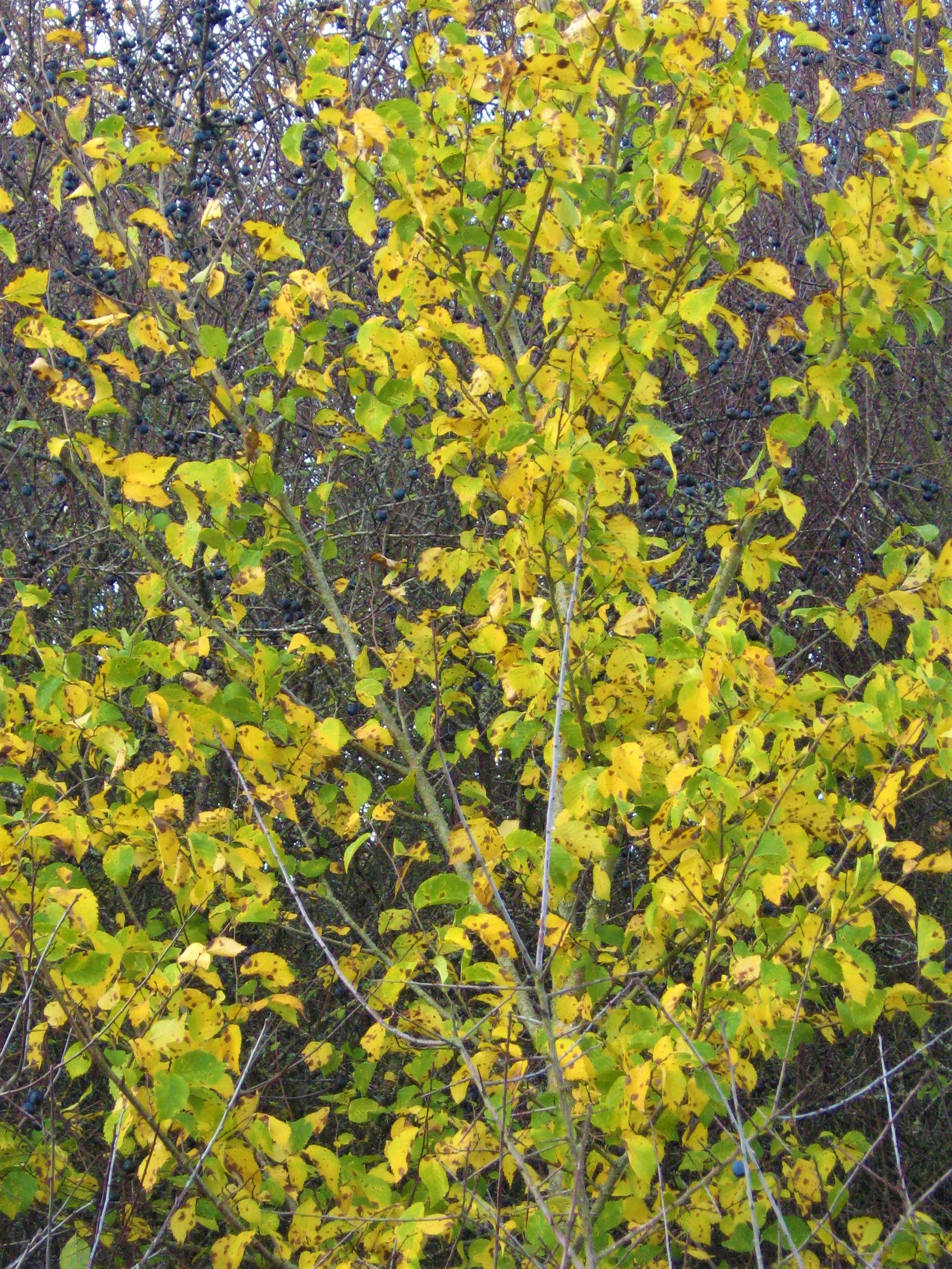
Autumn colour

== Pests and diseases ==
Inoculated with the pathogen Ophiostoma novo-ulmi in trials conducted in 2008, 'Ademuz' sustained approximately 10% damage (assumed to be wilting rather than die-back) against a score of c. 45% for the benchmark-resistant cultivar 'Sapporo Autumn Gold'. In 2009 'Ademuz' scored c. 18%, and Sapporo c. 21%. Ergo, 'Ademuz' would appear to have a level of tolerance of Dutch elm disease unprecedented in a European elm. 'Ademuz' has not been tested for resistance to elm yellows (elm phloem necrosis).

== Cultivation ==
The location of the parent tree is not known but has been wrongly assumed to be in or near the eponymous town in the province of Valencia. 'Ademuz' has been widely planted in England since 2014, notably thriving at five sites in Hampshire, as part of Butterfly Conservation's elm trials, where the rainfall is approximately double the Madrid total, and geology ranges from chalk to impermeable clays. 'Ademuz' has proven particularly resilient where exposed to sea winds, notably where grown on Horsea Island in Portsmouth Harbour, Hampshire. The tree was also selected for planting in the grounds of Highgrove House, but later removed for reasons unknown. Among urban plantings in the UK are three specimens, planted in 2016, at the east end of Broad Walk, Christ Church Meadow, Oxford. In Gloucestershire, 30 were planted in the gardens and estate of Icomb Place in 2023.

== Etymology ==
'Ademuz' (Valencian 'Ademus') is derived from the Arabic 'Ad-damus', which appears to mean 'impregnable', itself derived from the Greek αδαμαντ, the origin of the English words 'adamant' and 'diamond'.

== Accessions ==
=== Europe ===
- Grange Farm Arboretum, Lincolnshire, UK. Acc. no. 1131. One small whip planted 2015.
- Great Fontley Farm, Hampshire, UK. Butterfly Conservation elm trial plantation. Eight trees planted 2014–2024.
- Royal Botanic Garden Edinburgh, UK. Acc. no. 20180335
- Royal Botanic Gardens, Kew, UK. Acc. no. not known.
- Sir Harold Hillier Gardens, Hampshire, UK. Ampfield Wood. Acc. no. 2017.0197.

== Nurseries ==
=== Europe ===
- Shallcross, Wallmead Farm, Tisbury, Wiltshire, UK.
