= Ulmus americana 'Vase' =

Elm cultivar

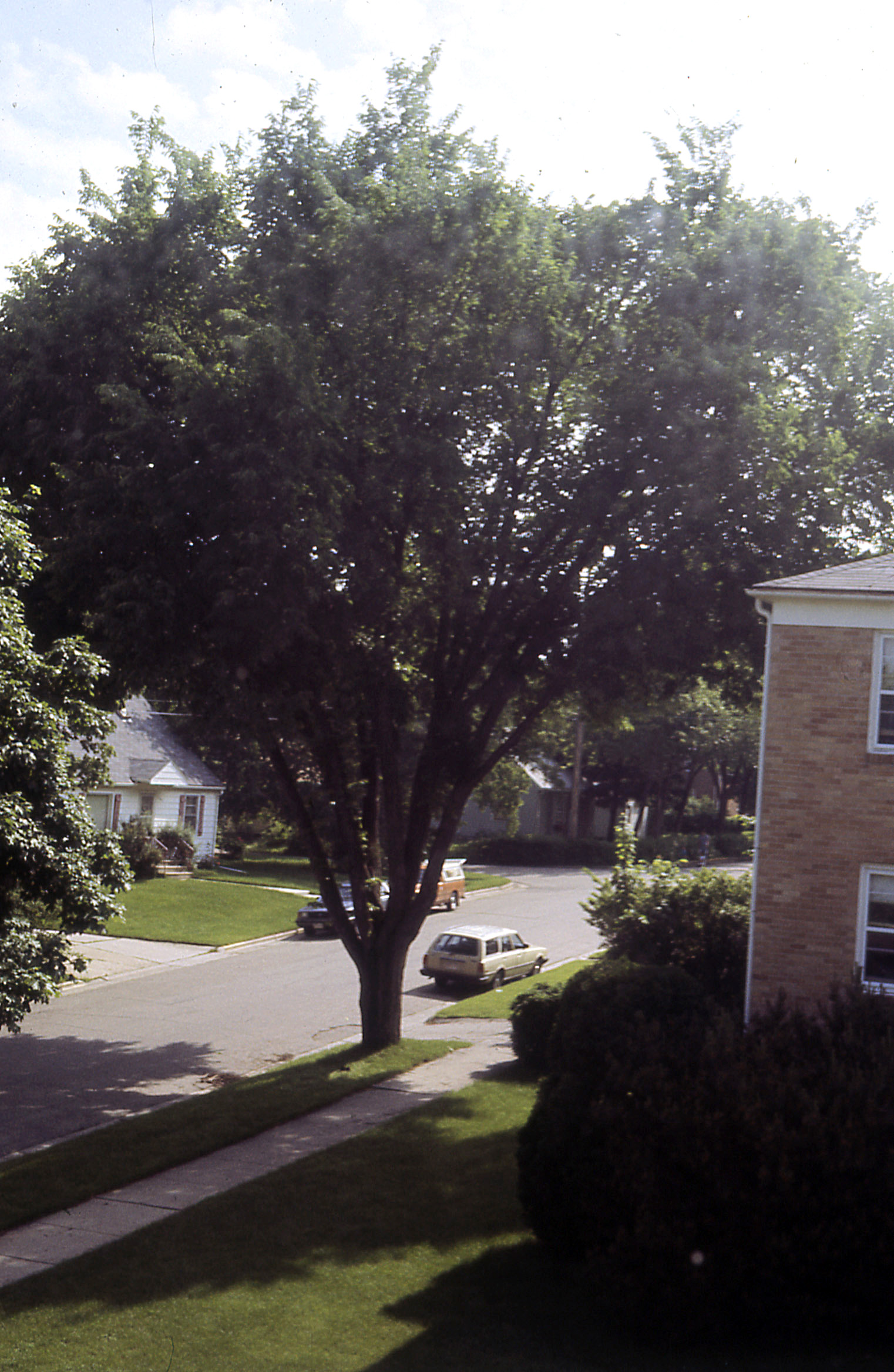
- 'Vase' in Madison, Wisconsin, 1987
- Species: Ulmus americana
- Cultivar: 'Vase'
- Origin: Illinois, US

The American elm cultivar Ulmus americana 'Vase' was selected and propagated in the early 20th century by the Klehm Nurseries, Arlington Heights, Illinois, who advertised it at first as Ulmus americana 'Urnii', 'Klehms' American Vase-Shaped Elm', listing it, along with its stablemate Ulmus americana 'Moline', as a "novelty" in 1926, and describing both in some detail. Its original cultivar name, 'Urnii' – doubtful Latin – was changed to 'Vase' by Klehms by the 1930s, the tree also featuring as 'Vase Elm' ("a budded form of Elm, with graceful vase shape") in the catalogues of the Plumfield Nurseries, Fremont, Nebraska, from 1926, along with Klehms' 'Moline'. Vaughan's of Chicago marketed both from 1927. The Naperville Nurseries of Naperville, Illinois, marketed it from 1929 as 'Klehmii', 'Vase Elm', also introducing Klehms' 'Moline' at the same time.

Green, unaware of its origin, regarded the tree as "neither clonal nor a true cultivar".

== Description ==
An elm of regular spreading upright growth, the top much broader than the center, with density and breadth where the head begins. The foliage is large and deep green, the leaves coming out early and holding late without becoming rusty. The bark in young specimens is dark and smooth, becoming more rugged as the tree grows older. "The tree silhouetted against a clear sky shows distinctly the outline of a giant vase in all its graceful curves. The rapidity of growth is only equalled by Moline Elm."

== Pests and diseases ==
The clone was susceptible to Dutch elm disease, the extensive Milwaukee plantings (see 'Cultivation') succumbing in the mid-1960s.

== Cultivation ==
Buds from the source tree were grafted by Klehms on selected stocks to secure uniformity. 'Vase' was used extensively for street plantings, with over 10,000 planted by 1928 on the streets and boulevards of Milwaukee, Wisconsin.

Other stockists marketing 'Vase' and 'Moline' from the 1920s included the Hamburg Nurseries of Hamburg, Iowa. 'Vase' was listed in Edition 5 of the 1949 Plant Buyers Guide. It is not known whether 'Vase' remains in cultivation in the United States, nor whether it was cultivated elsewhere.

== Notable trees ==
A large surviving American white elm (bole girth 17 ft) by the highway between Milwaukee and Madison matches 'Vase' in description and may be a survivor the Klehm Nurseries' extensive 1920s plantings of this cultivar in the area.

== Synonymy ==
- Ulmus americana 'Klehmii': Naperville Nurseries, Illinois, 1930.
- Ulmus urnii: Siebenthaler Co.,(Dayton, Ohio), Catalogue 122, p. 15, 1931.
- Ulmus vaseyi: Bailey & Bailey, Hortus Second, 747, 1941.
