= Ulmus americana 'American Liberty' =

Elm cultivar

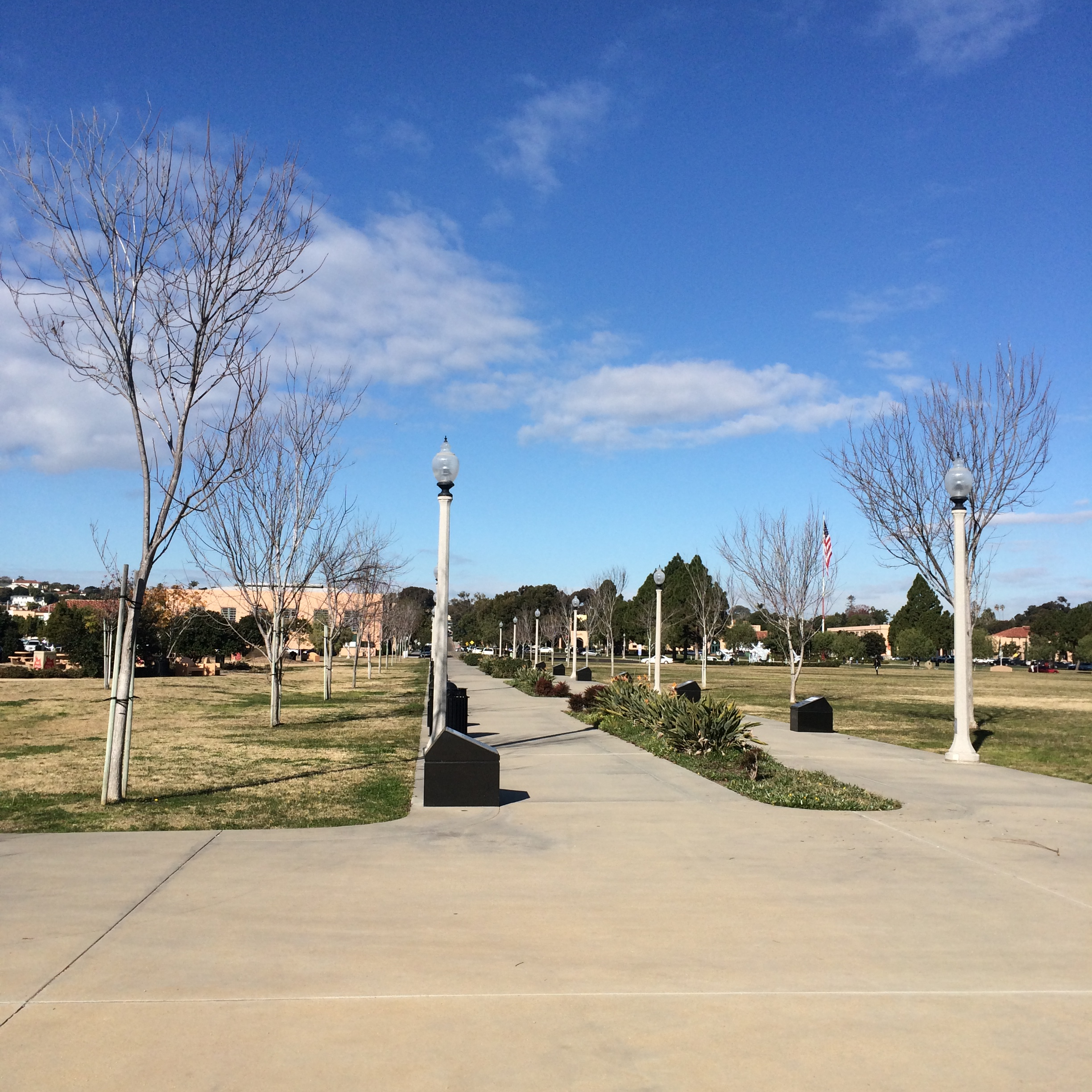
- 'Liberty' elms, WWII Submarine Veterans Memorial, San Diego (2015)
- Species: Ulmus americana
- Cultivar: 'American Liberty'
- Origin: ERI, US

The American elm cultivar Ulmus americana 'American Liberty' is a group of six genetically distinct cultivars under a single name, although they are superficially similar. The Liberty elm is reportedly suitable for street planting, being tolerant of de-icing salts and air pollution. However, examples included in 10-year trials at Atherton, California to evaluate replacements for Californian elms lost to disease did not perform well. The late Professor Eugene Smalley summarized 'American Liberty' as "not as resistant as the Asian hybrids, but it still has the look of a classic American Elm".

== Description ==
Generally similar to the species.

== Pests and diseases ==
The six clones which comprise this series vary considerably in their level of resistance to Dutch elm disease, and none is immune, but some evidence suggests that at least one of the six clones may have a fairly high degree of DED-resistance. It is claimed, controversially, by ERI that fewer than 180 American Liberty elm trees have been known to succumb to DED since the planting began in the early 1980s. This figure is surprising in the light of Townsend & Douglass's work, which found that the Liberty elms exhibited only an 18% survival rate four years after inoculation, compared with 96% for both 'Valley Forge' and 'Princeton', and 100% for the Japanese elm clone 'Prospector'.

The 'American Liberty' elms also sustained wind damage in winter, and high levels of injury from the elm leaf beetle Xanthogaleruca luteola. Accordingly, the cultivar was deemed "highly questionable as a replacement". Moreover, the trees were noted as highly susceptible to elm yellows in New York. Examples tested by research scientists at the United States National Arboretum in the 1992–1993 also failed to perform well , but it has never been clear which of the six clones were represented in the tests, so the results remain largely inconclusive.

== Cultivation ==
Promoted exclusively by the Elm Research Institute (ERI) since 1983, these trees have been planted across the United States in numbers the organization claims to be in excess of 250,000. The American Liberty elm is reputedly "extremely expensive" to buy, particularly in the larger sizes. The tree is not known to have been introduced to Europe or Australasia.

== Accessions ==
=== North America ===
- Brooklyn Botanic Garden, New York, US. Acc. no. 890269.
- Dawes Arboretum, US. , Newark, Ohio, US. 2 trees, no acc. details available.
- Dominion Arboretum, Canada. No details available.
- Holden Arboretum, US. Two trees > 13 m in height (2006). Acc. no. 84-336.
- Mount Holyoke College Botanic Garden, South Hadley, Massachusetts. Acc. no. E00330-1.
- Scott Arboretum, US. Acc. no. 84-276.
