= Ulmus americana 'Princeton' =

American elm cultivar

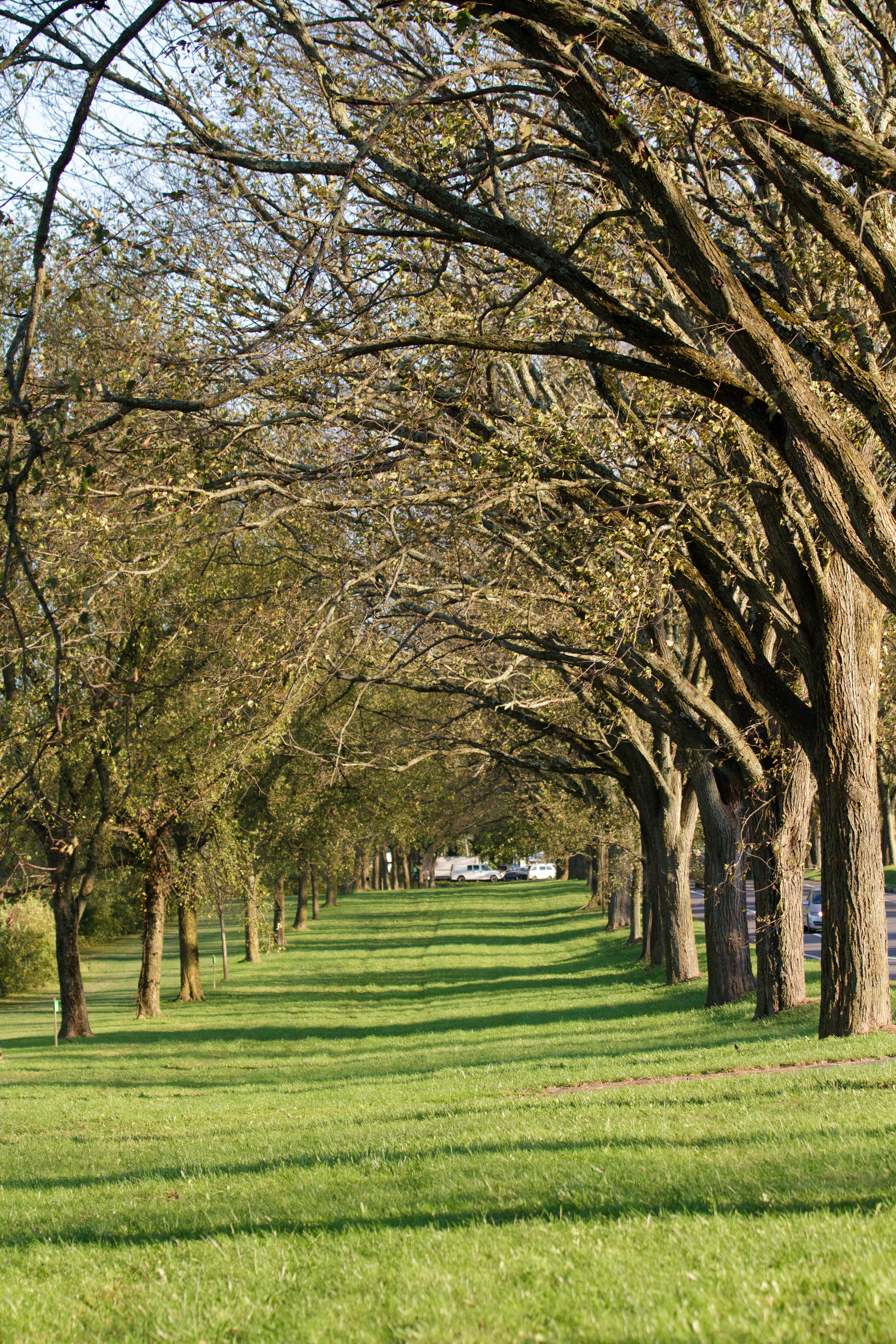
- Mature Princeton Elms on the right, planted in the 1920s, with Delaware Elms planted in 1983 on the left. One of the side allées of the Washington Road Elm Allée in Princeton, New Jersey, United States.
- Species: Ulmus americana
- Cultivar: 'Princeton'
- Marketing names: Princeton American elm
- Origin: Princeton Nurseries

The American elm cultivar Ulmus americana 'Princeton' was originally selected in 1922 by New Jersey nurseryman William Flemer of Princeton Nurseries for its aesthetic merit. 'Princeton' was later found to have a moderate resistance to Dutch elm disease (DED).

== Description ==
American elm is a vase-shaped, medium to large, deciduous tree. The tree can grow to greater than 30 m in height, and is distinguished by its dense, symmetrical, upright form and dark green foliage, ultimately forming a broad umbrella crown. Crotch angles can be acute, with considerable bark inclusion which can later lead to branch breakages. The leaves are less than 16 cm long by 8 cm broad. 'Princeton' grows quickly, young trees increasing in height by over 1.6 m per annum (d.b.h. by 2.8 cm p.a.) in an assessment at U C Davis as part of the National Elm Trial. The tree commences flowering aged nine years.

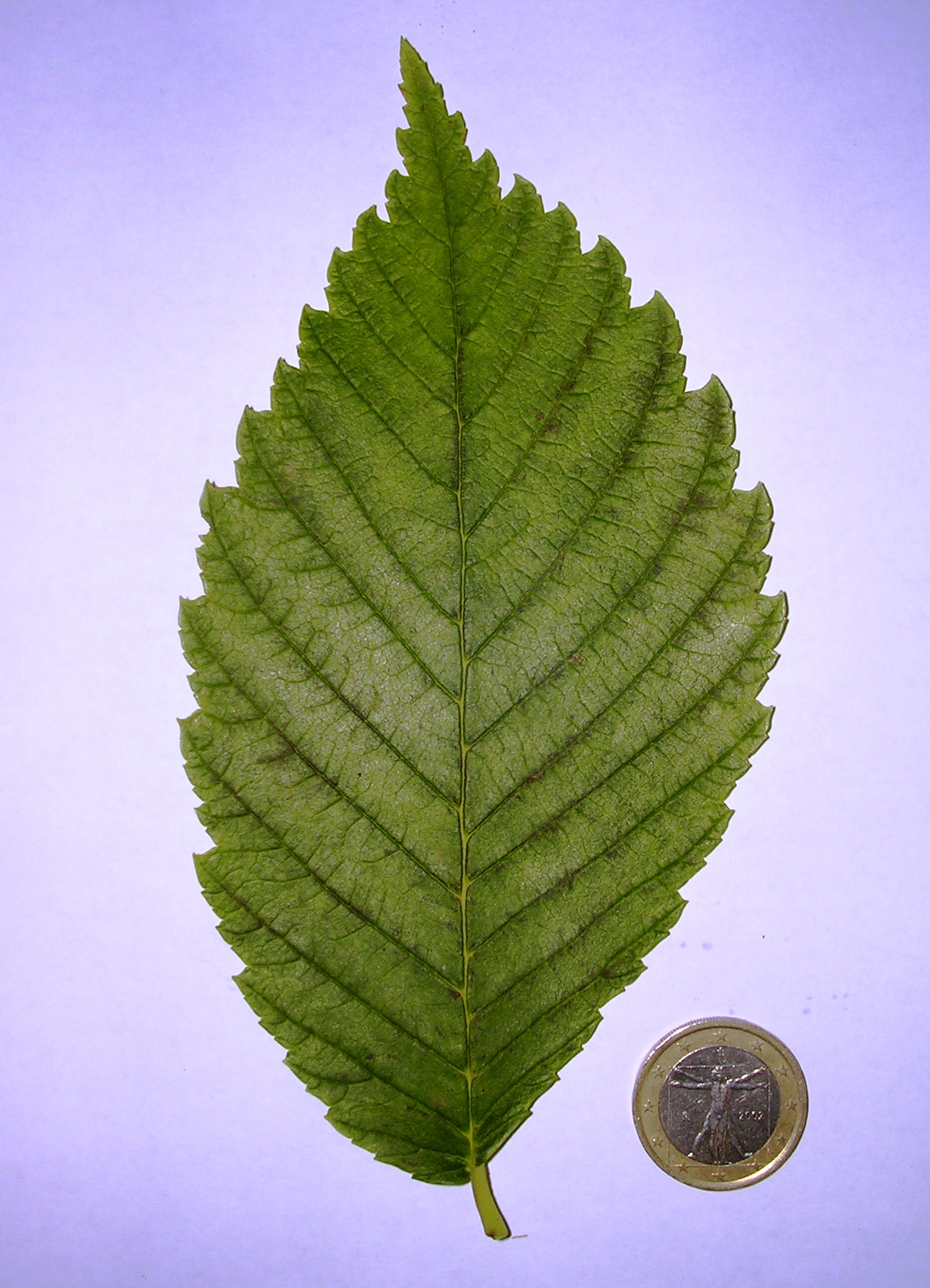
'Princeton' leaf

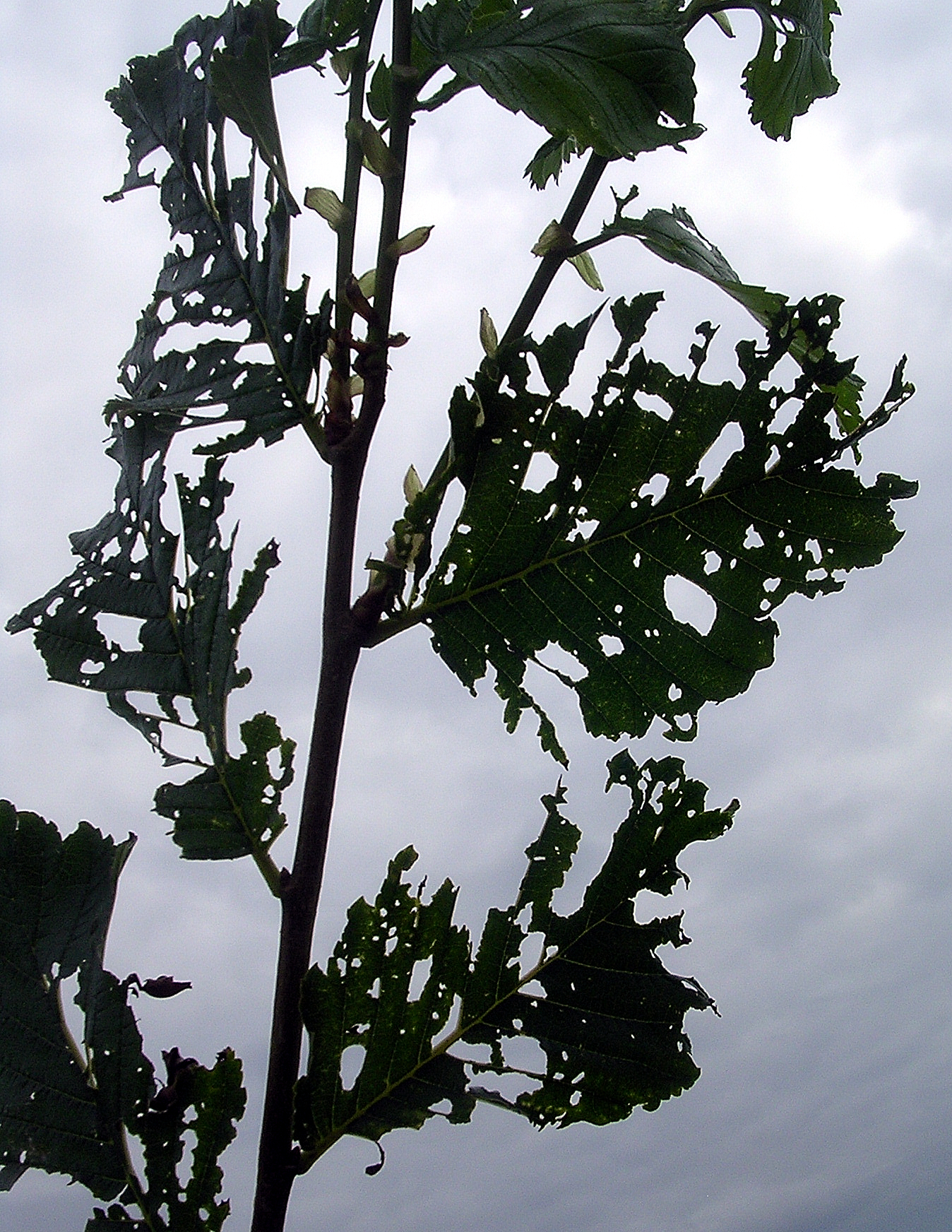
Typical foliage damage sustained in England

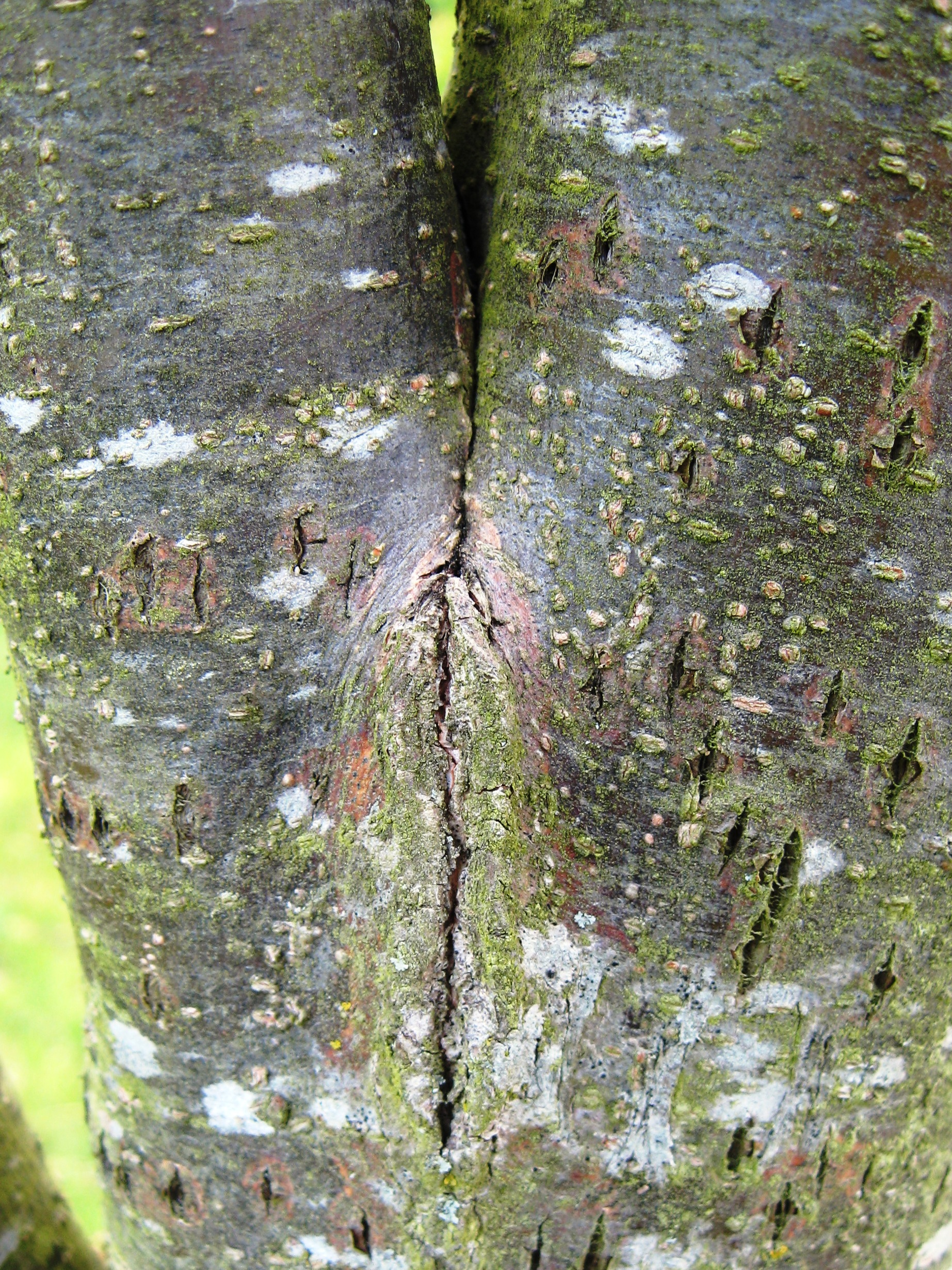
Crotch with bark inclusion

== Pests and diseases ==
Testing in laboratory conditions by the United States Department of Agriculture (USDA) from 1992 to 1993 revealed that 'Princeton' had some resistance to Dutch elm disease (DED), although the original Princeton elm, which grew in Princeton Cemetery and was estimated to be over 150 years old, was felled in April 2005 after suffering 60 percent dieback, attributed by some accounts to Dutch Elm Disease. A 2016 publication later reported that, of 100 Princeton elms planted from 2001 to 2007 within a three state area in the United States, nine came down with DED, seven died, and two were saved by assiduous pruning.

Moreover, trees introduced to the United Kingdom, where the larger bark beetle Scolytus scolytus is the principal vector, were found to be susceptible, and many died, as did all 20 sent to Eisele, Darmstadt, for testing by inoculation with the pathogen. Princeton elms planted in North America are highly prone to leaf damage by Japanese beetles Popillia japonica. Trees grown in the UK have also proven very susceptible to damage by leaf-feeding insects, far more so than native or Asiatic elms. Henry noted that such damage was common to all American elm Ulmus americana grown in the UK. Trees grown in northern California at UC Davis became infested with leaf curling aphids (Eriosoma), producing copious amounts of honeydew.

Regular pruning and spraying is advisable because of Dutch elm disease. The preferred cultivars of the American elm (Ulmus americana) for resistance to DED are 'New Harmony' and 'Princeton' as determined by the National (American) Elm Trial.

== Cultivation ==
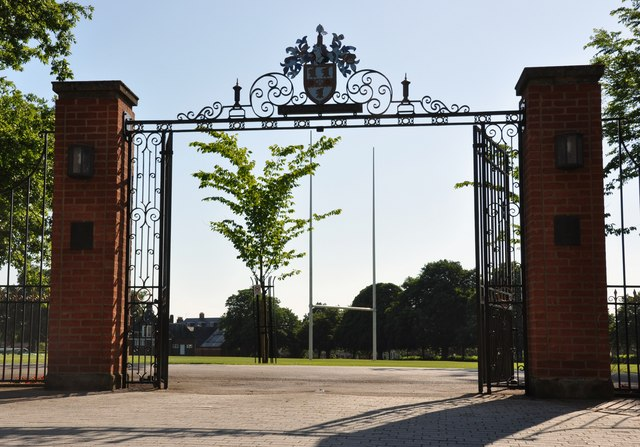
Princeton Elm, Rugby School, Warwickshire, England.

It can be grown in USDA zones 4 through 9, in "...average, medium moisture, well-drained soils in full sun. [It is t]olerant of light shade [and p]refers rich, moist loams [adapting] to both wet and dry sites. [It is g]enerally tolerant of urban conditions."

Examples of 'Princeton' were planted along Washington Road and another road in Princeton; most of these trees survive to this day unaffected by disease. In 2005, approximately 90 Princeton elms were planted along Pennsylvania Avenue in front of the White House in Washington, D.C. 'Princeton' is currently being evaluated in the United States as part of the National Elm Trial coordinated by Colorado State University.

The tree was introduced to the UK by Penelope Hobhouse, who obtained two specimens from the New York Botanical Gardens for planting at her family home, Hadspen, in Somerset. The tree was later marketed by the Knoll Gardens nursery in Dorset. In 2005, 50 'Princeton' were planted by The Prince of Wales to create the Anniversary Avenue at his residence Highgrove House, however all the trees were removed and burnt in 2012 after five died of DED. In Ireland, 100 were planted in Phoenix Park, Dublin, in 2009 to replace some of the 2000 native elms lost to Dutch elm disease since the 1980s. In Scotland, some six have been planted in Edinburgh parks (Gayfield Square Park, The Meadows, Leith Links). In the Netherlands five were planted in 2015 in Overmeerseweg, Nederhorst den Berg, as part of Wijdemeren City Council's elm collection.

== Accessions ==
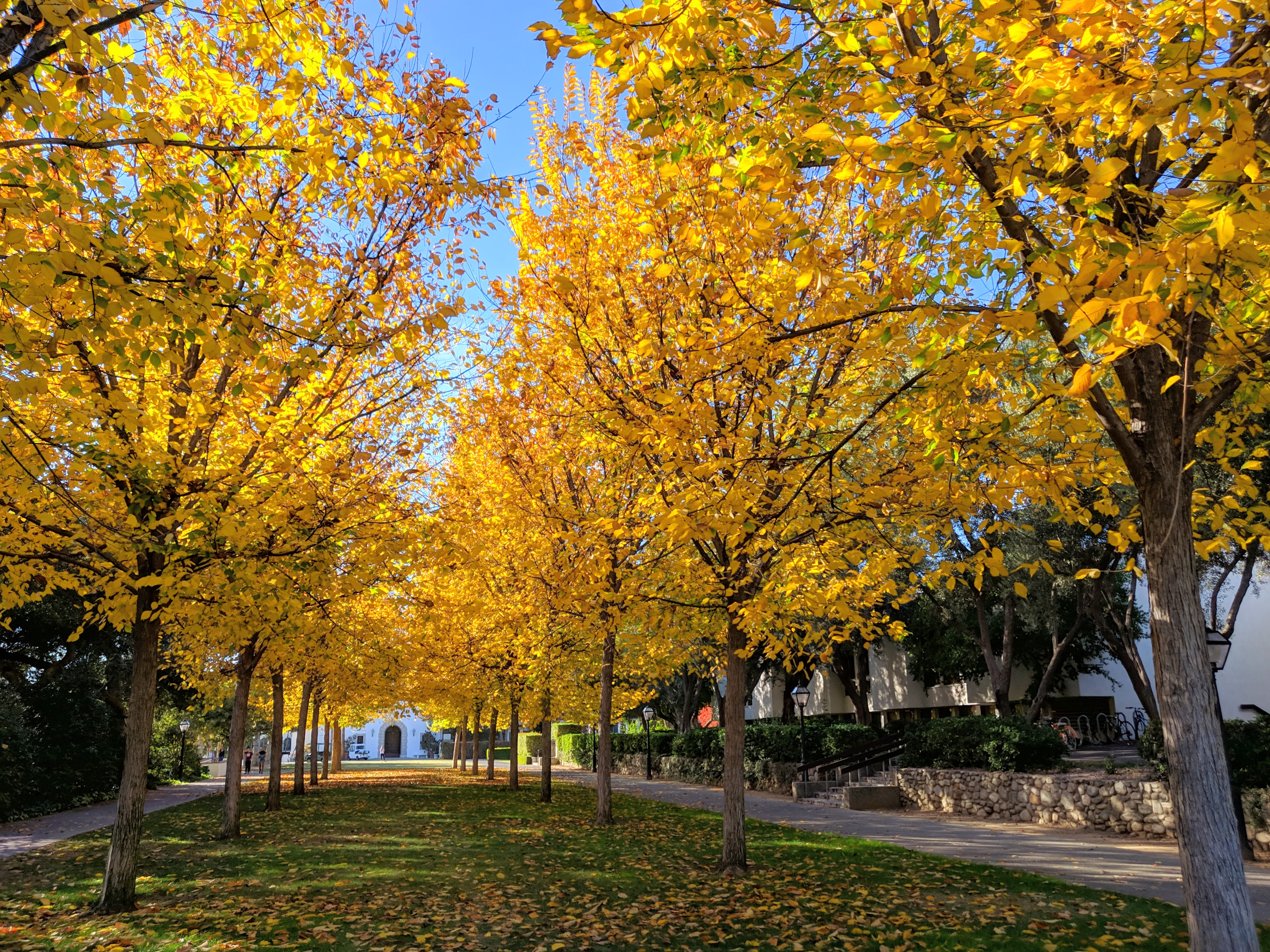
Row of Princeton elm trees at Scripps College in Claremont, California

=== North America ===
- Arnold Arboretum, US. Acc. nos. 352-91, 561-89.
- Bartlett Tree Experts, US. Acc. nos. 2001-249, 2001-250, 2001-251, 2001-484, 2001-485, 2003-964.
- Brentwood, Pennsylvania Arboretum, US. 11 specimens planted as street trees along educational campus, no acc. details available.
- Dawes Arboretum, , Newark, Ohio, US. 2 trees, no acc. details available.
- Holden Arboretum, US. Acc. nos. 2002-435, 2003-174, 56-908.
- Longwood Gardens, US. Acc. nos. 2000-0362, 2002-0414, 2003-0032, 2004-0675.
- Morton Arboretum, US. Acc. no. 125-2008.
- U S National Arboretum , Washington, D.C., US. Acc. no. 57842

=== Europe ===
- Brighton & Hove City Council, UK. NCCPG Elm Collection.
- Grange Farm Arboretum, Sutton St. James, Spalding, Lincs. UK. Acc. no. 697.
- Royal Horticultural Society Gardens, Wisley, UK. Planted bed WA 0201, c.2002.
- Royal Botanic Gardens, Kew, UK. Acc. no. not known.

== Nurseries ==
=== North America ===
- Carlton Plants, LLC, Dayton, Oregon, US.
- Charles Fiore Nurseries, Prairie View, Illinois, US.
- Johnson Farms, Deerfield, New Jersey, US.
- Riveredge Farms, Atlanta, Georgia, US.
- Sharp Top Trees, White, Georgia, US.
- The Botany Shop Garden Center, Joplin, Missouri, US.
