= Elms in Australia =

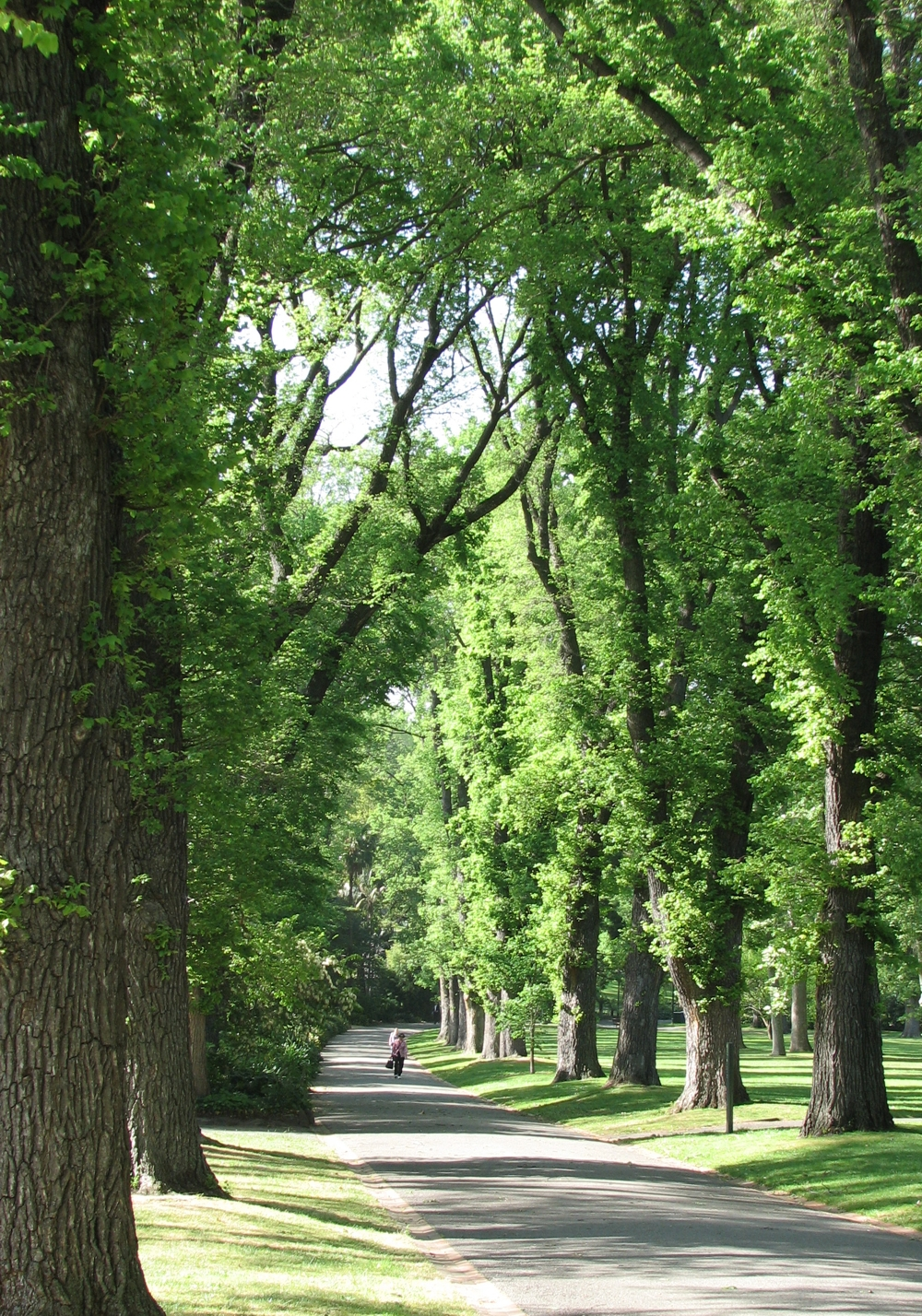
English elm in Fitzroy Gardens, Melbourne

The cultivation of elms in Australia began in the first half of the 19th century, when British settlers imported species and cultivars from their former homelands. Owing to the demise of elms in the Northern Hemisphere as a result of the Dutch elm disease pandemic, the mature trees in Australia's parks and gardens are now regarded as amongst the most significant in the world.

== Species and cultivars ==
A large number of species and cultivars are grown in Australia. The commercial availability and popularity of the various varieties has changed over time. "Deliberate planting of selected clones", wrote Spencer (1995) "combined with chance hybridisation, has resulted in a mix of elms rather different from that in England".

=== English elm ===
English elm (Ulmus procera) was a popular tree for park and avenue planting in the nineteenth century. One of the oldest known exotic trees in Victoria is the sole survivor of four planted in the newly established Royal Botanic Gardens in 1846.

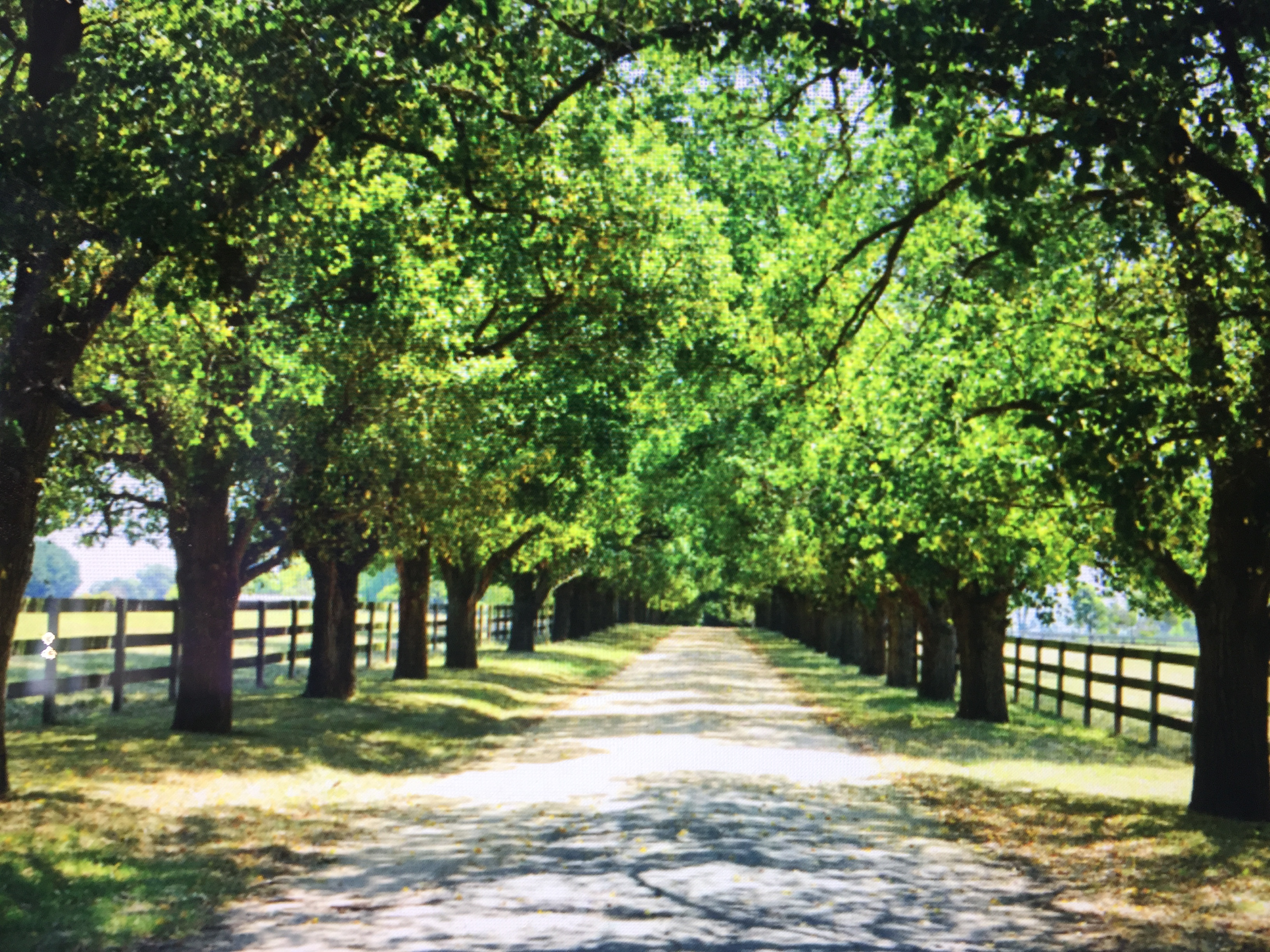
An avenue of heritage-listed English elm at Tulliallan, Melbourne, Victoria

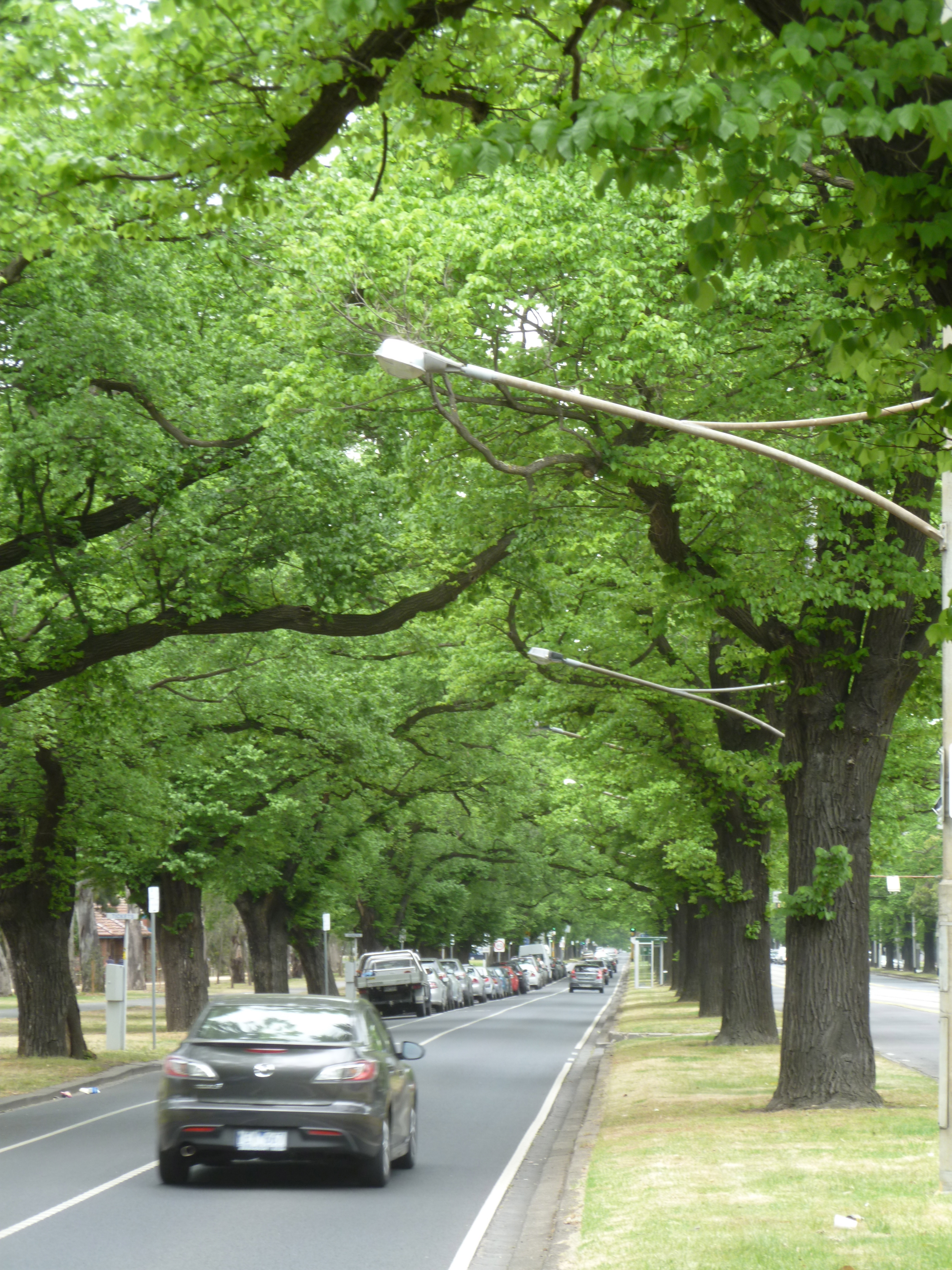
English elm on Royal Parade, Parkville, Melbourne

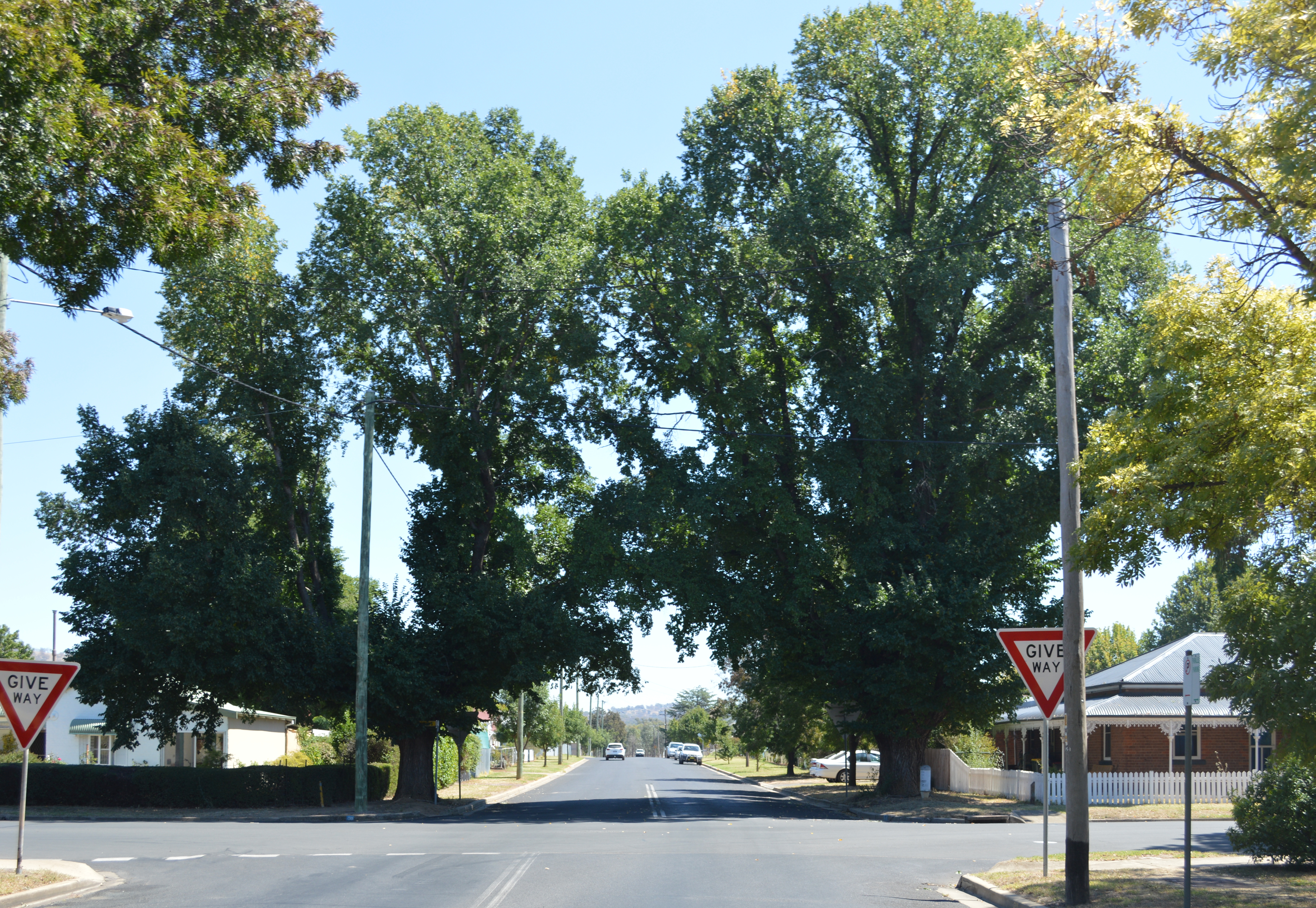
English elm, Cootamundra, one trimmed for power line

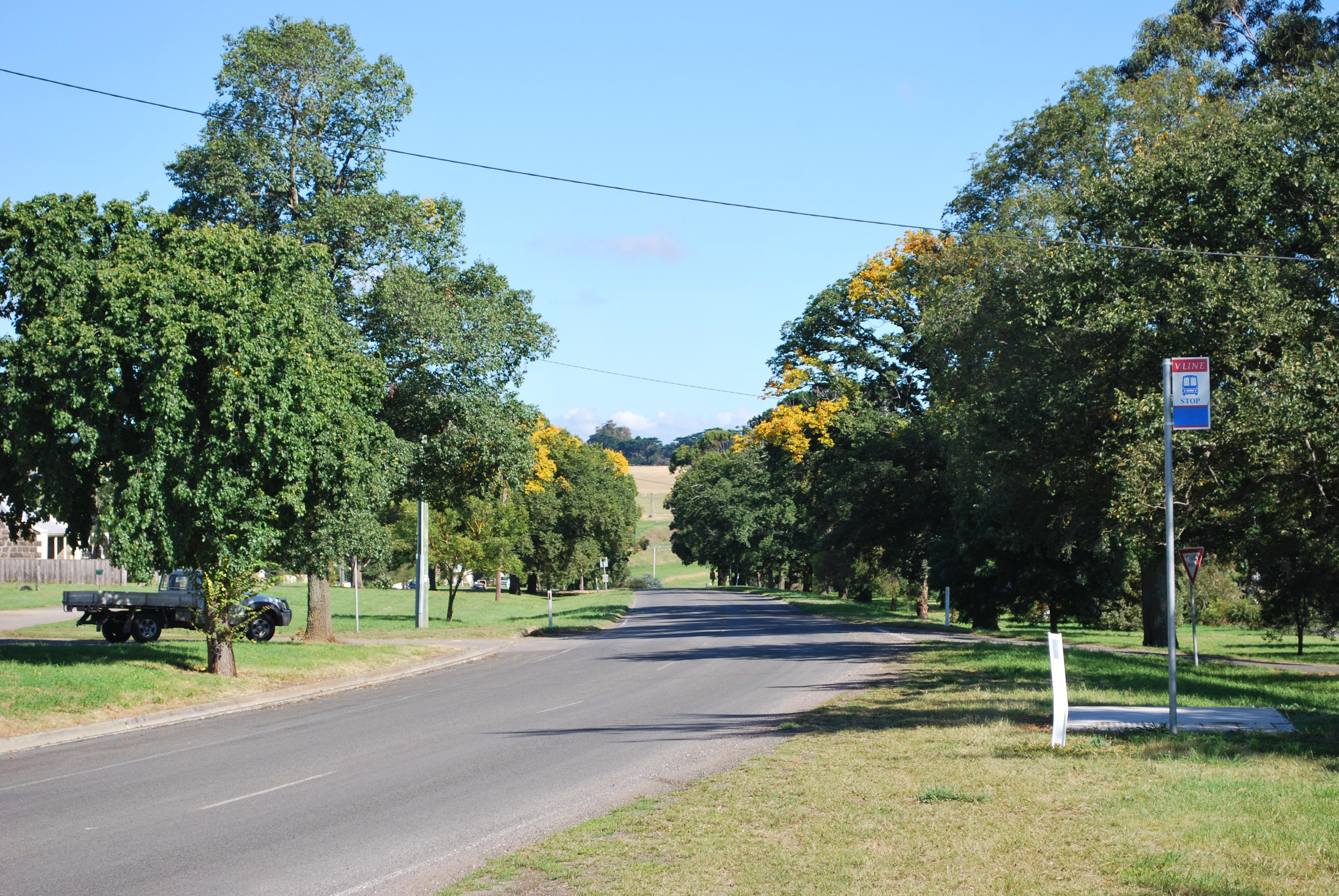
English elm in early autumn, Myrniong

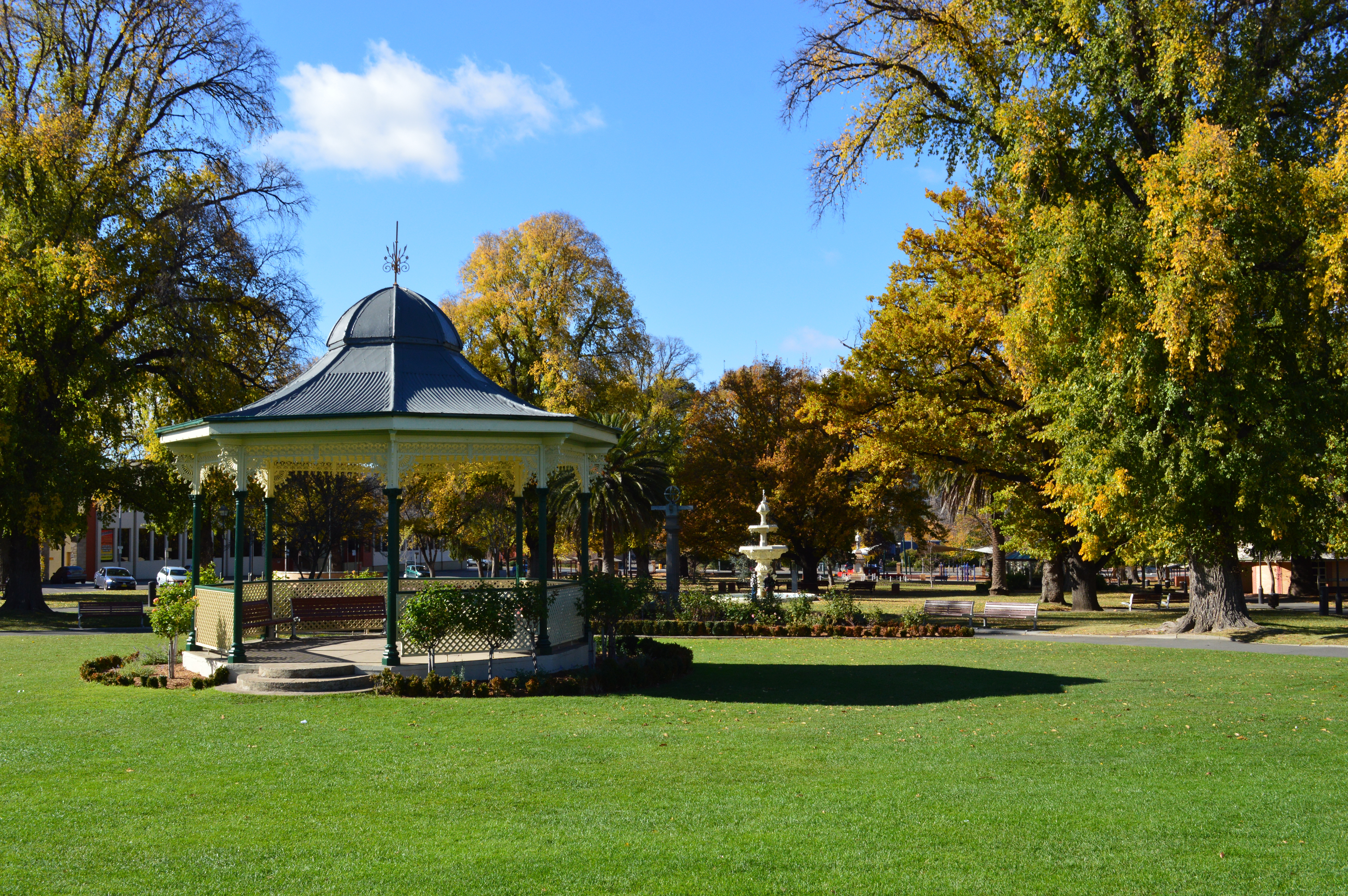
English elm in autumn, Belmore Park, Goulburn

=== Dutch elm ===
Cultivars of the hybrid Dutch elm (Ulmus x hollandica) are among the most commonly seen elms in Australia. They include 'Major', 'Vegeta', 'Dauvessei', 'Dovaei, 'Wredei', 'Canadian Giant' / Canadian elm, and 'Purpurascens'. 'Major' was distributed in Victoria from the 1850s and 'Vegeta' from the 1860s. 'Cicestria' was marketed in Australia in the early 20th century by the former Gembrook or Nobelius Nursery. Some hybrid elms of this group introduced to Australia from England are "commonly and erroneously referred to [in Australia] as 'English elm' ". Similarly, an old tree labelled U. procera in Dunedin Botanic Garden, New Zealand (2023), may be an elm from England, but it is not the English elm clone.

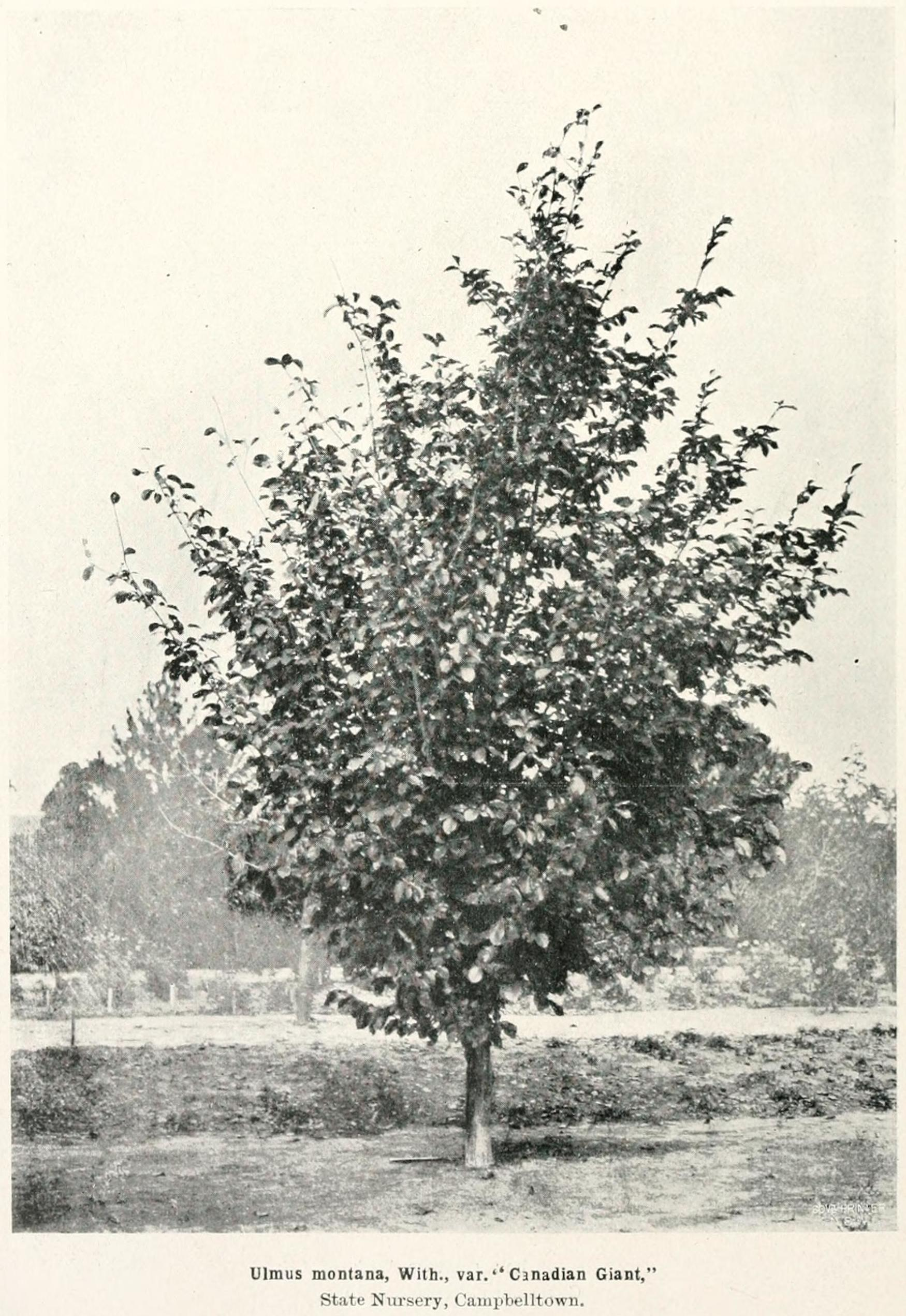
'Canadian Giant', State Nursery, Campbelltown, New South Wales

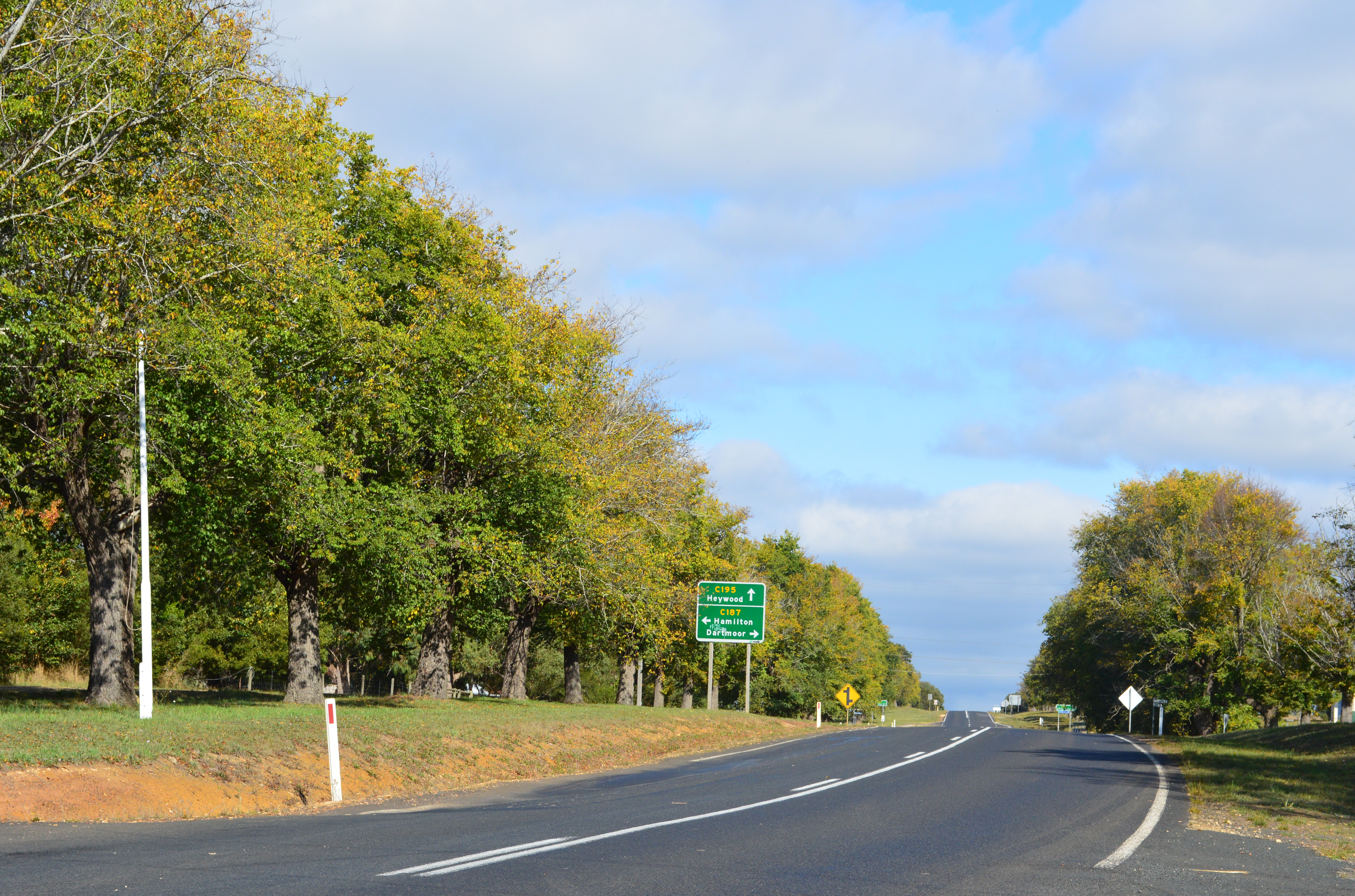
Canadian elm ( = 'Canadian Giant'), Avenue of Honour, Digby, Victoria (2015), grown back after pruning

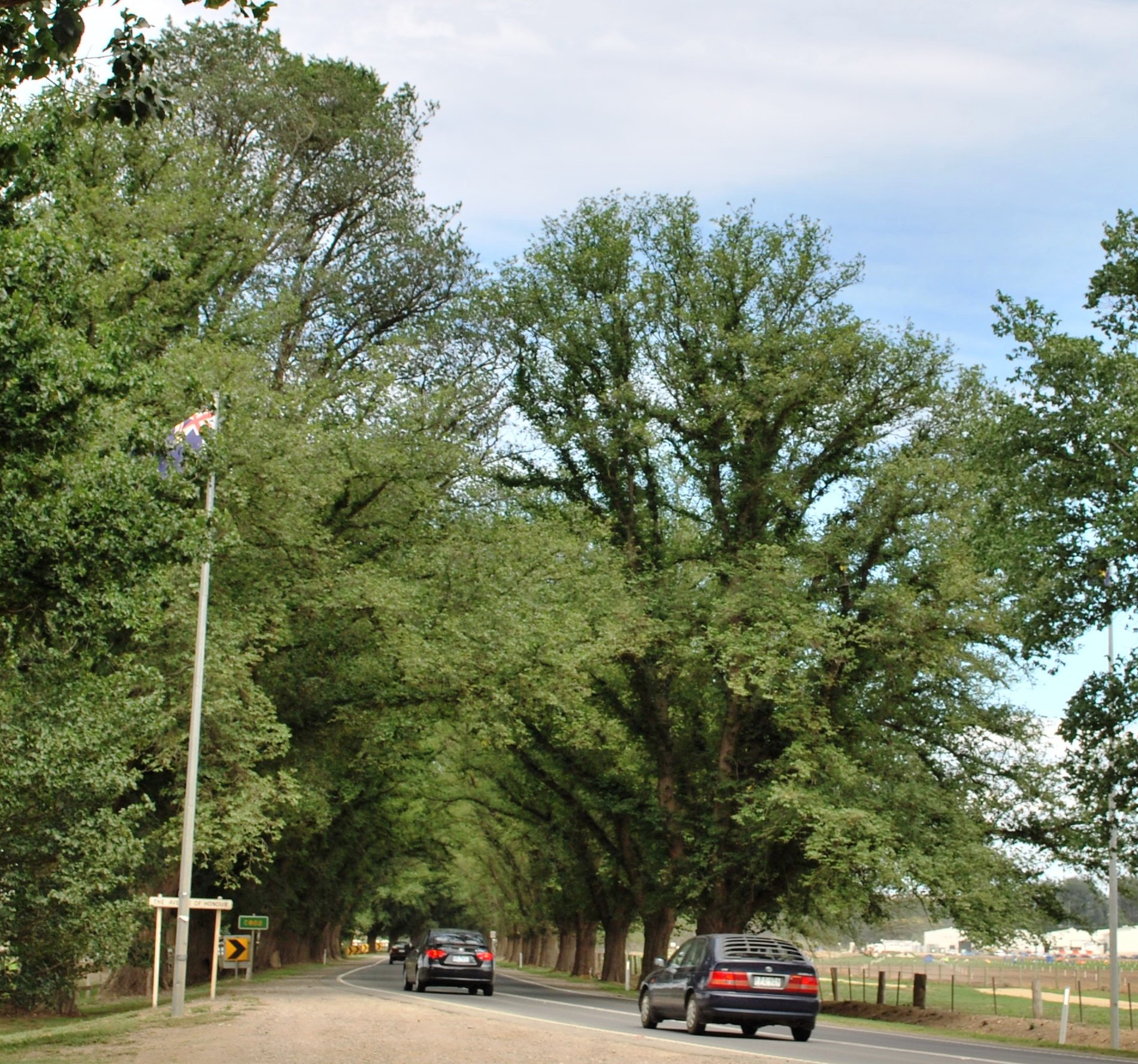
'Canadian Giant' (right), 'Vegeta' (left), Avenue of Honour, Bacchus Marsh, Victoria (2008)

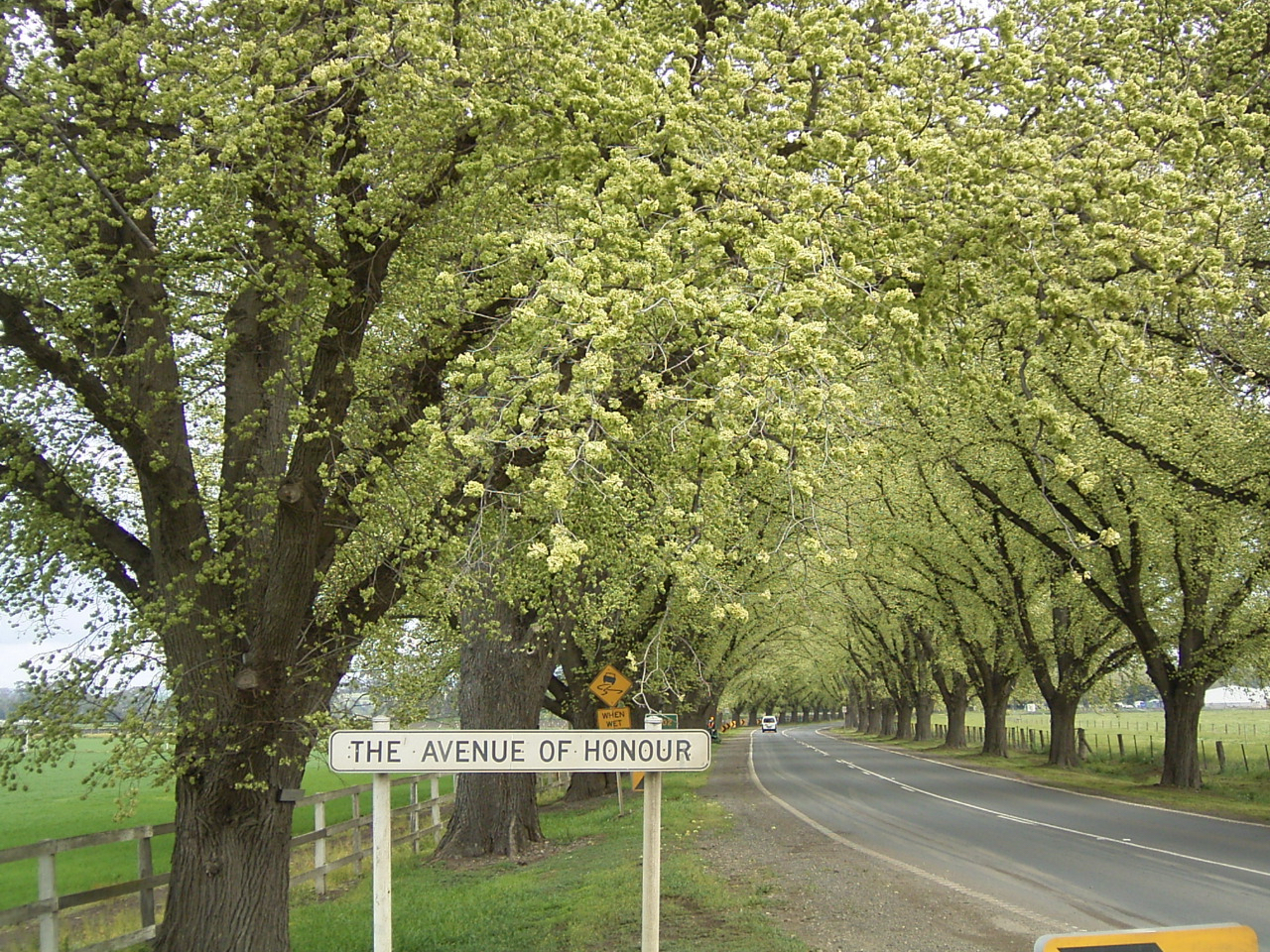
'Canadian Giant' fruiting, September, Bacchus Marsh Avenue of Honour

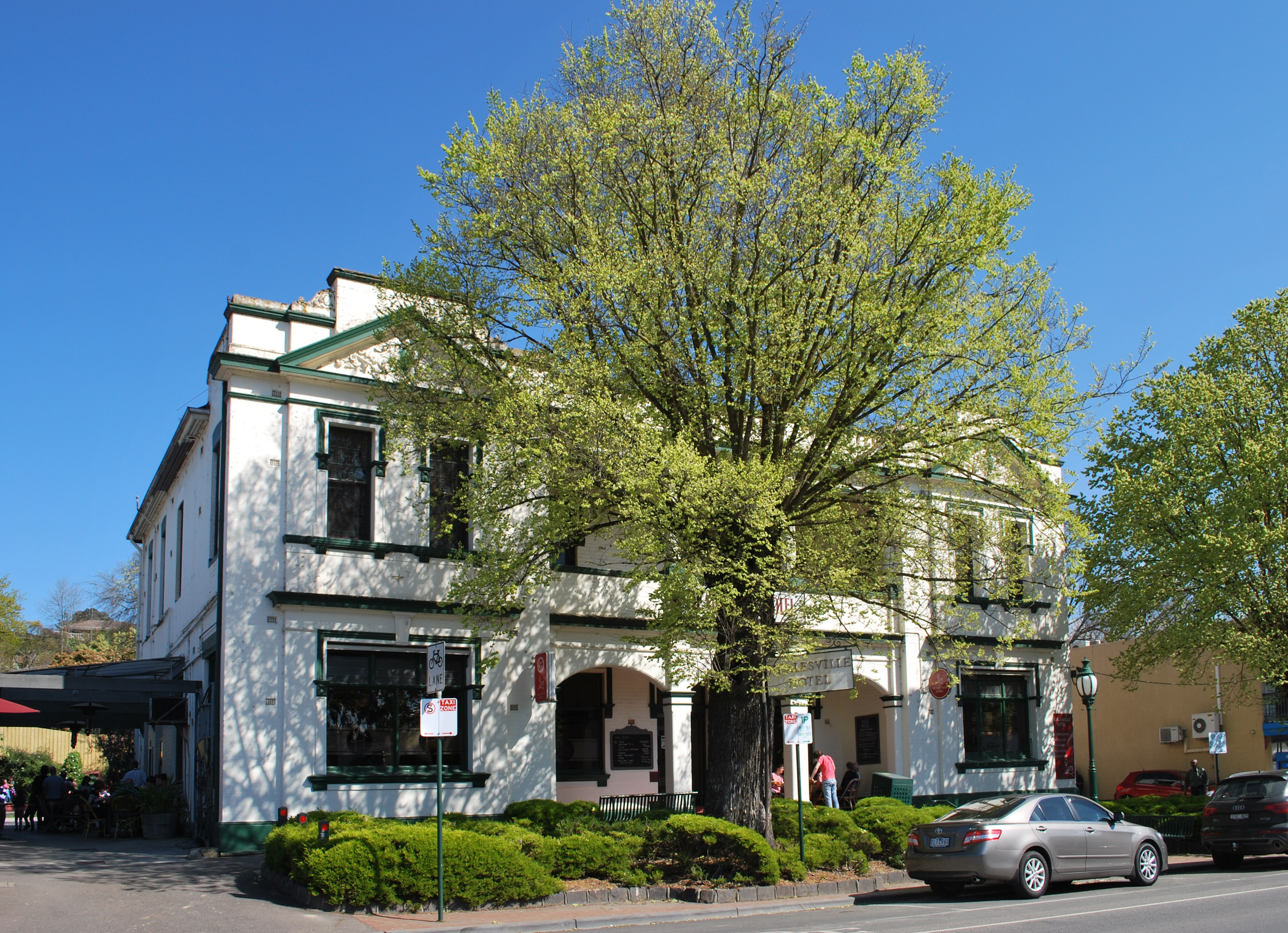
'Vegeta' in Healesville, Victoria

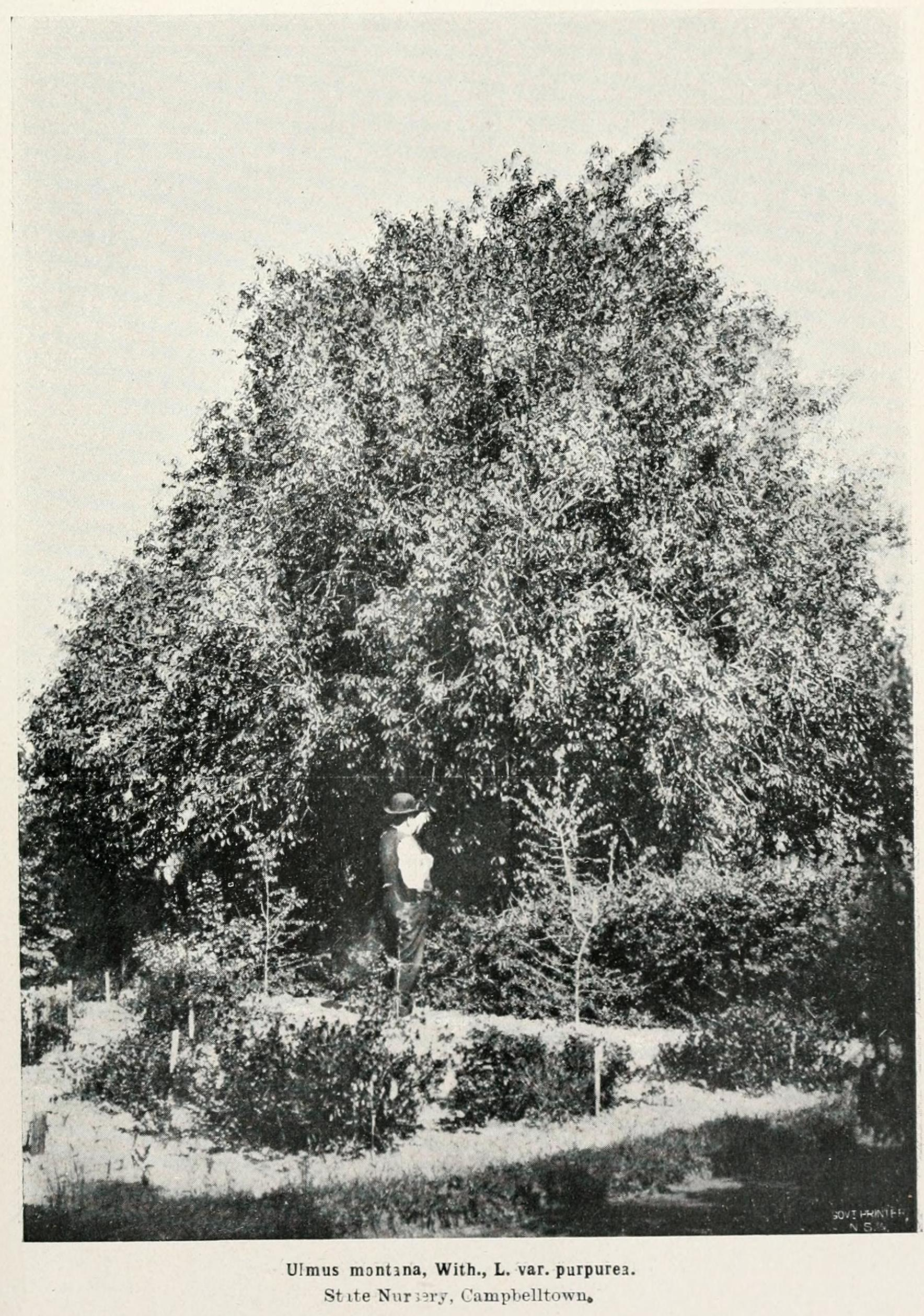
'Purpurascens', State Nursery, Campbelltown, New South Wales

=== Chinese elm ===
Chinese elm (Ulmus parvifolia) became commercially available in Australia in the late 1850s and regained popularity in the 1980s. In recent years a number of Chinese elm cultivars have been introduced into cultivation including the American bred variety 'Emer I', the Japanese introductions 'Frosty' and 'Nire-keyaki', and a number of Australian selections including 'Burnley Select', 'Churchyard', 'Todd' and 'Yarralumla'.

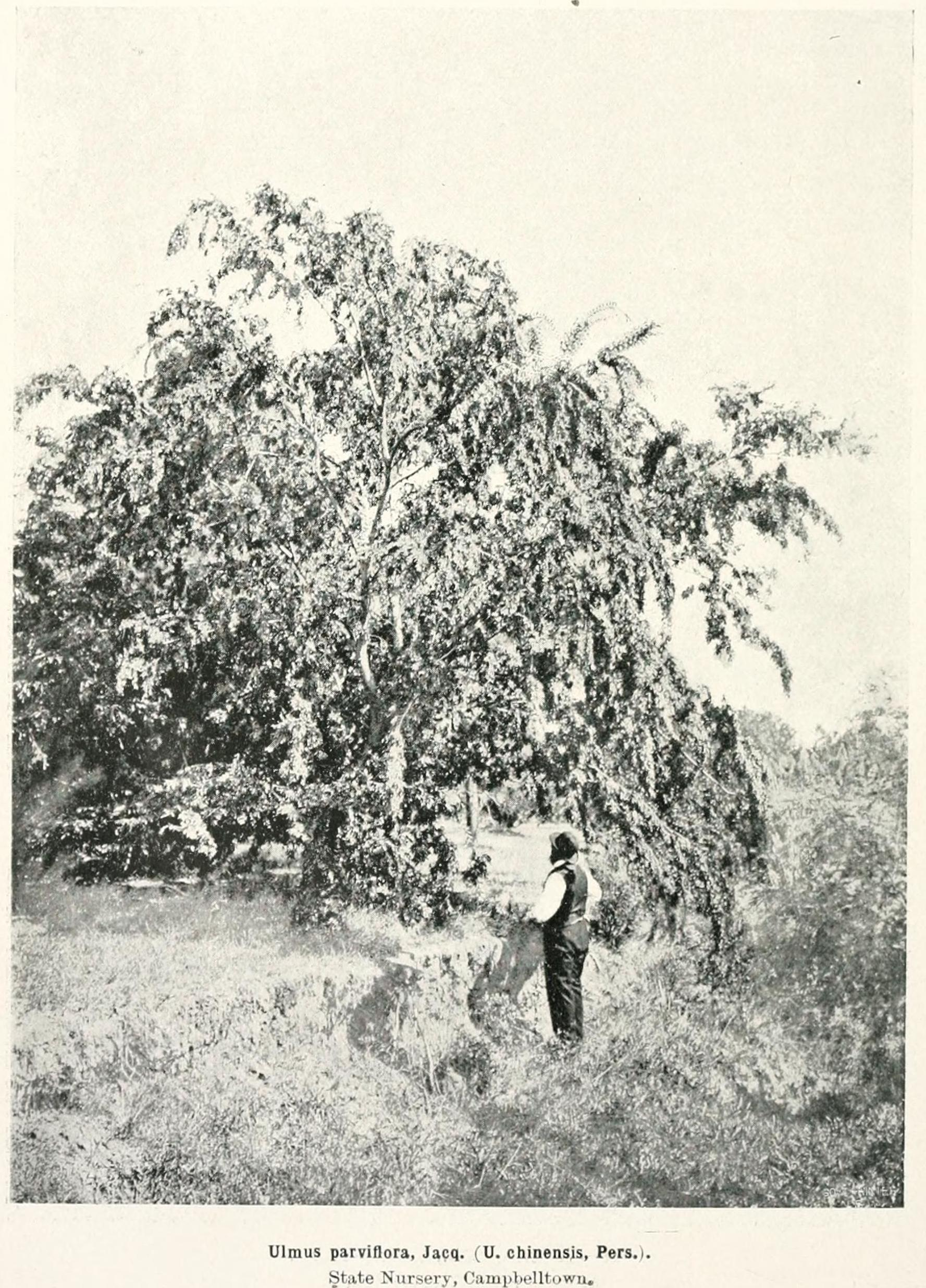
Ulmus parvifolia, State Nursery, Campbelltown, New South Wales

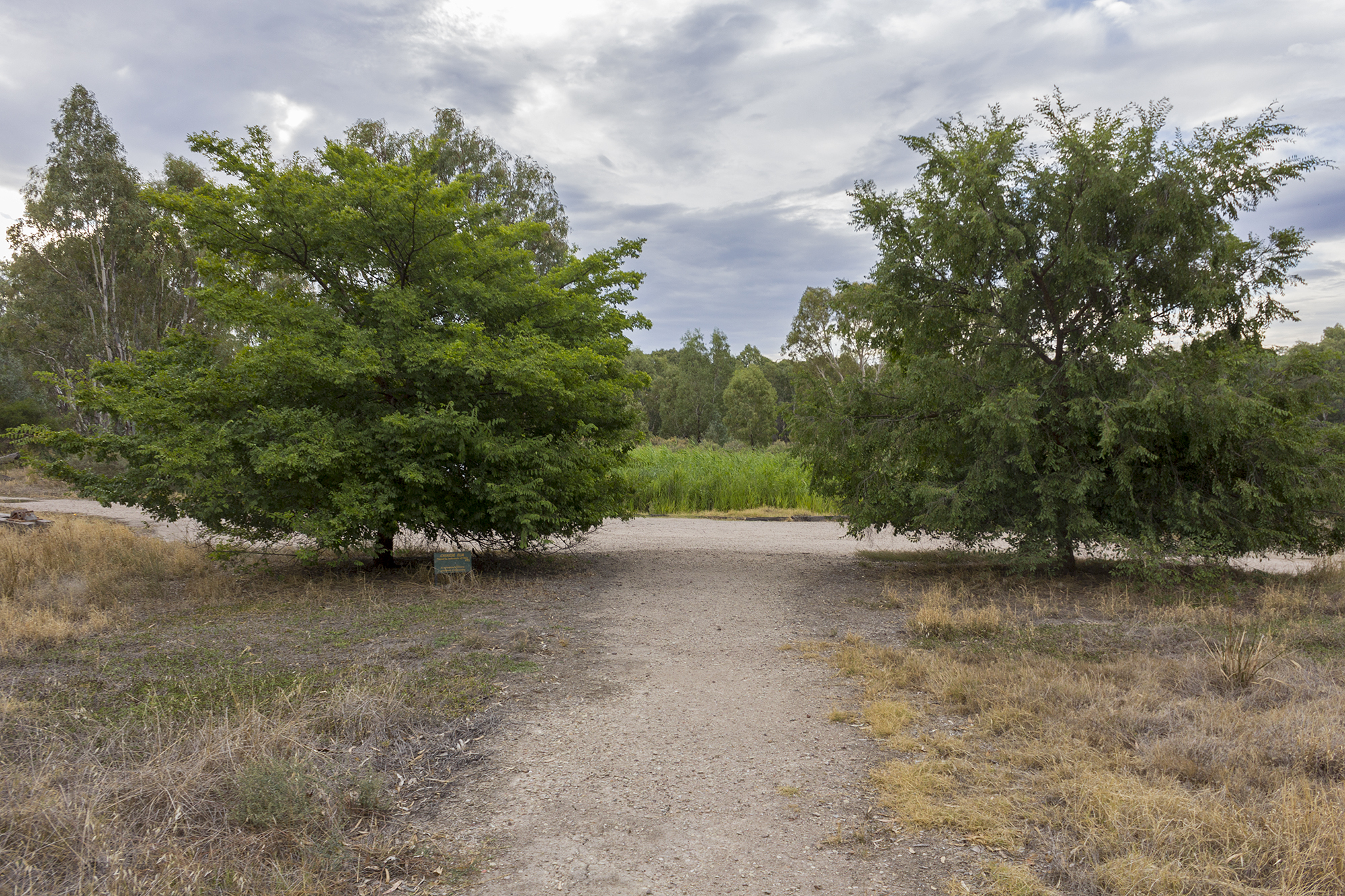
Two Chinese elms at the trail entrance of the Narrandera Wetlands, NSW, planted in 1995

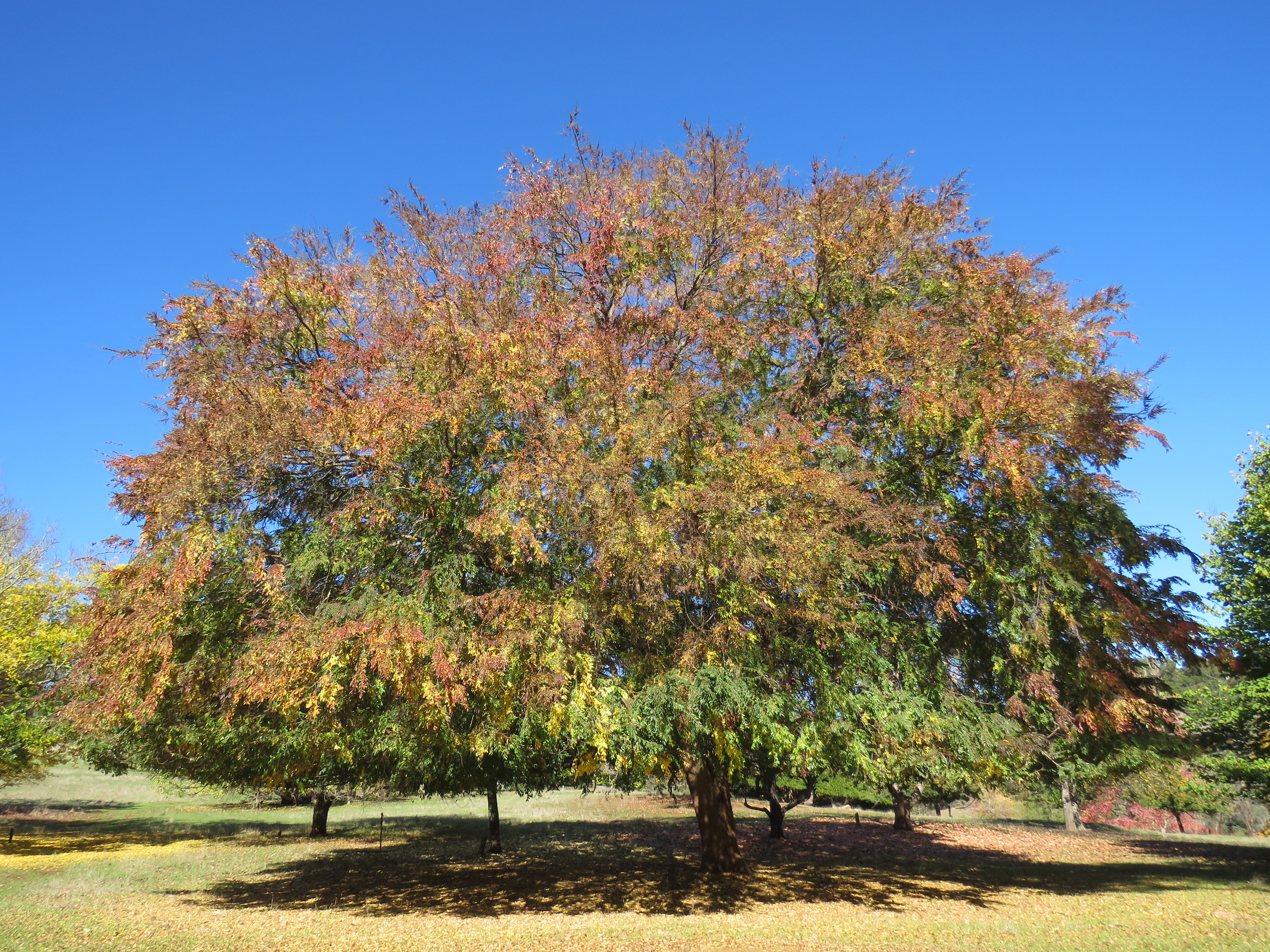
Ulmus parvifolia, Golden Valley Tree Park, Western Australia, planted in 1982 (May 2022)

=== Wych elm or Scots elm ===
Wych elm or Scots elm (Ulmus glabra Huds.) was introduced to Australia in 1860. A number of related cultivars were planted as "rarities" in the Victorian era including the weeping wych elm 'Horizontalis' (from 1865), the Camperdown elm and the Exeter elm (both from 1873). The golden elm (U. glabra 'Lutescens'), which was introduced to Australia in the early 1900s, has become one of the most popular varieties of elms in the country. In the past it was often mistakenly sold by nurseries under the name 'Louis van Houtte'.

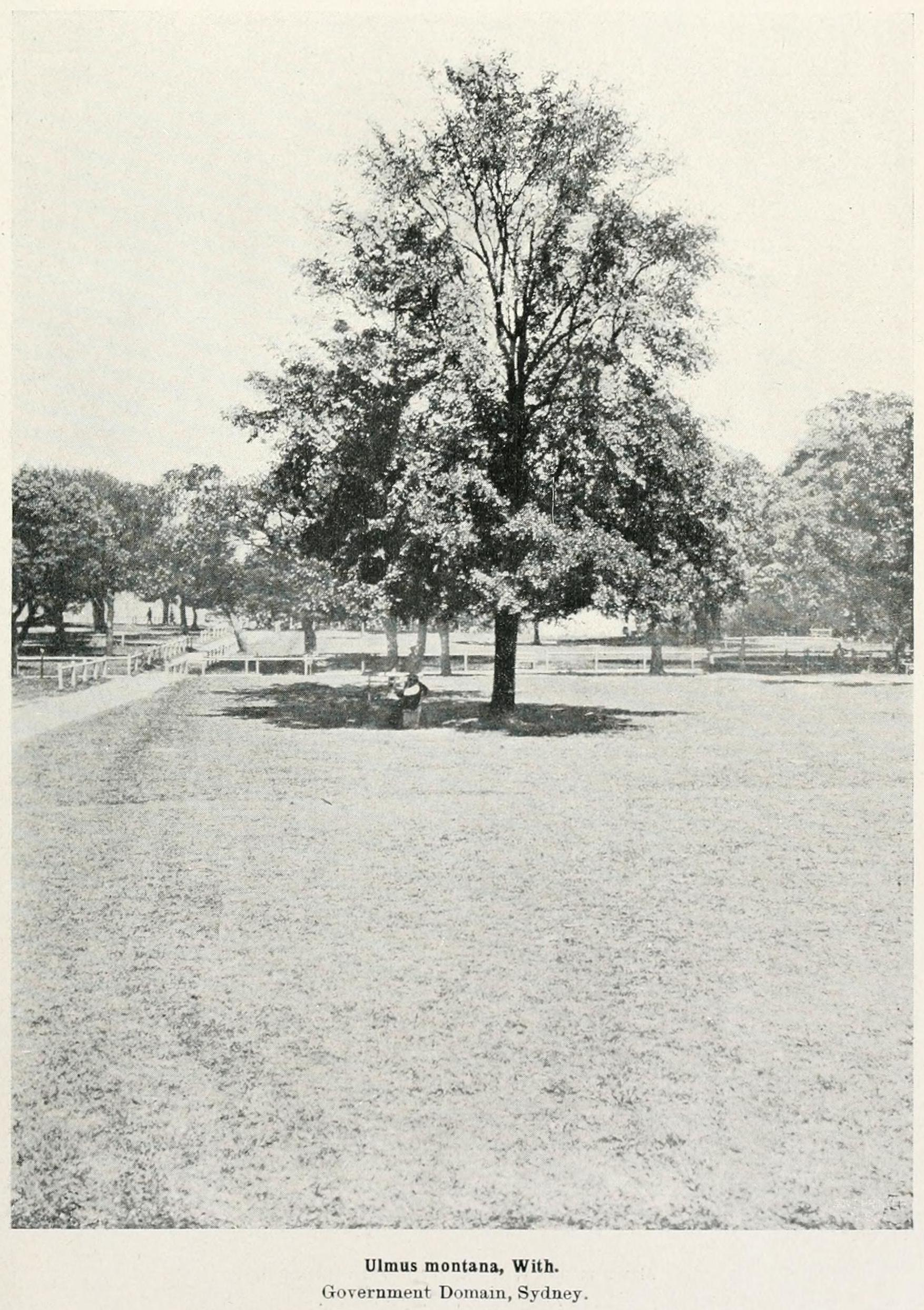
Wych elm, Government Domain, Sydney

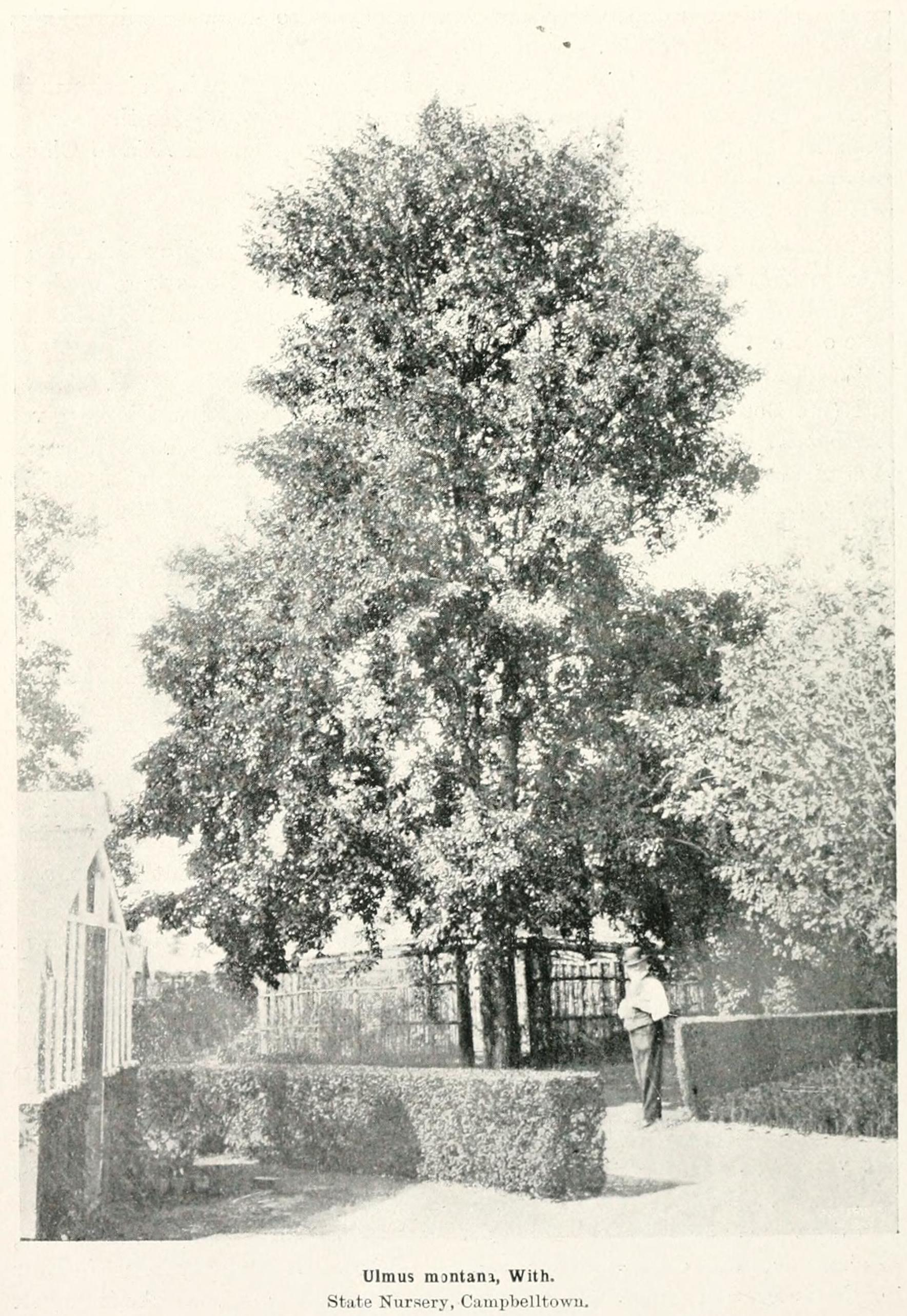
Wych elm, State Nursery, Campbelltown, NSW

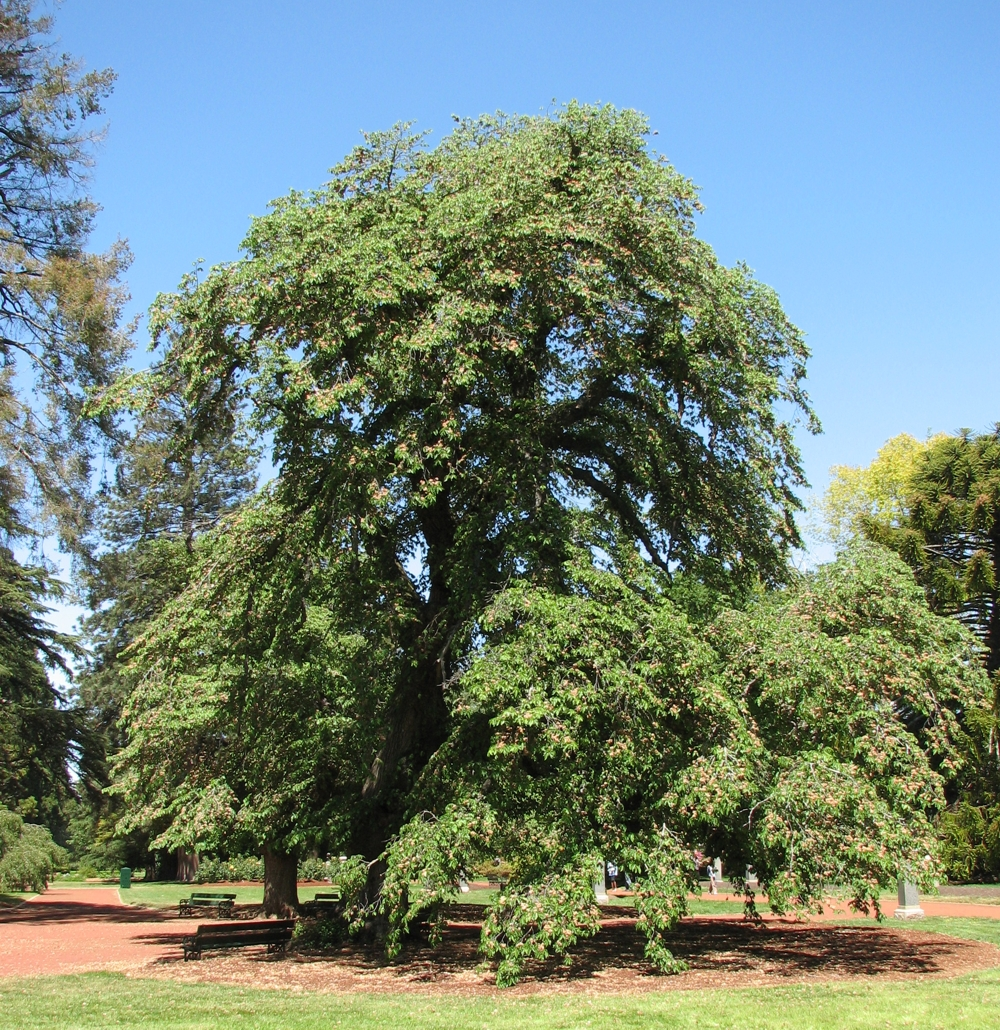
'Horizontalis', Ballarat Botanical Garden, Victoria

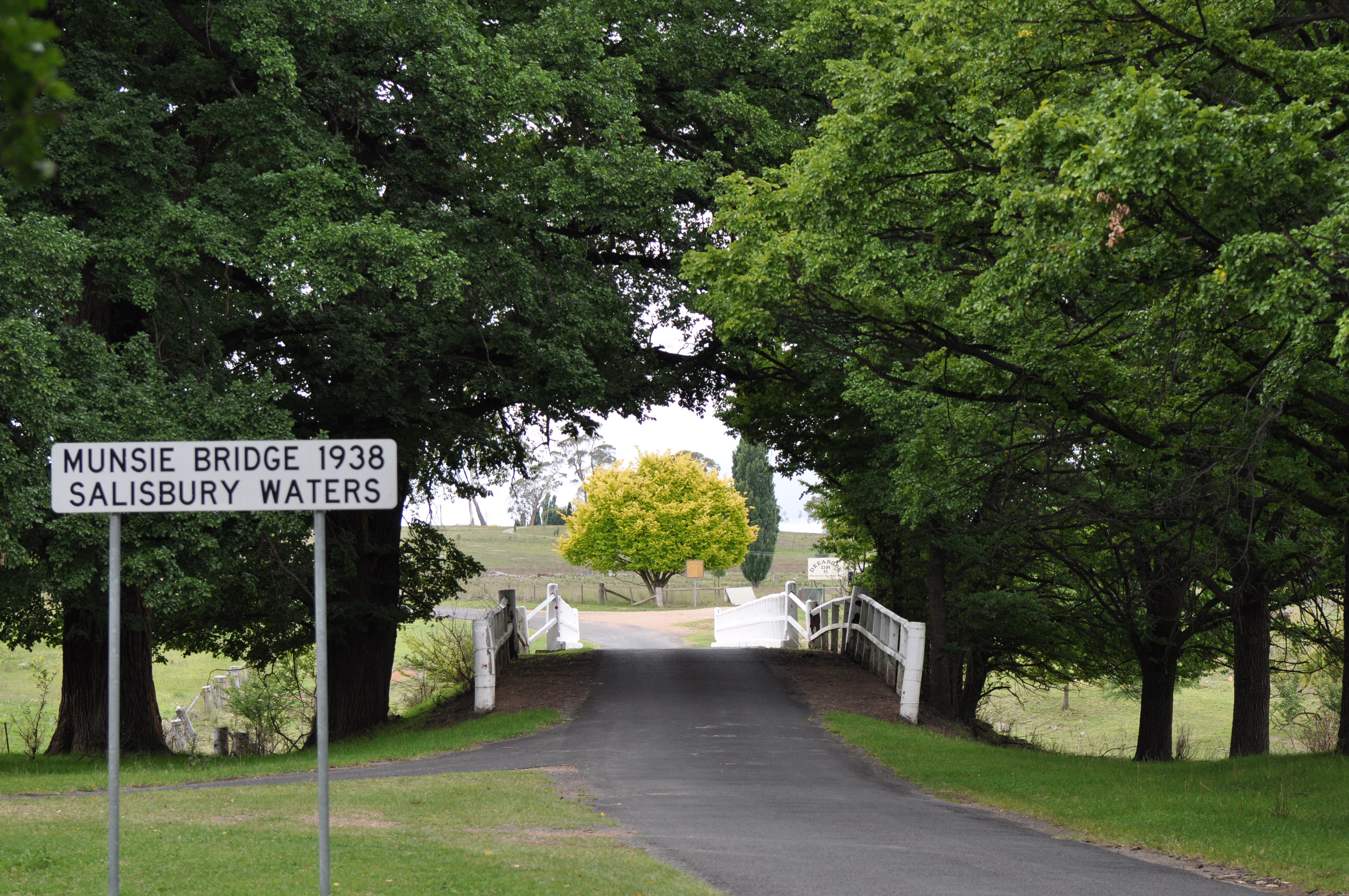
Golden elm (Ulmus glabra 'Lutescens'), framed by English elm, Gostwyck, near Uralla, New South Wales

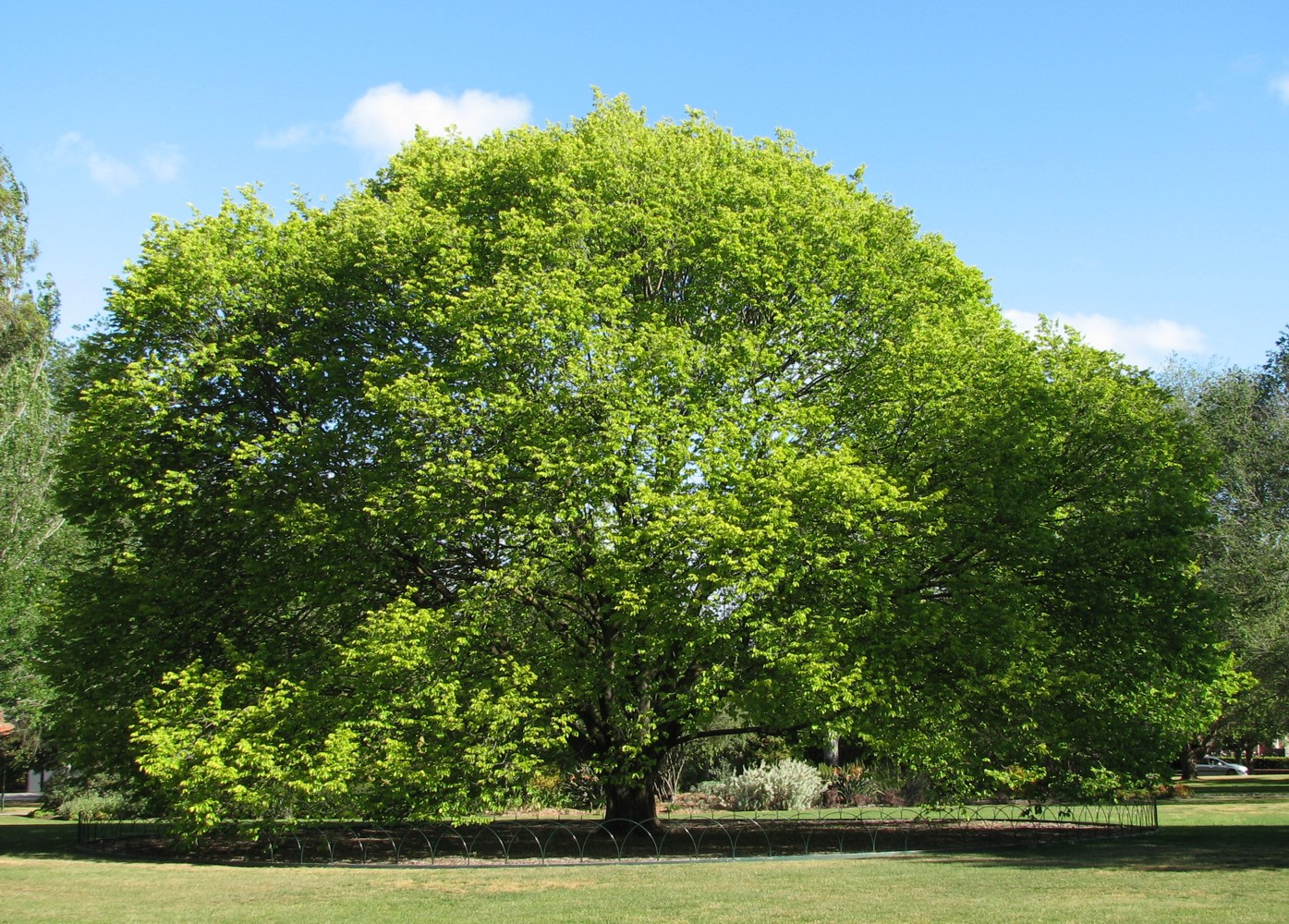
Golden elm (Ulmus glabra 'Lutescens') in Central Gardens, Malvern, Victoria

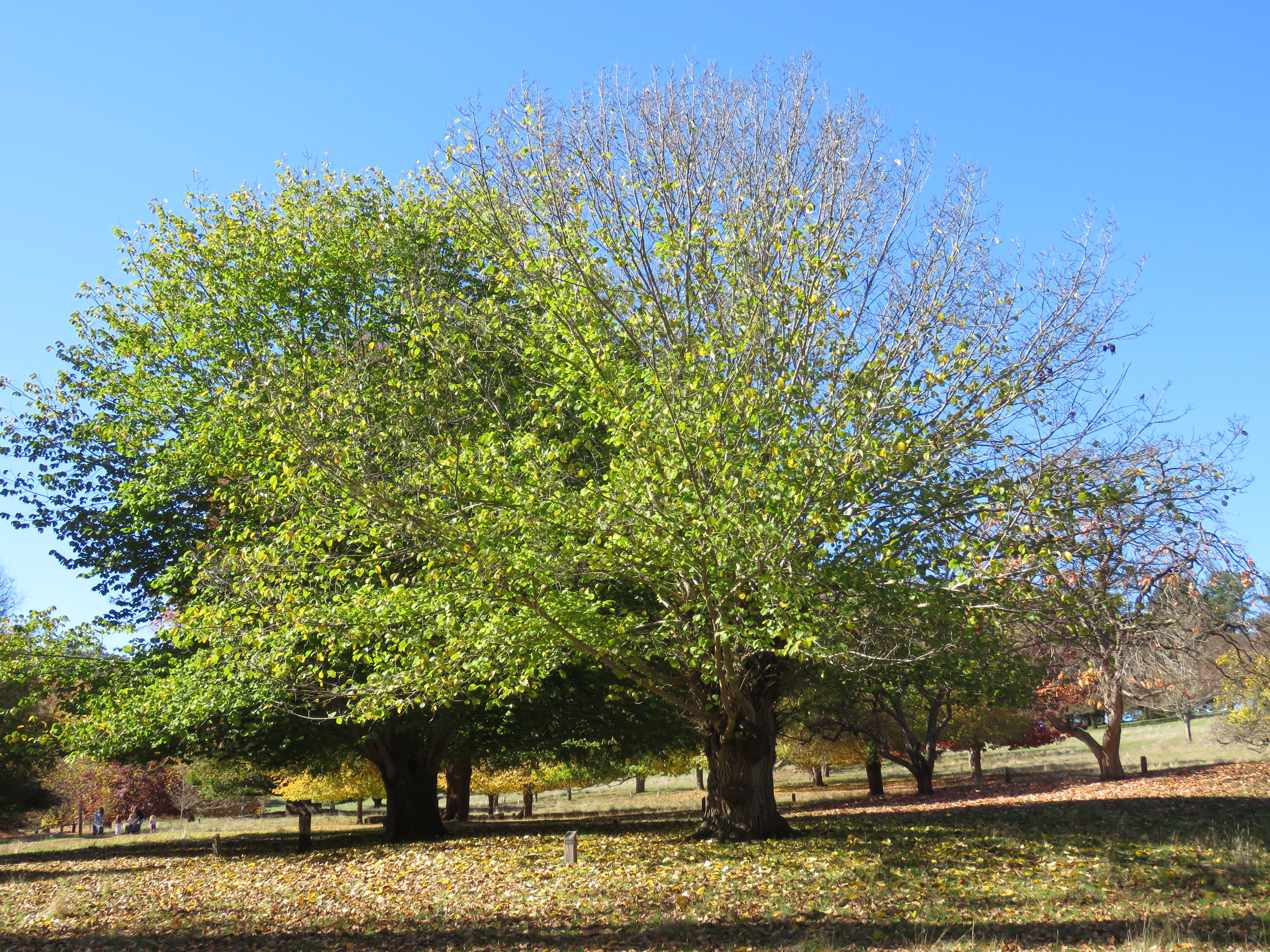
Two Ulmus glabra Huds. in Golden Valley Tree Park, Western Australia (2022)

=== Smooth-leaved elm ===
Smooth-leaved elm (Ulmus minor subsp. minor), and field elm (Ulmus minor) cultivars other than English elm, are not as common in Australia as other species. The silver elm (U. minor 'Variegata') is the most commonly seen variety of this species, particularly in older botanic gardens and parks. Other introductions include a cultivar called 'Cornubiensis' but not type-Cornish elm (Ulmus minor 'Stricta'), Guernsey elm (Ulmus minor 'Sarniensis'), cork-barked elm (Ulmus minor var. suberosa (Moench), Rehder, = Ulmus minor Mill.), weeping cork-barked elm (possibly Ulmus minor 'Propendens'), pendulous field elm (Ulmus minor 'Pendula'), as well as Ulmus minor 'Viminalis' and its related cultivars 'Viminalis Aurea', 'Viminalis Marginata'. A fastigiate form of smooth-leaved elm was selected by the City of Melbourne for street planting, but was later found to have a problem with spitting at "V" crotches.

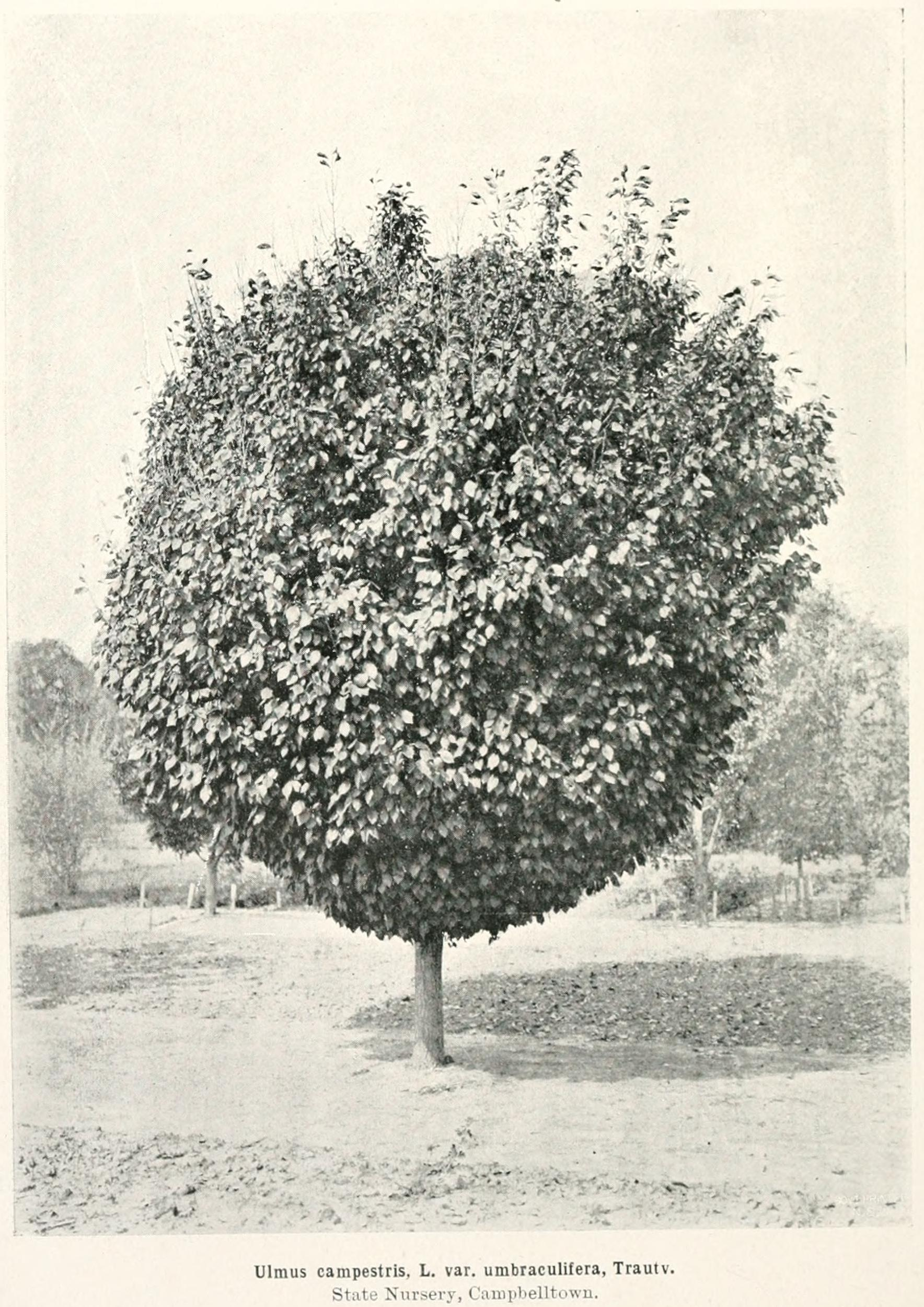
Ulmus minor 'Umbraculifera', State Nursery, Campbelltown, NSW

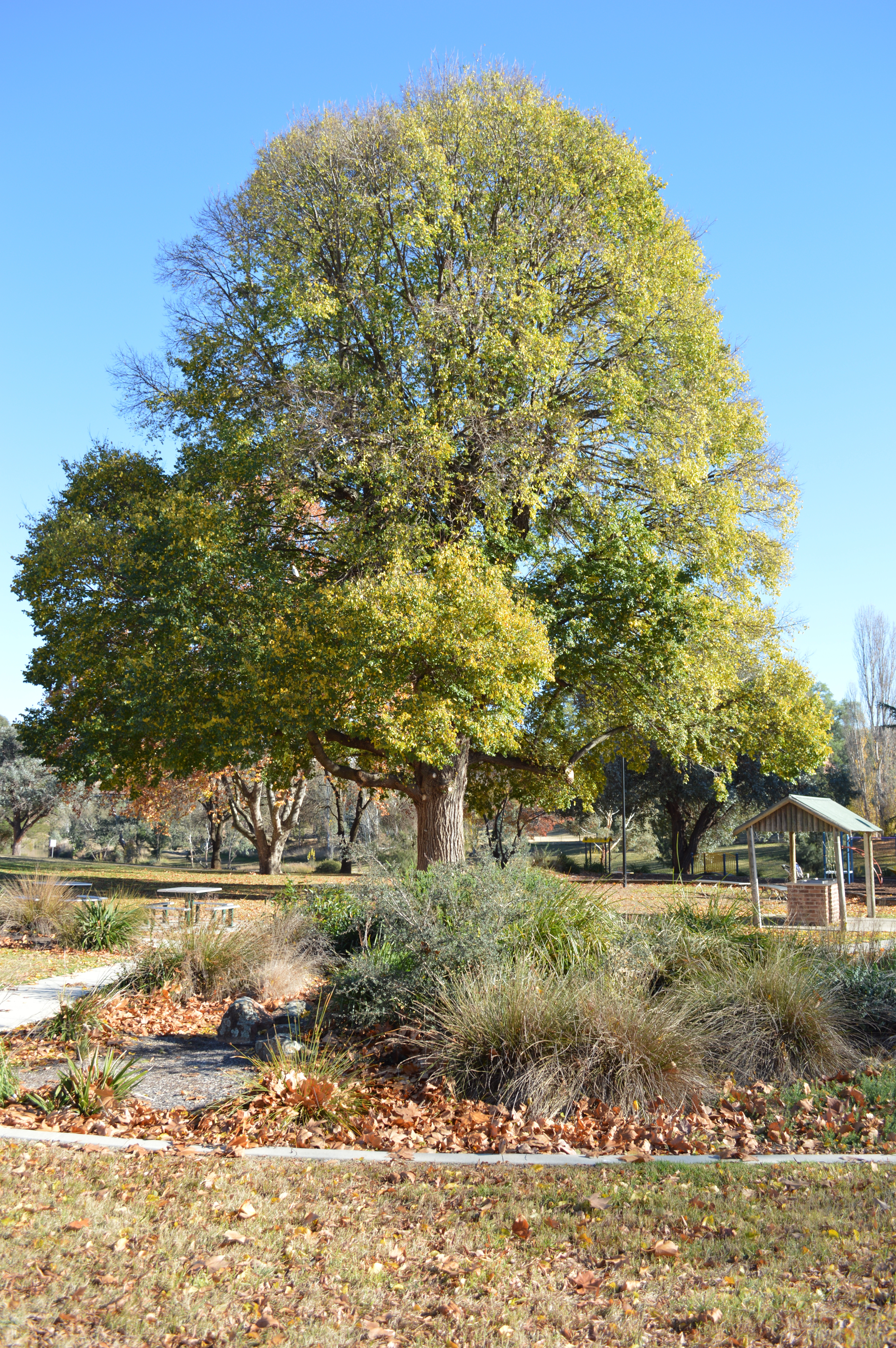
Field elm in Riverside Park, Yass, New South Wales

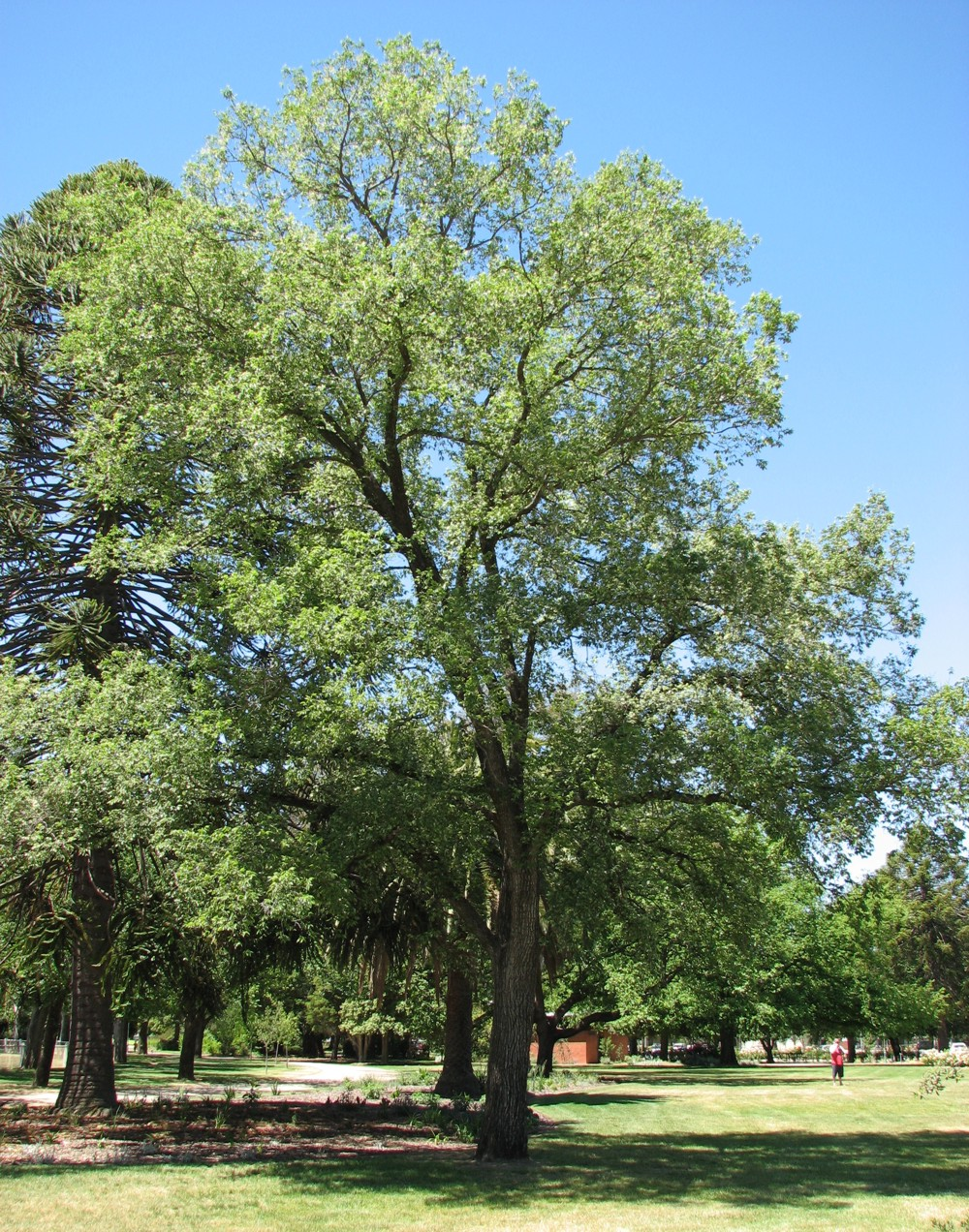
Silver elm in Benalla Botanic Gardens.

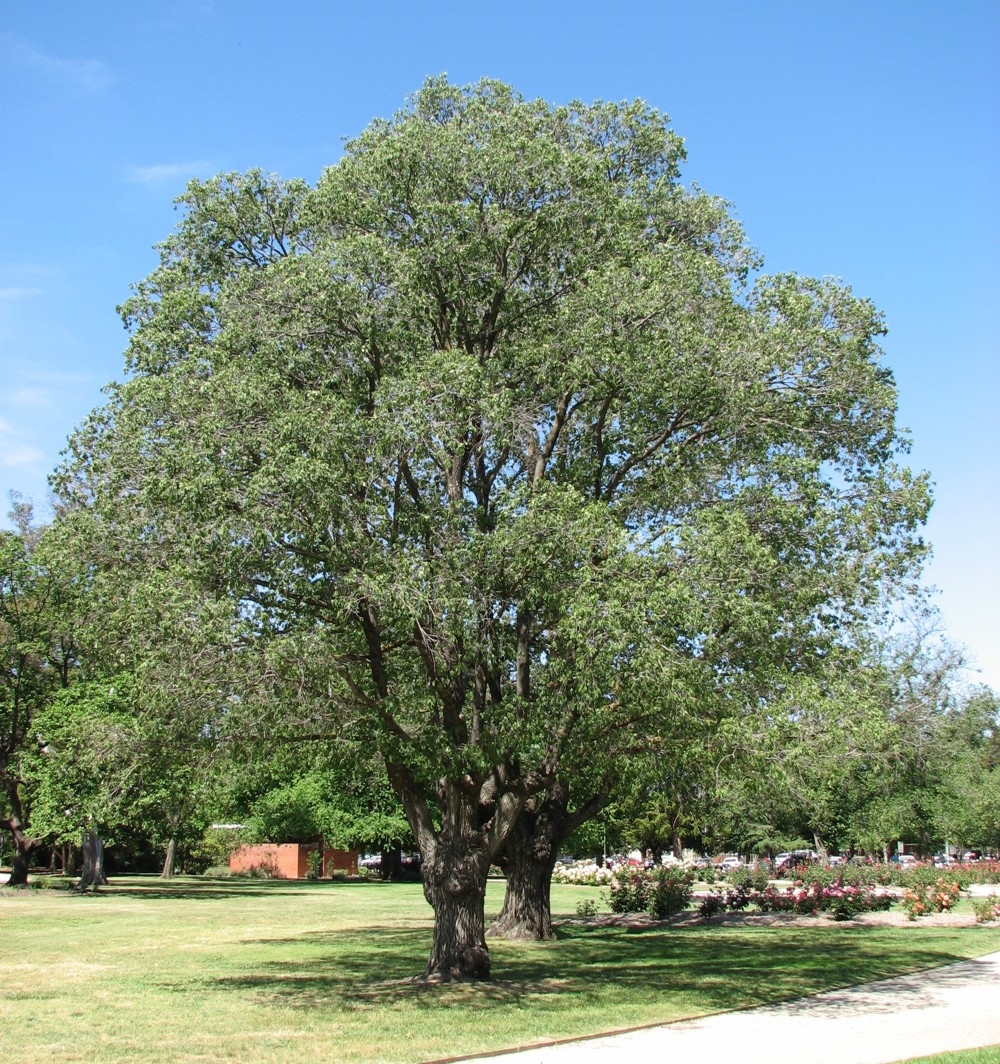
Two pollarded Ulmus minor 'Viminalis' in Benalla Botanic Gardens

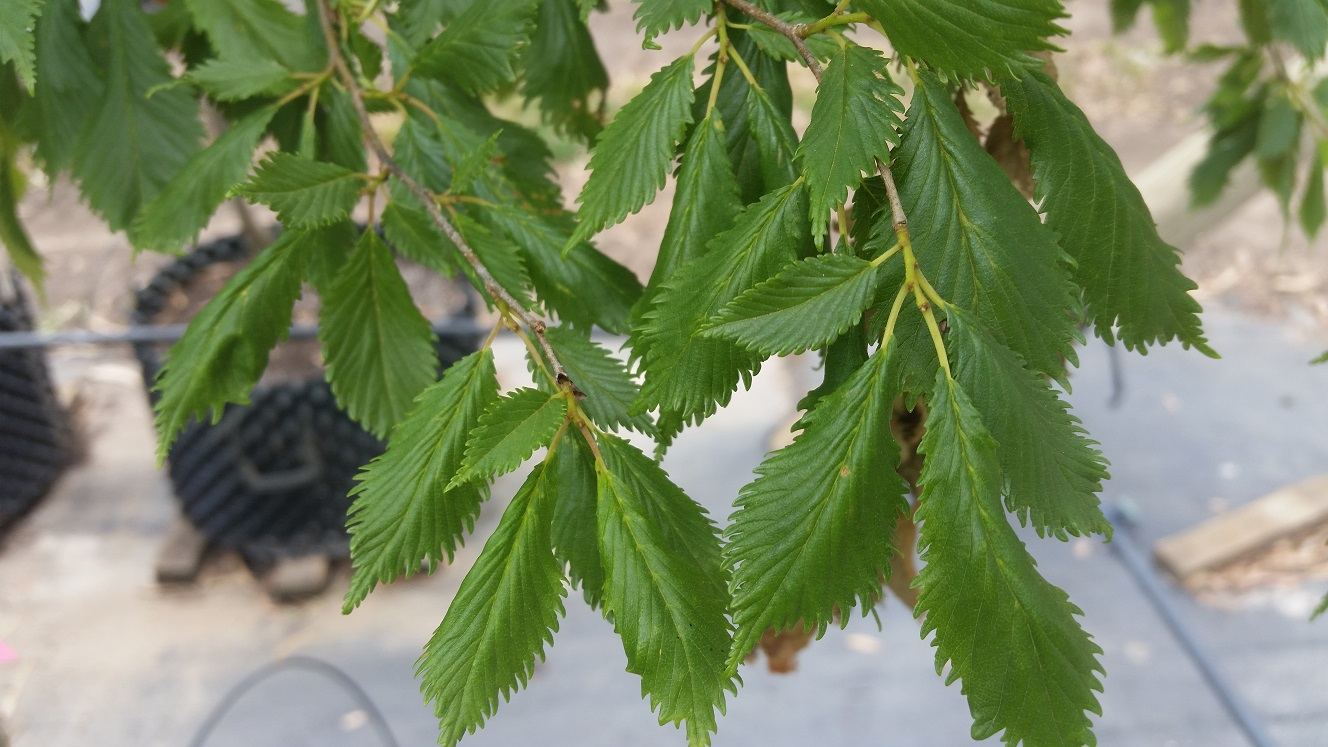
Foliage of 'Viminalis' saplings cloned from the tree in Lydiard St, Ballarat, Victoria

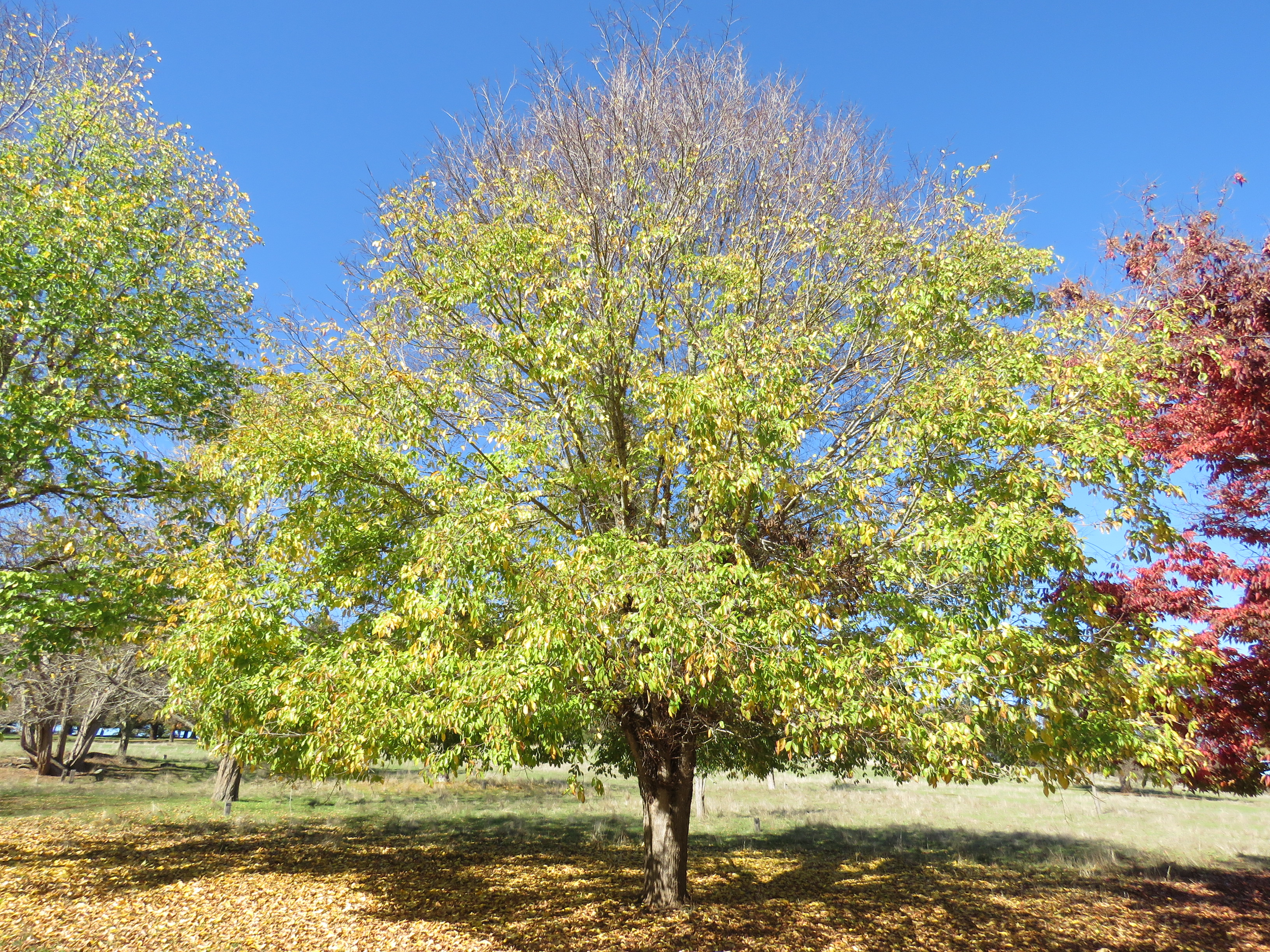
Ulmus carpinifolia in Golden Valley Tree Park, Western Australia, planted in 1994 (May 2022)

=== American elm ===
American elm (Ulmus americana) was recorded in nineteenth century plant catalogues, but the only known currently living specimens were obtained from the Yarralumla Nursery in Canberra in 1985. There is a heritage-listed avenue of American elm in Grant Crescent, Griffith, Australian Capital Territory.

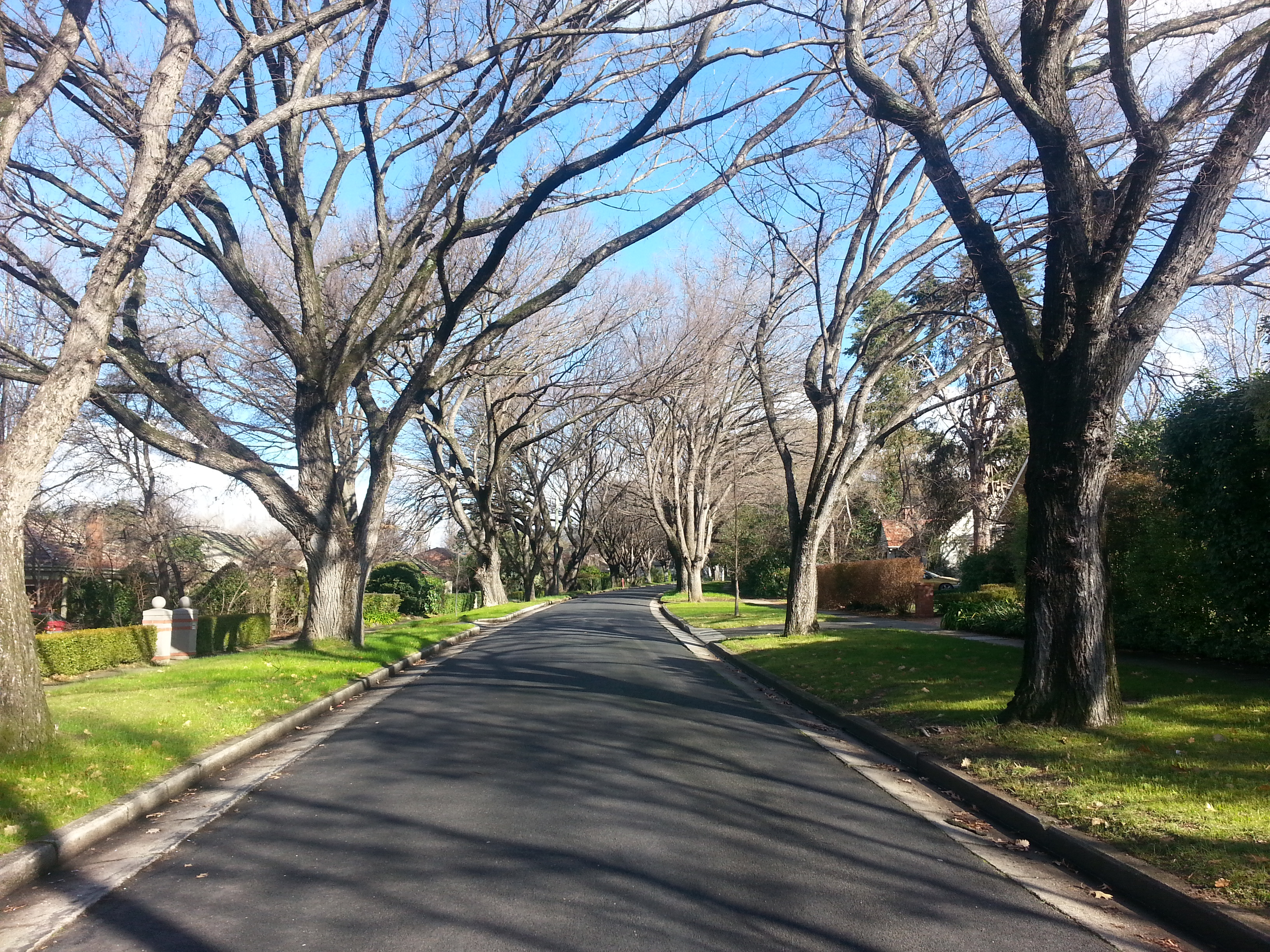
Ulmus americana avenue, Grant Crescent, Griffith, Australian Capital Territory

=== Other species and cultivars ===
A number of other species and cultivars have been introduced including Ulmus davidiana, U. glaucescens var. lasiocarpa, European white elm (Ulmus laevis), Mexican elm (U. mexicana), U. propinqua, Siberian elm (U. pumila), Himalayan elm (Ulmus wallichiana), and U. 'Jacqueline Hillier'. The cultivars 'Dovaei' and 'Louis van Houtte' were introduced to Australia but are rarely seen in cultivation. The hybrid cultivars 'Dodoens', 'Groeneveld', 'Lobel', 'Plantyn', 'Urban' and 'Sapporo Autumn Gold' were all imported into Australia from The Netherlands via New Zealand in 1986.

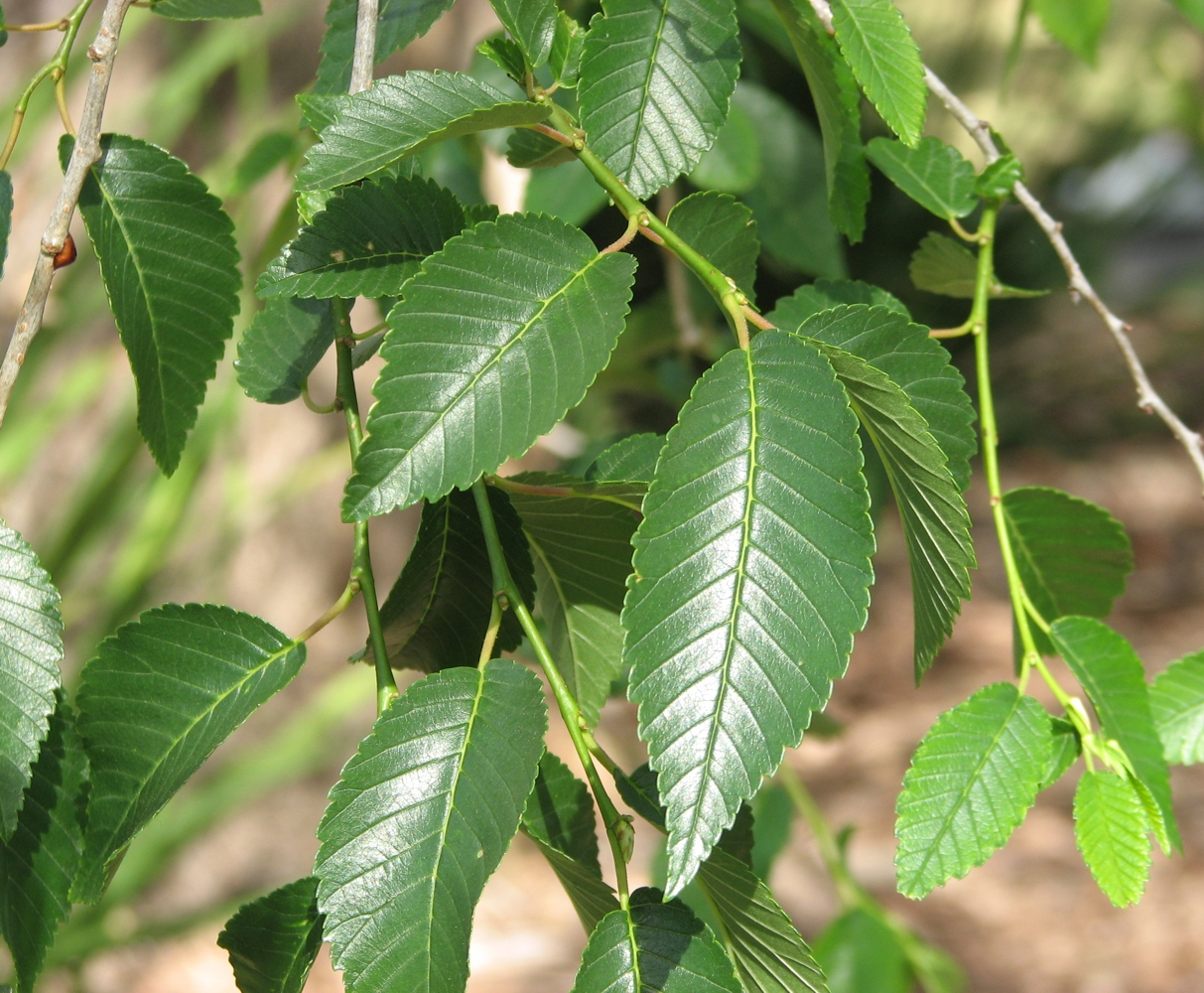
Foliage of Siberian elm in Alma Park, St Kilda, Victoria

== Cultivation ==
The history of elms in Australia extends back to at least 1803 when Governor King included them in a list of plants dispatched from England. In 1845 two elms, Ulmus campestris and Ulmus suberosa were listed in a nursery catalogue of James Dickson in Hobart. Historically, most planting of elms has occurred in south-eastern Australia, including the states of New South Wales, Victoria, Tasmania and South Australia.

The largest number of elm species are found in Victoria. The most common species found in older parks and gardens are the English elm and the Dutch elm. In Melbourne, boulevard plantings of elms were established from the latter half of the nineteenth century in Royal Parade, Victoria Parade and within the Fitzroy Gardens, and are registered as significant by the National Trust of Victoria. In many of the larger towns and cities in Victoria, the planting of elms in avenue plantings began to become popular in the late nineteenth century, a notable example being the 1876 planting in Finlay Avenue in Camperdown. Following World War I, Avenues of Honour were established to commemorate those who served and died. Although a variety of exotic species were utilised, the avenues at Ballarat (22 kilometres long), Bacchus Marsh, Creswick, Newstead, Wallan, Digby and Traralgon were either primarily or exclusively planted with English elm and Dutch elms. In 1997, there were 33,789 elms on council-controlled land within the state and the amount on private land was estimated to be at least as many. In 2005, the City of Melbourne recorded that it had 6300 elms in its parks and boulevards. In 1997 the amenity value of the elms in Melbourne's boulevards was estimated to be $39 million.

In New South Wales, elms are predominantly found in Bowral, Orange, Bathurst, Wagga Wagga and Albury. They have also widely planted in Canberra. In Tasmania many older towns in the Midlands and around the eastern coast such as Hobart Launceston, Ross, Port Arthur have plantings in parks and gardens. South Australia's elms are found in the Barossa Valley and Mount Gambier in the various Botanic Gardens. Elms are relatively uncommon in Western Australia and Queensland.

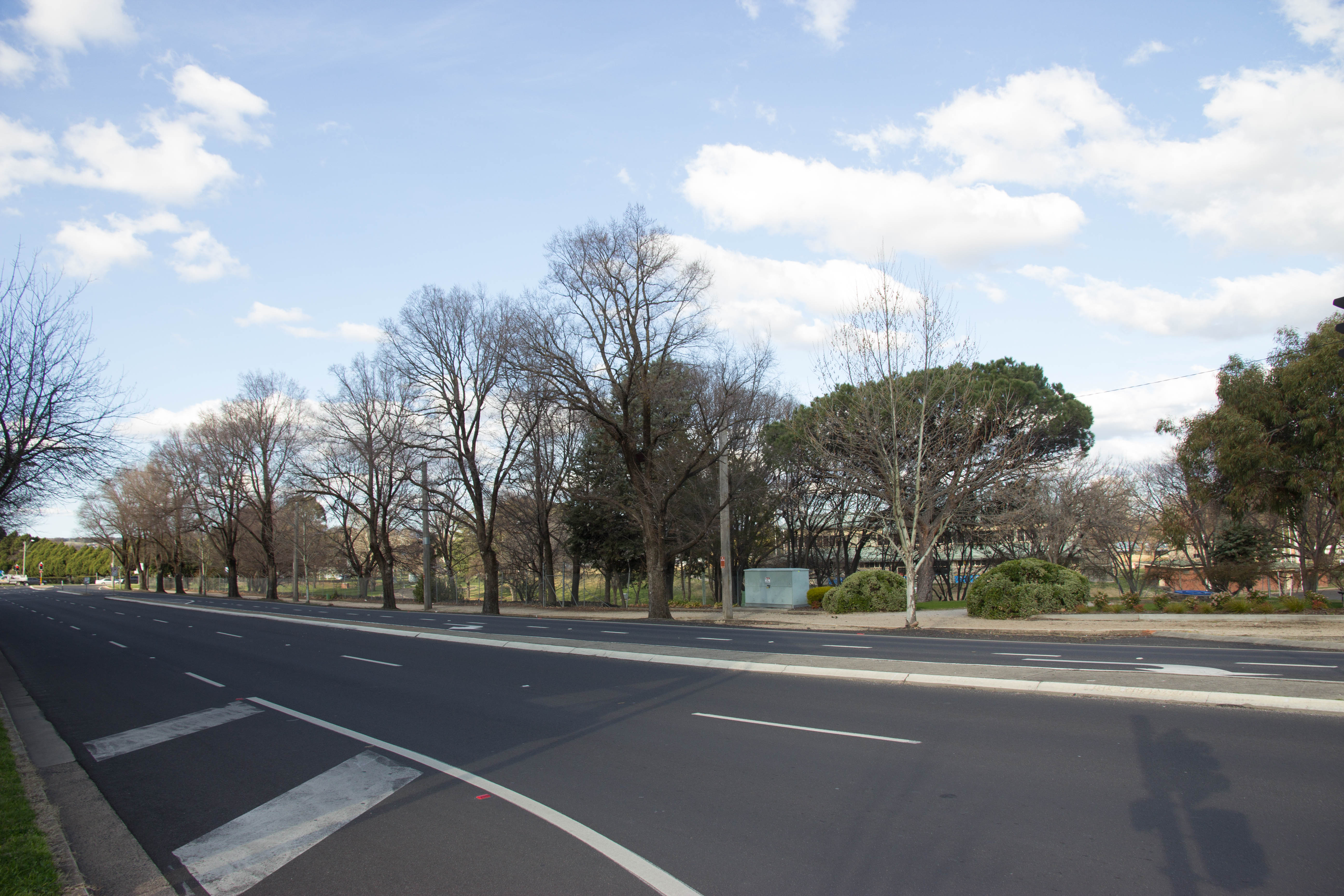
Heritage-listed Bentick Street elms, Bathurst, New South Wales (late winter 2018); planted c.1900

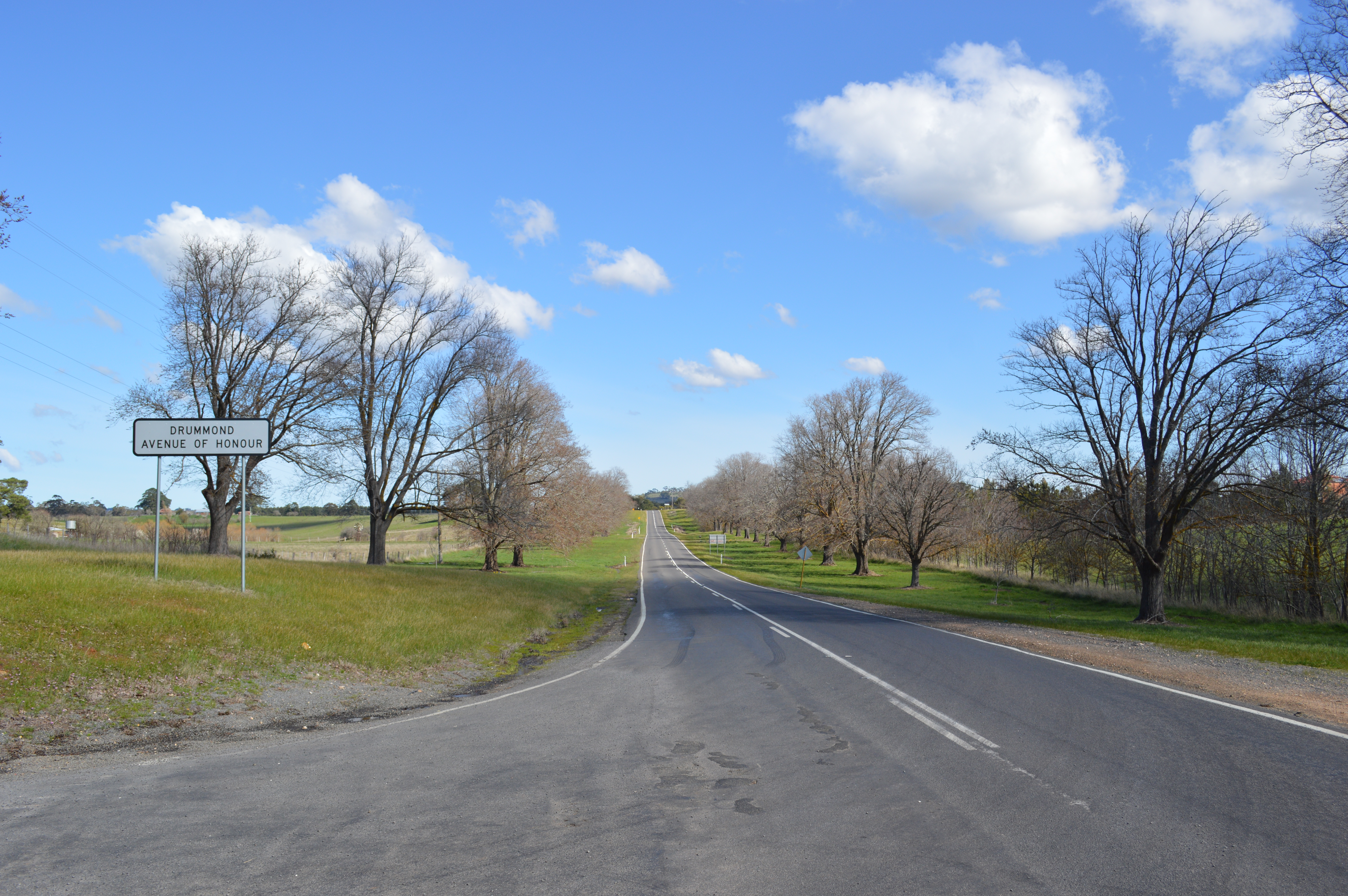
Elms planted in 1930 in the Drummond Avenue of Honour, Drummond, Victoria (2013)

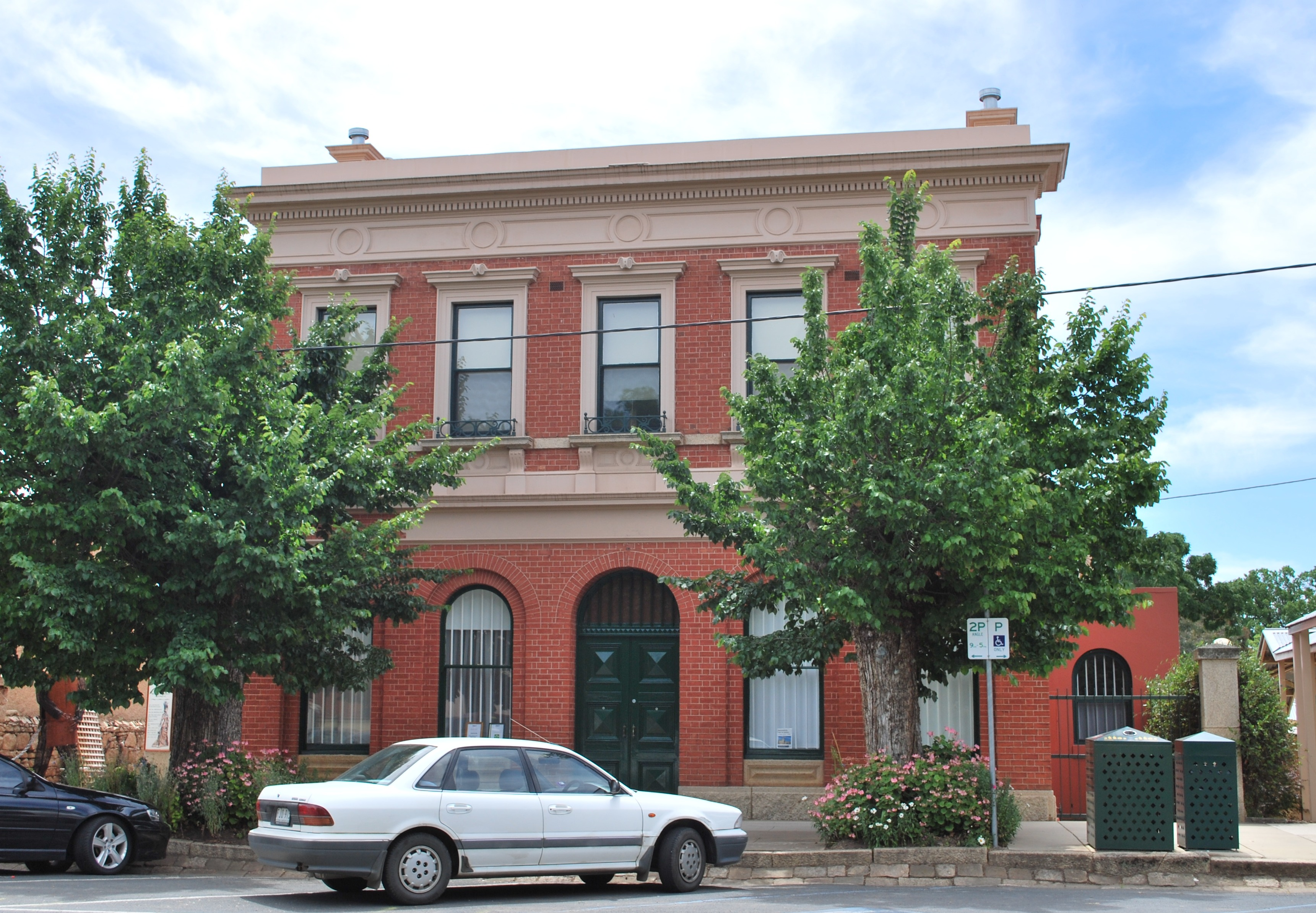
Pollard elms, Beechworth, Victoria (2009)

=== Hybridisation ===
The extent to which elms in Australia have been propagated by seed rather than by cloning is unclear, but it is known that hybrids of the Ulmus hollandica group do not usually come true to "type" if grown from seed. Melbourne Botanic Gardens was able to raise seedlings from the "few" viable seeds of an old 'English elm' in the collection, producing "highly variable" offspring. "This seedling variation," wrote Roger Spencer (Horticultural Flora of South-Eastern Australia, 1995), "suggests one possible source of the variation to be found in these trees ['English elm'] in Australia." In addition, "Chance hybridisation has resulted in a mix of elms rather different from that in England". Melville believed that there were Ulmus procera × Ulmus minor hybrids present in Victoria.

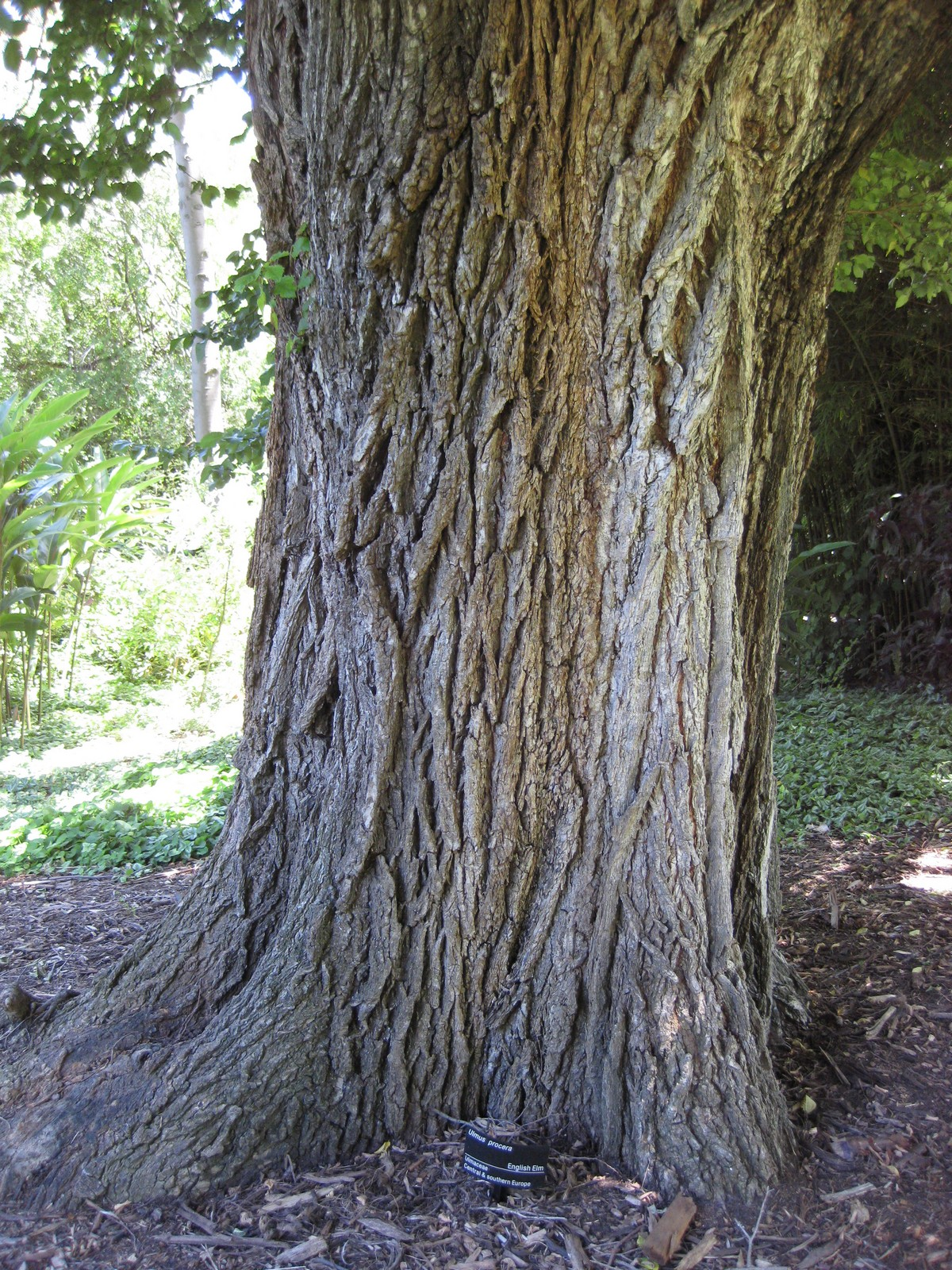
Elm labelled Ulmus procera, Royal Botanic Gardens Melbourne, with bark not typical of the UK English elm clone (2010)

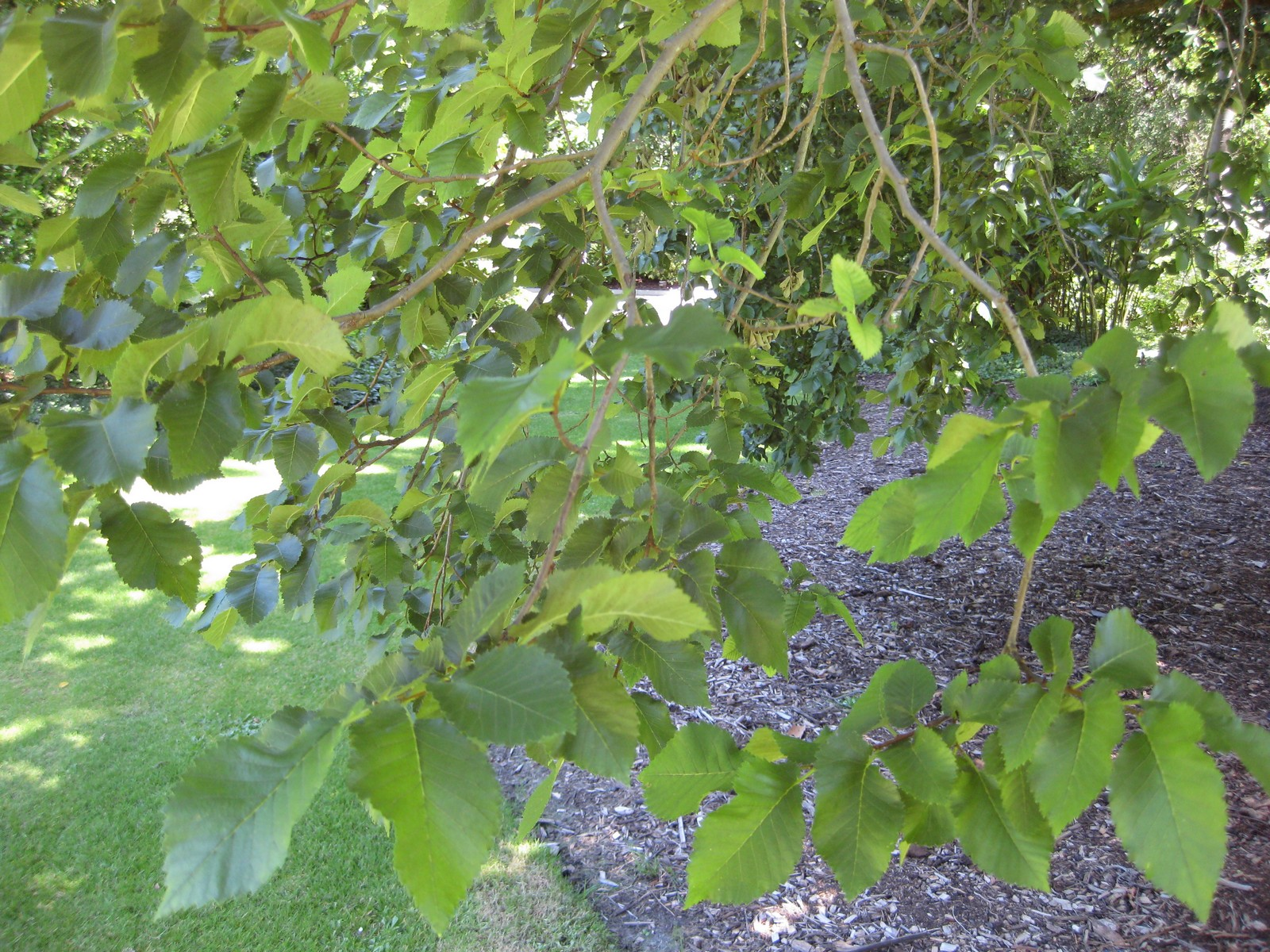
Ulmus procera, RBG Melbourne, with leaves not typical of the UK English elm clone (2010)

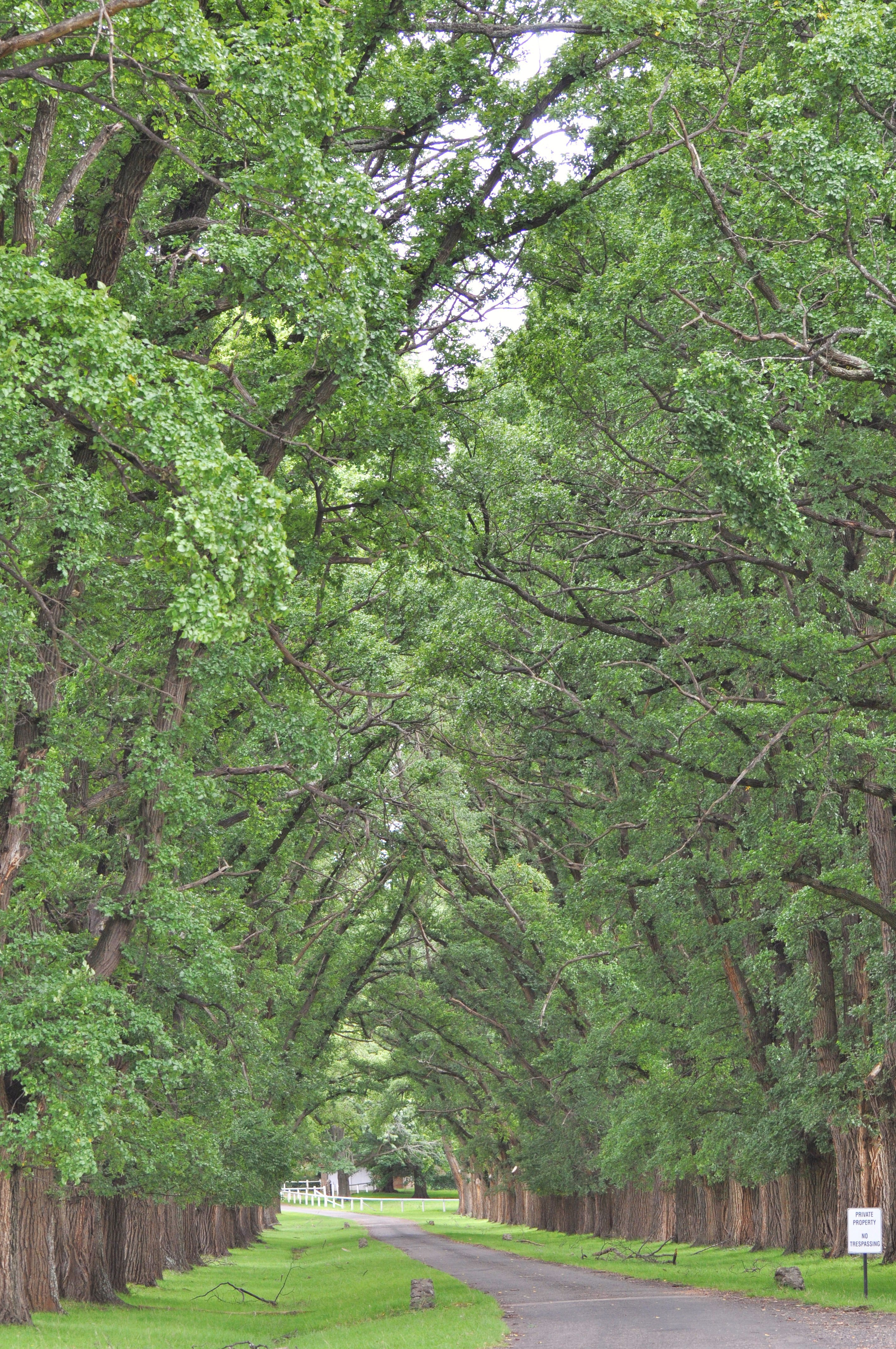
Avenue of elms, Gostwyck, near Uralla, New South Wales, called 'English elms' but with vertically grooved, not plated, bark

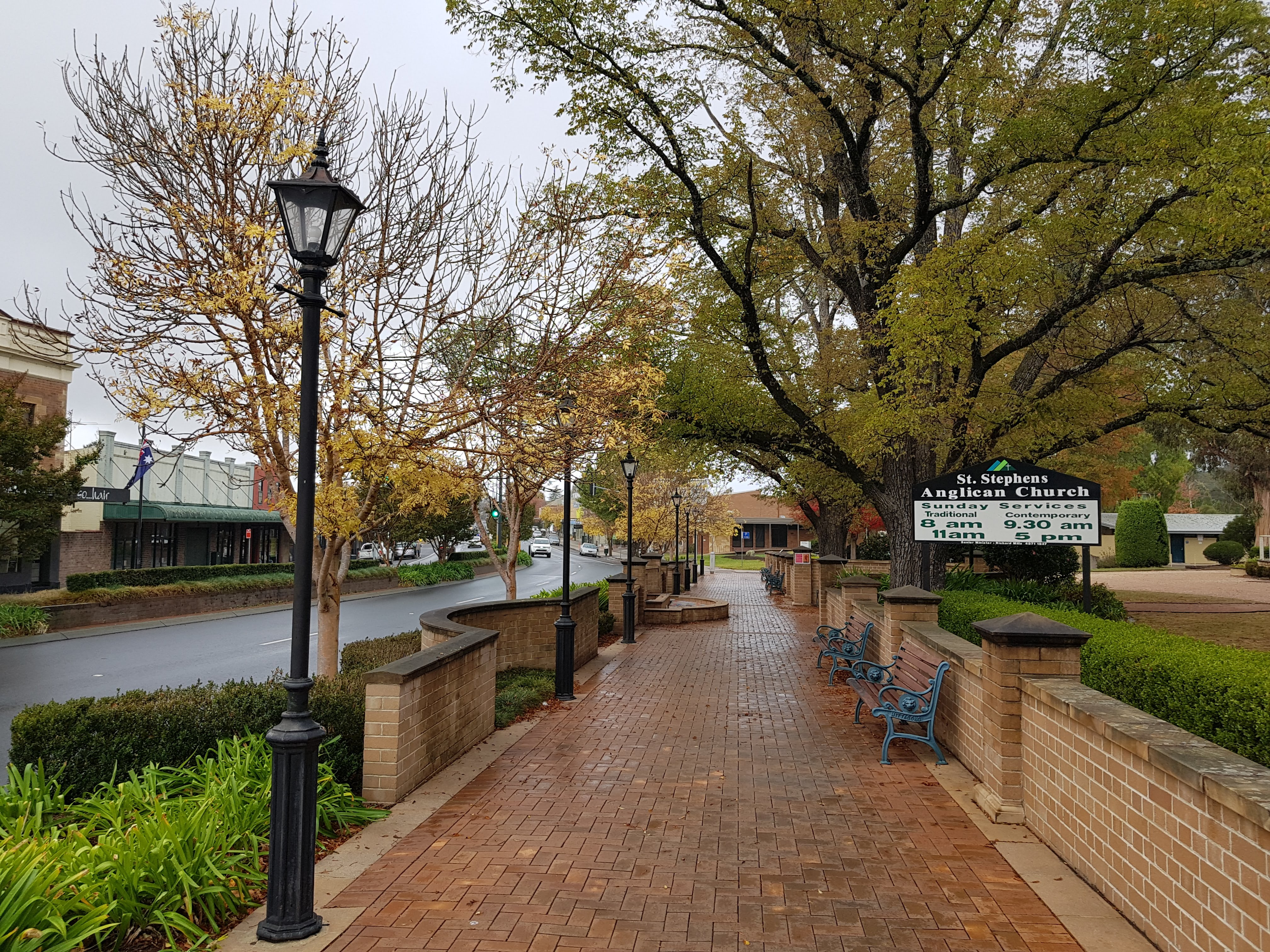
Elms supplied as 'Cornubiensis' but not type-'Stricta', St. Stephen's Church, Mittagong, NSW

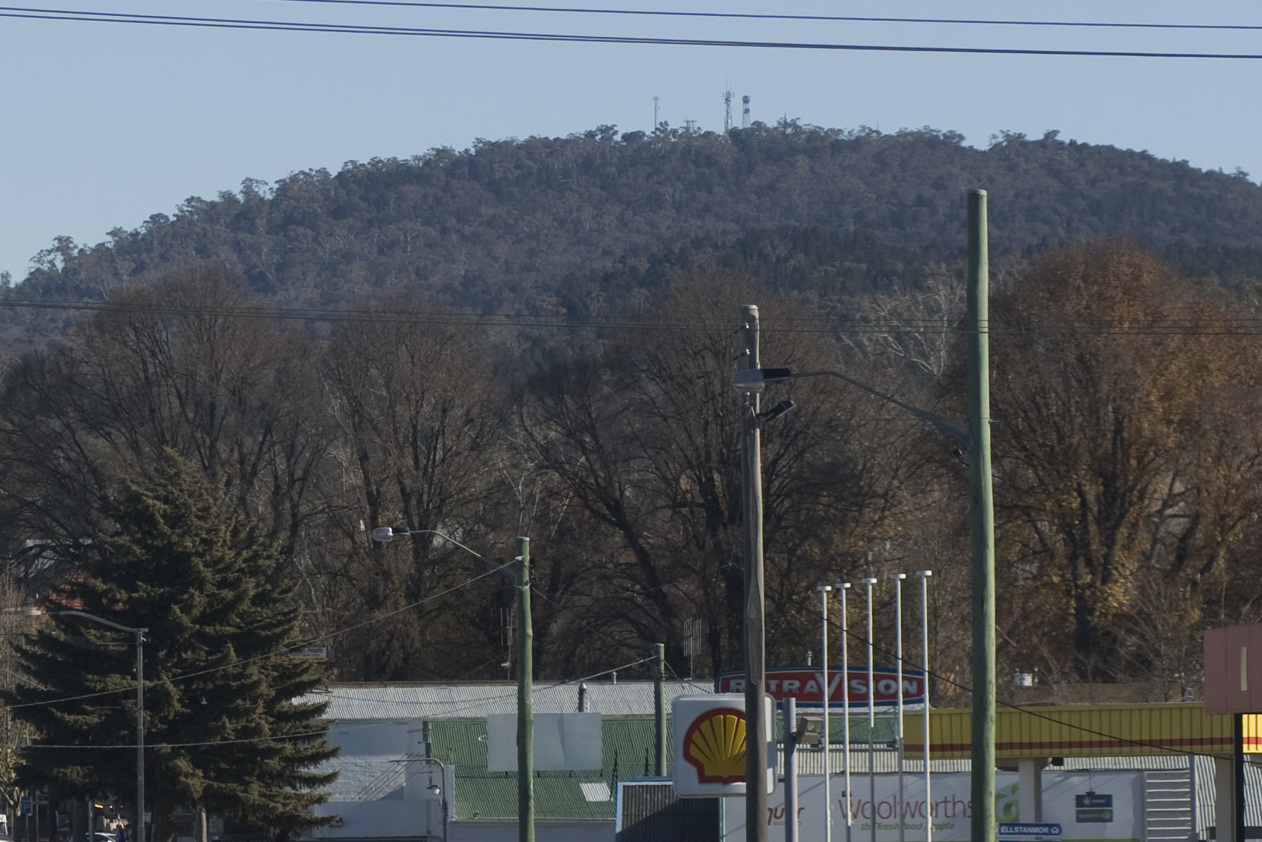
Unidentified Ulmus x hollandica cultivar, Bombala Street, Cooma, NSW

== Naturalisation ==
A number of elm species have become naturalised, predominantly in localised areas. Dutch elm has become naturalised in South Australia, Queensland, New South Wales, the ACT, Victoria, and Tasmania, Chinese elm in Queensland, New South Wales (including the Kosciuszko National Park) and Victoria, and Ulmus minor in the ACT. English elm is naturalised in South Australia and Victoria and has been recorded as naturalised in Porongurup National Park in Western Australia in 1987 and also in Armidale and Wollombi in New South Wales.

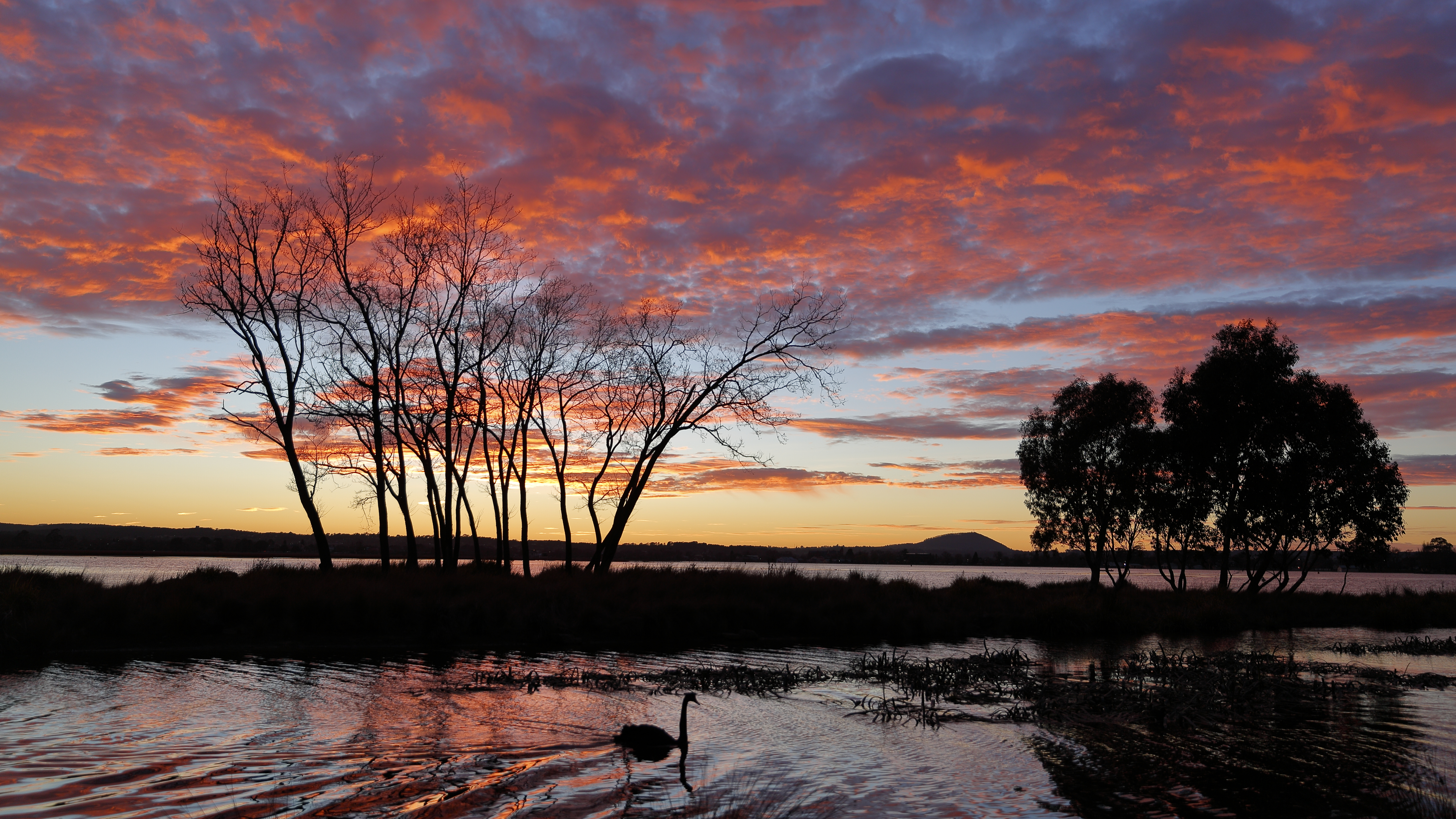
Self-seeded elms, Lake Wendouree, Ballarat (2017)

== Pests and diseases ==
Although elms in Australia exist far away from their natural habitat and associated pest and disease problems, a few problematic insect species have managed to infiltrate Australia's strict quarantine defences . The elm leaf beetle was first discovered on the Mornington Peninsula in 1989 and had spread to the City of Melbourne by 1991. The beetles have caused significant damage to elm species since that time, although the City of Melbourne keeps them in check with a regular spraying regime. Another less serious insect pest is the elm tree leafhopper, which causes speckling of leaves resulting in a silvery appearance.

Unlike most other countries that have elm trees, Australia has not yet been subjected to Dutch elm disease, although the vector of the disease, the elm bark beetle, was first officially recorded in Melbourne in 1974. The City of Melbourne and the Victorian State Government have jointly developed a Dutch elm disease contingency plan in case of an outbreak.

Other diseases include Bacterial Wetwood, various viral and fungal diseases, cankers including Coral Spot, and root diseases caused by cinnamon fungus or honey fungus.

== Raising community awareness ==
The Friends of the Elms (FOTE), is a voluntary not-for-profit organisation which was founded in 1990 for the purpose of raising awareness of the importance of elms and assisting to fund research into the potential threats of pests and disease. FOTE is dedicated to raising community awareness of the threats to Australia’s elms, and assisting individuals and local councils in the recording and monitoring of elm trees on both public and private land. FOTE also raises funds to support research into ways to combat insect attack, elm leaf beetle, and prevent the spread of Dutch elm disease if it arrives in Australia. It encourages the public to register elm trees that they see around their neighbourhood. Once an elm tree has been positively identified, it is added to the National Register of Elms.

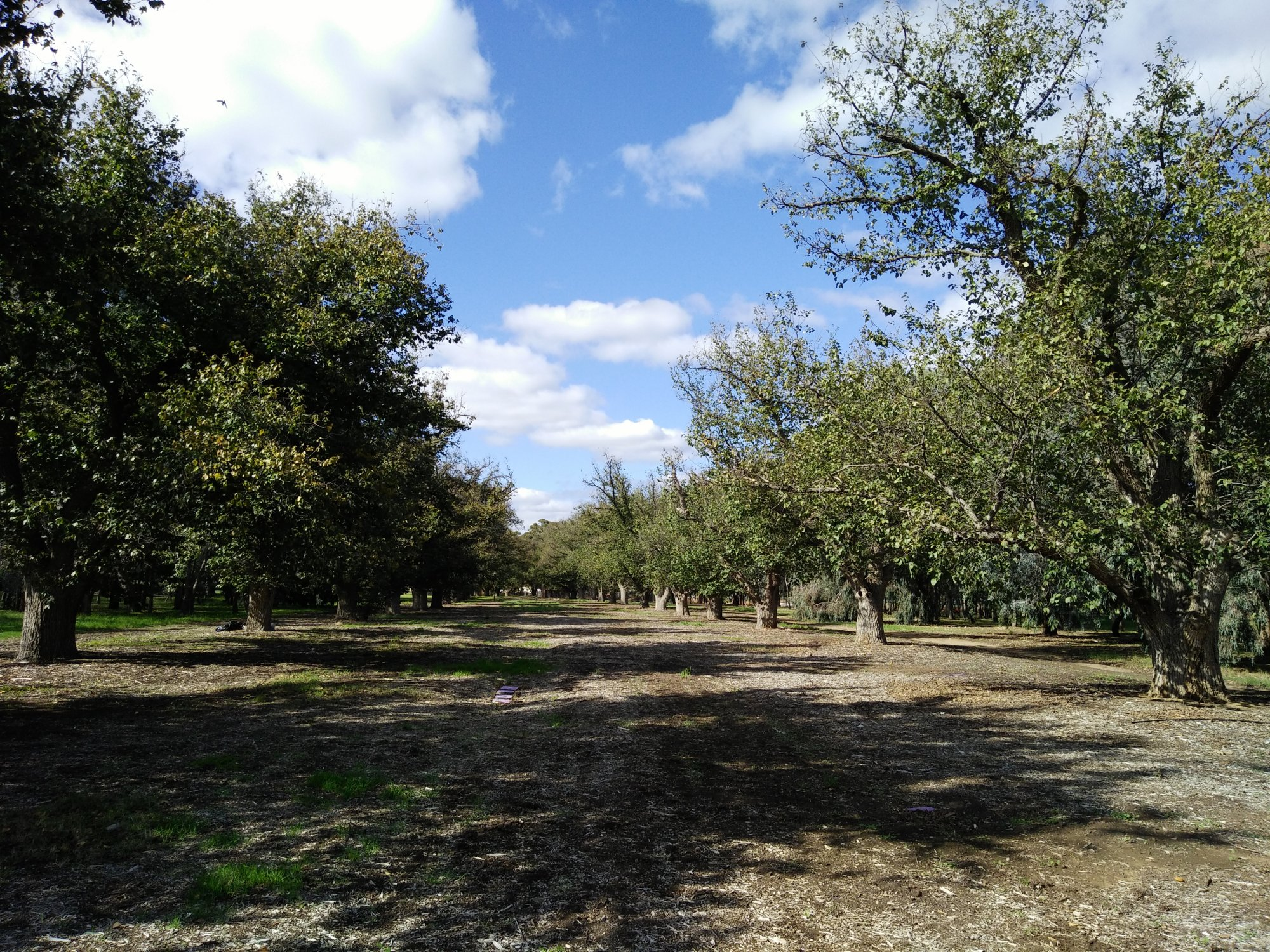
The elm carriageway in South Park Lands, Adelaide, South Australia

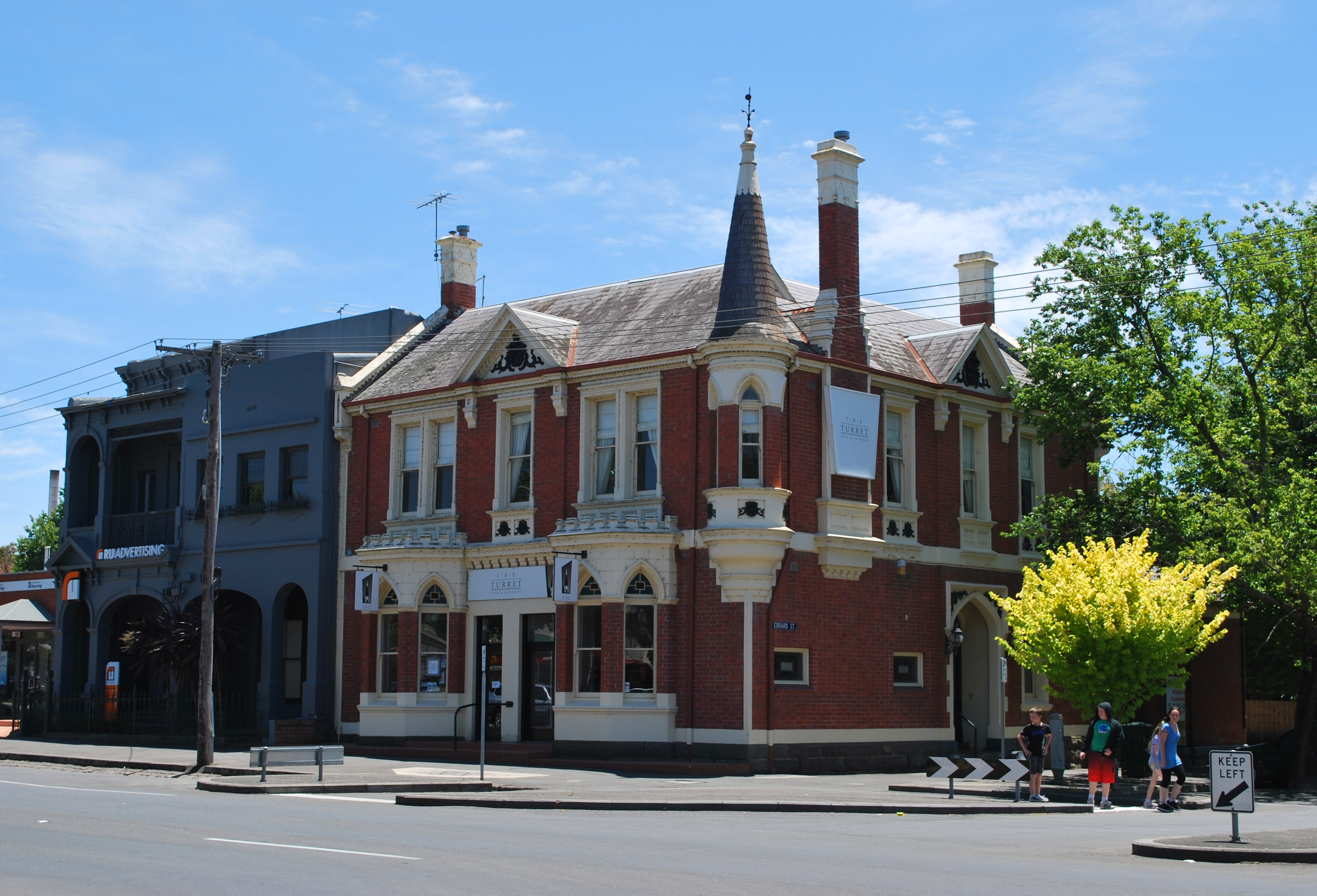
Young golden elm, (Ulmus glabra 'Lutescens') in Ballarat, Victoria

== Reading ==
- Spencer, Roger, ed., Horticultural Flora of South-Eastern Australia, Vol. 2 (Sydney, 1995), Ulmus, p. 103-118
- Brookes, Margaret, & Barley, Richard, Plants listed in nursery catalogues in Victoria, 1855-1889 (Ornamental Plant Collection Association, South Yarra, Victoria, 1992), p.303–304
