= Ulmus minor 'Dicksonii' =

Elm cultivar

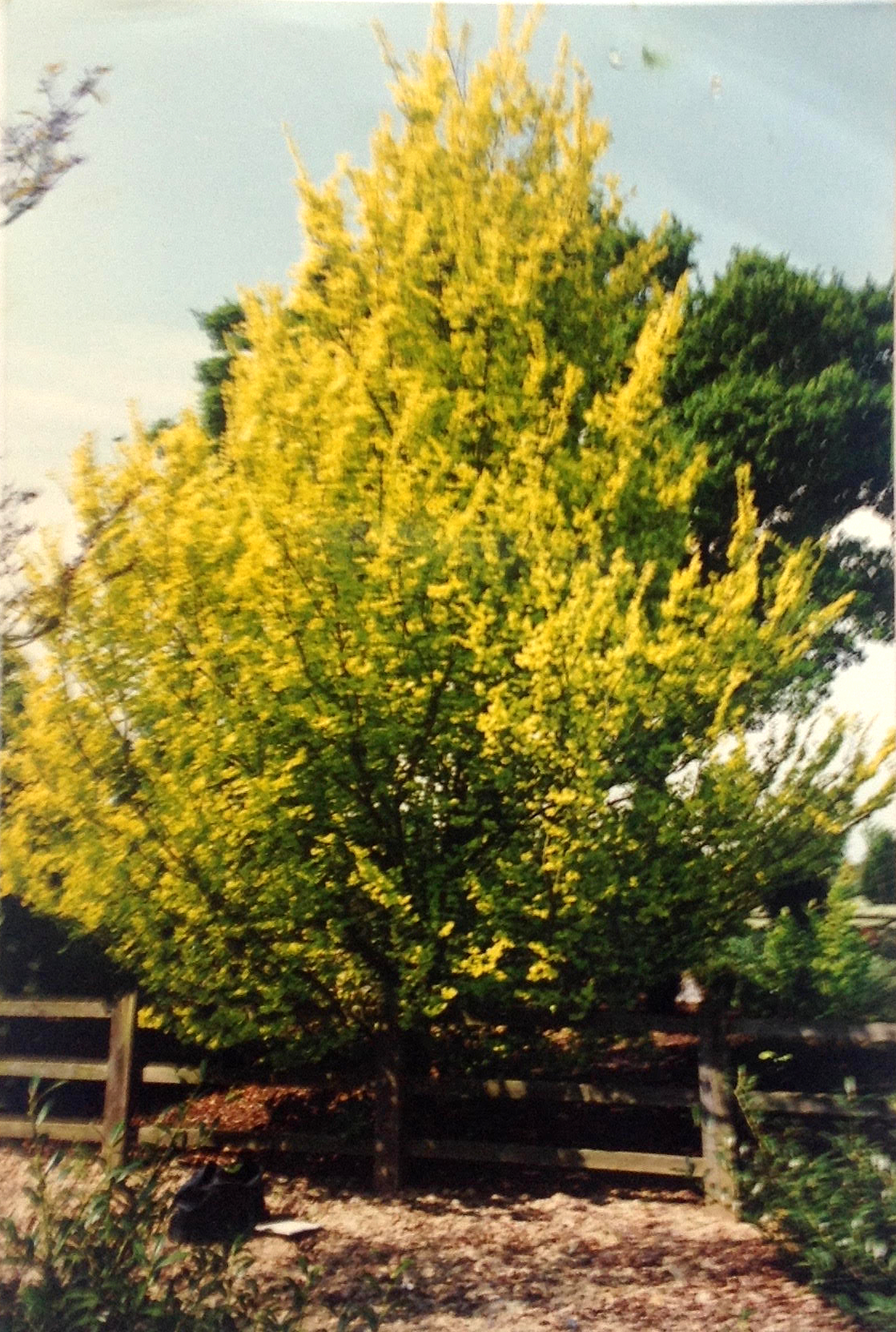
- Dickson's Golden Elm, Sir Harold Hillier Gardens, 1990
- Species: Ulmus minor
- Cultivar: 'Dicksonii'
- Origin: England

The Field Elm cultivar Ulmus minor 'Dicksonii', commonly known as Dickson's Golden Elm, is a yellow-leaved tree raised in Chester in 1900 by Dickson's Nursery, which distributed it from the autumn of 1907 as 'Golden Cornish Elm'. 'Cornish Elm' was the name often given in error to Guernsey or Wheatley Elm by the local authorities who planted the latter extensively, an error which may have influenced the choice of name by Dickson's nursery. 'Dicksonii' is usually listed as a variety of Guernsey Elm rather than Cornish Elm, Bean giving 'Wheatleyi Aurea' as a synonym, and Hillier 'Sarniensis Aurea' and later U. × sarniensis 'Dicksonii'. Clibrans' nursery of Altrincham, however, described it (1922) as otherwise identical "in habit and constitution" to 'type' Cornish Elm (the nursery marketed Guernsey Elm as 'Wheatleyii'). The Späth nursery of Berlin distributed it from c.1913 as U. campestris cornubiensis Dicksonii. The nursery Messieurs Otin père et fils of Saint-Étienne sold an Ulmus Wheatleyi aurea pyramidalis, with leaves marbled yellow, in 1882, earlier than Dickson's introduction.

Not to be confused with more common cultivars named 'Golden Elm' – 'Wredei', 'Lutescens' and 'Louis van Houtte'.

== Description ==
A slow growing tree, variously described as "of free and upright growth", "resembling Cornish Elm in form", and "conical and of dense habit". The leaves are "a fine yellow colour, said to last till autumn", though specimens in the north appear to colour less well (see gallery). A photograph of 'Dicksonii' was published in the Royal Horticultural Society's Gardeners' Encyclopedia of Plants and Flowers (1989).

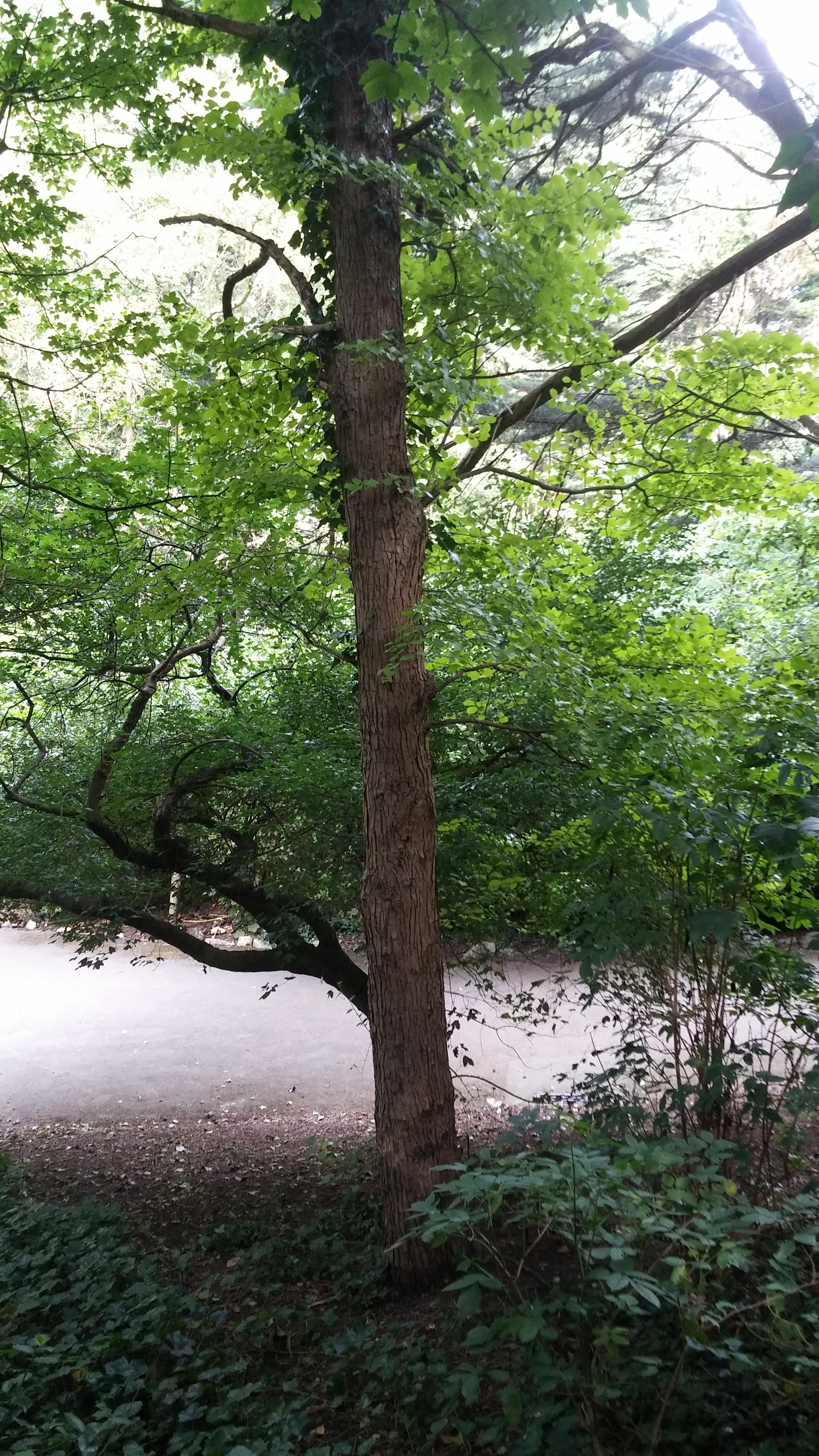
Trunk of reverted 'Dicksonii', Peasholm Park, Scarborough

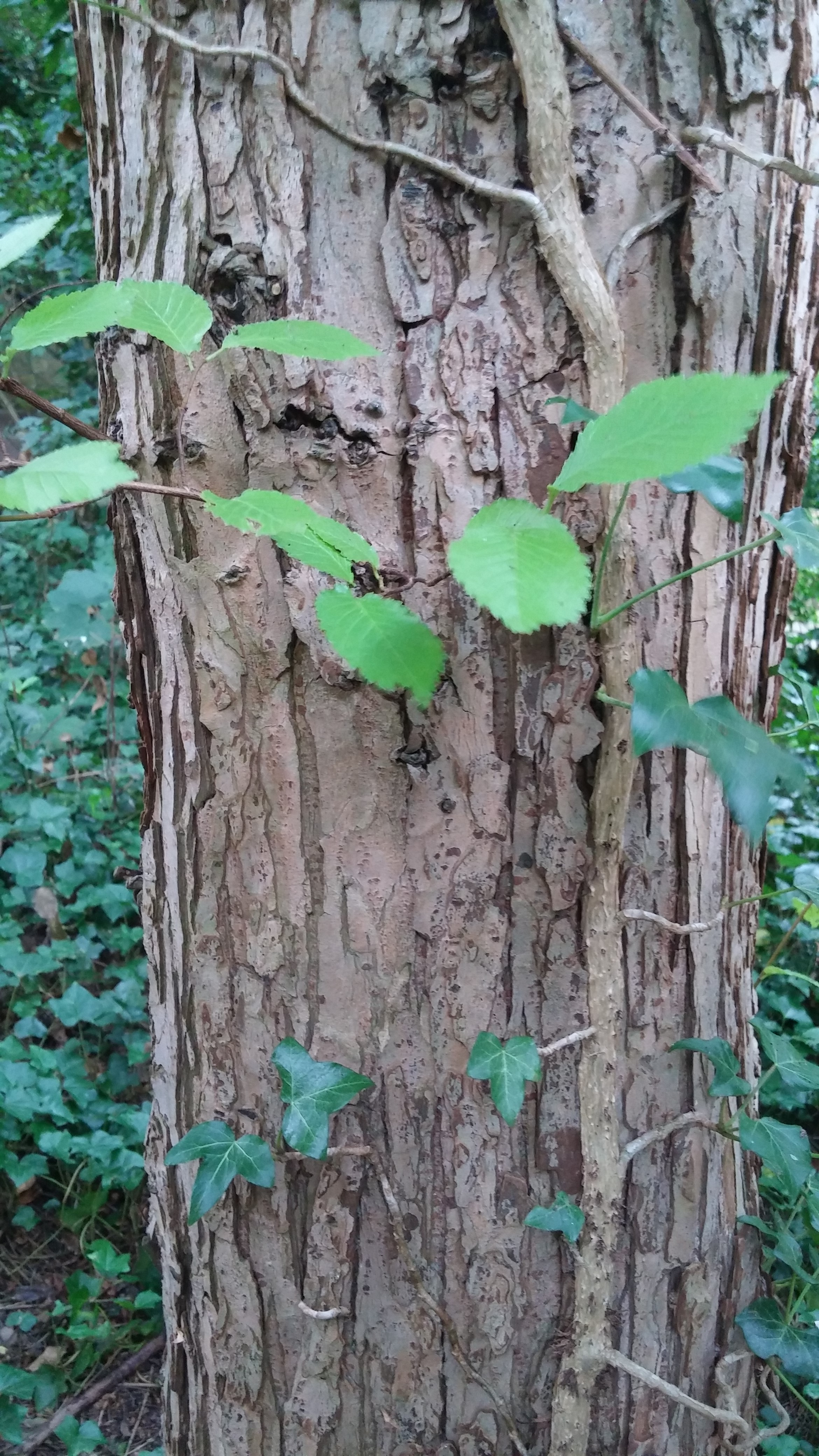
Bark of 'Dicksonii'

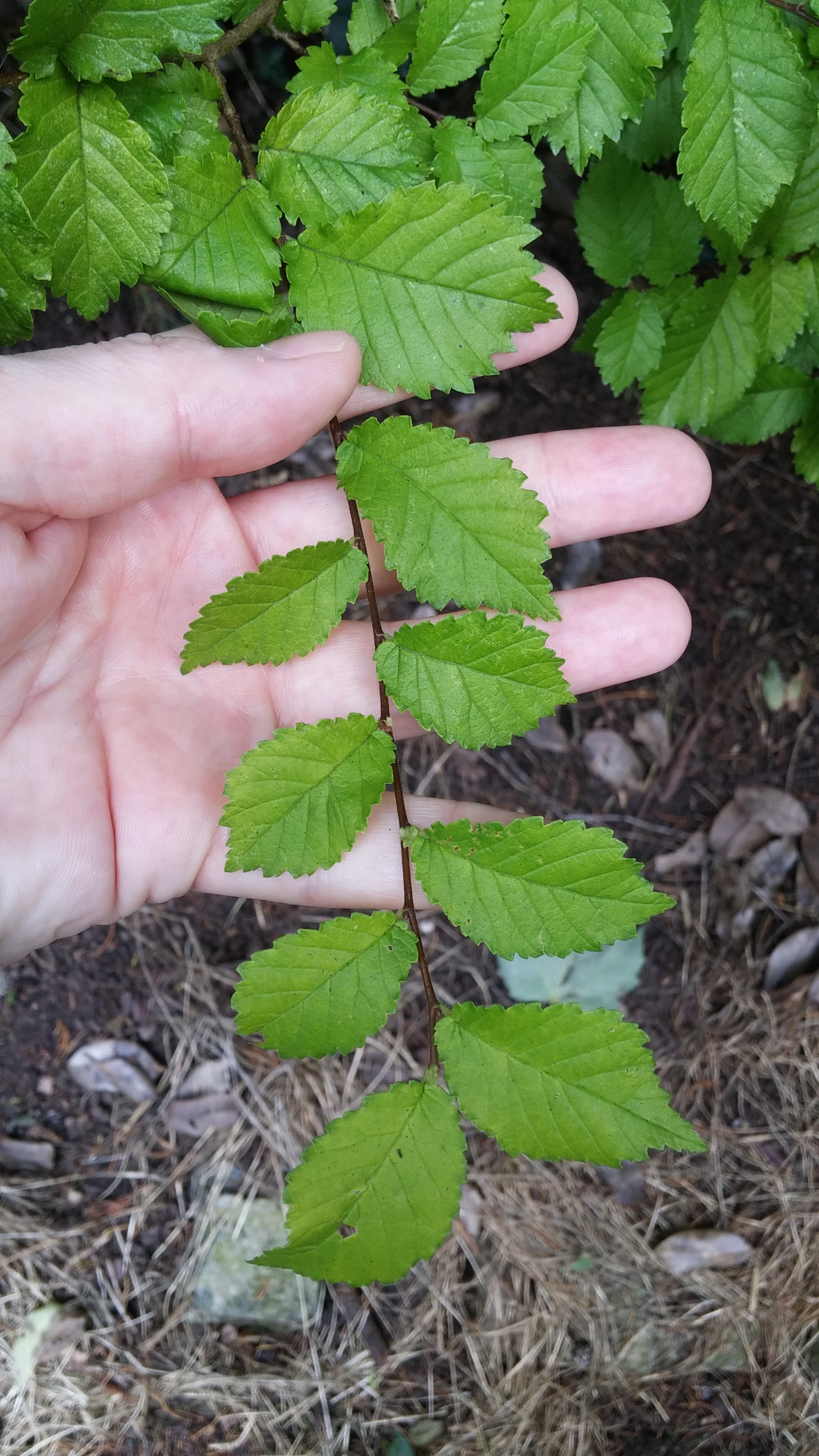
Leaves of 'Dicksonii' reverted to green

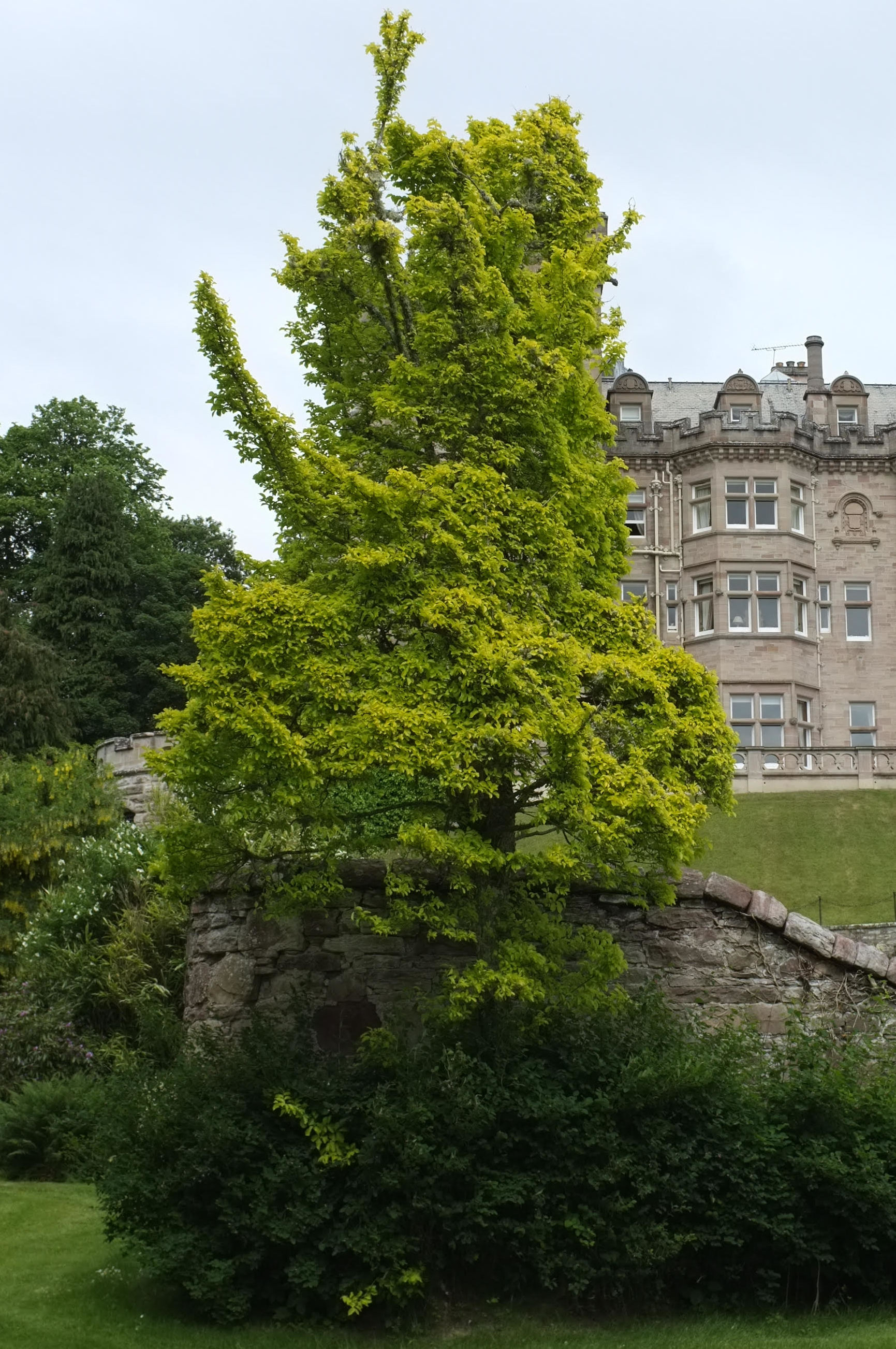
'Dicksonii', Skibo Castle, Sutherland

== Pests and diseases ==
'Dicksonii' is susceptible to Dutch elm disease.

== Cultivation ==
In 1969 the Royal Horticultural Society granted Guernsey Elm, "and its sport 'Dickson's Golden Elm'", an Award of Garden Merit (AGM), "in recognition of its attractive form and garden worthiness".

The horticulturalist Christopher Lloyd used 'Dickson's Golden Elm' in his herbaceous borders at Great Dixter Gardens, Northiam, East Sussex. Though he gave 'Dampieri Aurea' as a synonym, photographs suggest that the cultivar planted was 'Dicksonii'.

82 were planted (as Ulmus stricta Wheatleyi aurea) on the boulevard to Long Eaton district boundary before 1939 to commemorate the coronation of King George VI. One example was planted at Pyrford Court, Woking, Surrey before 1985.

'Dicksonii' is now very rare in the UK.

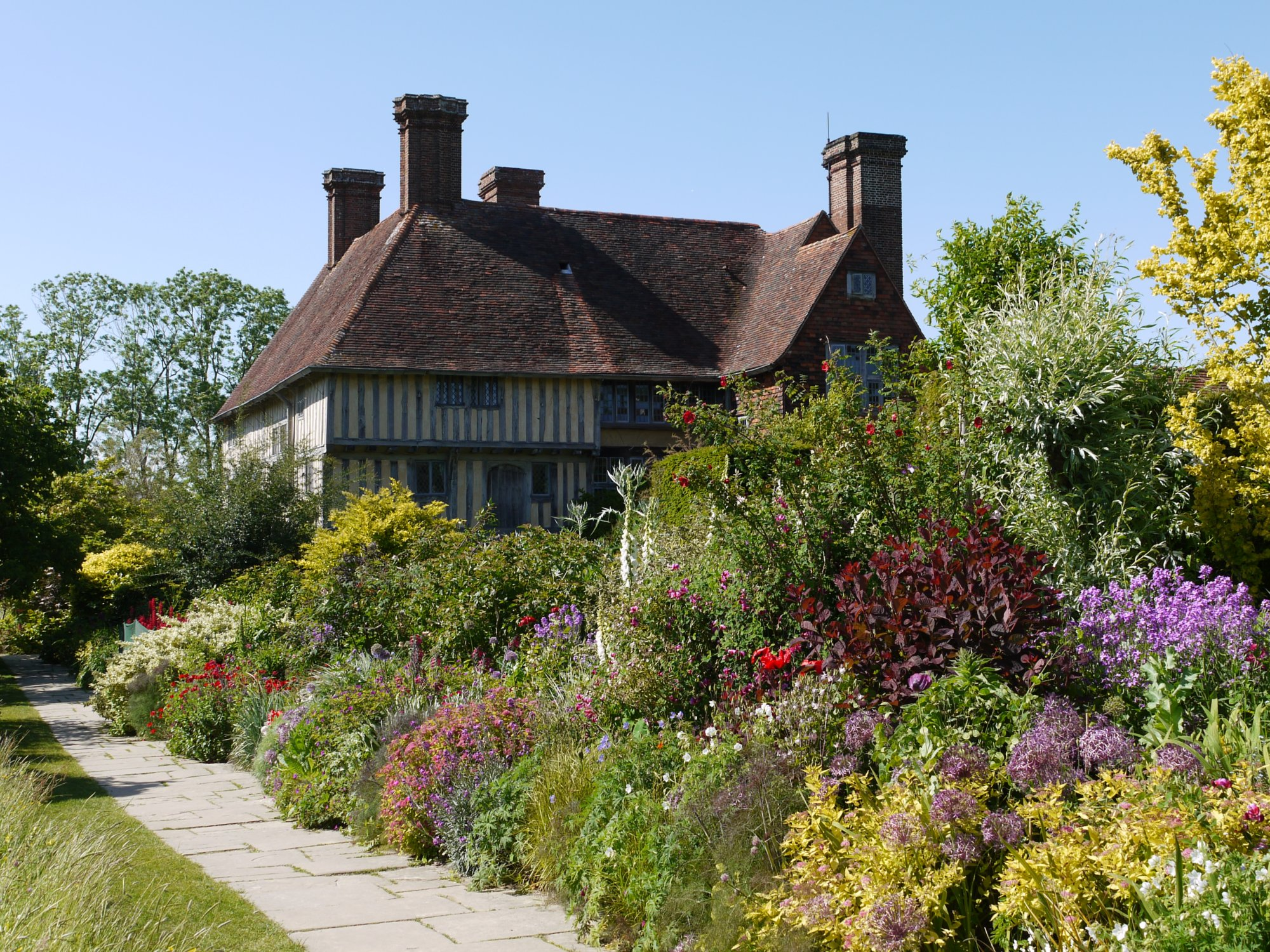
The Long Border at Great Dixter, Sussex, with 'Dicksonii' to right (2014)

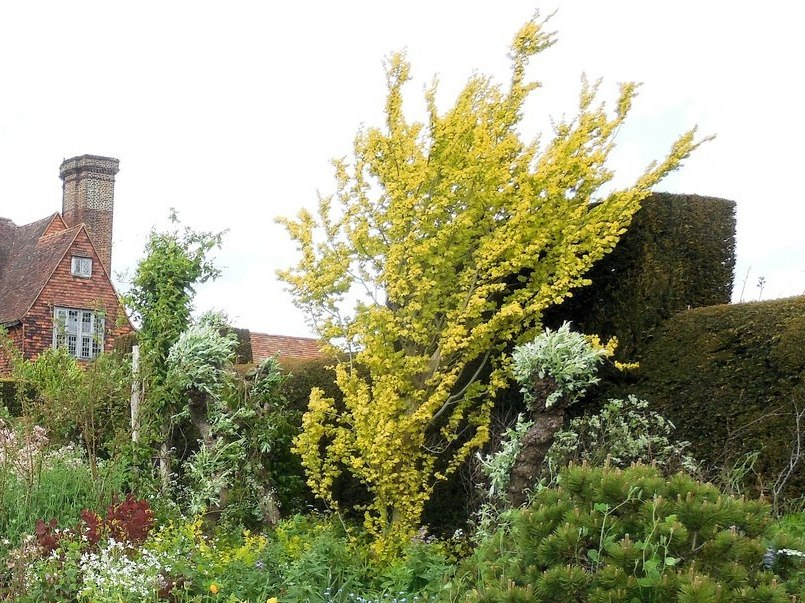
'Dicksonii' in the Long Border, Great Dixter (2014)

== Notable trees ==
Among the few survivors in the UK are a tall, close-grown specimen beside Durham Cathedral (2017), and two in Peasholm Park, Scarborough, North Yorkshire, rediscovered in 1994 during a National Tree Register audit of the trees in Peasholm Glen. Another specimen stands in Bocombe Mill Cottage Garden, near Parkham, Devon.

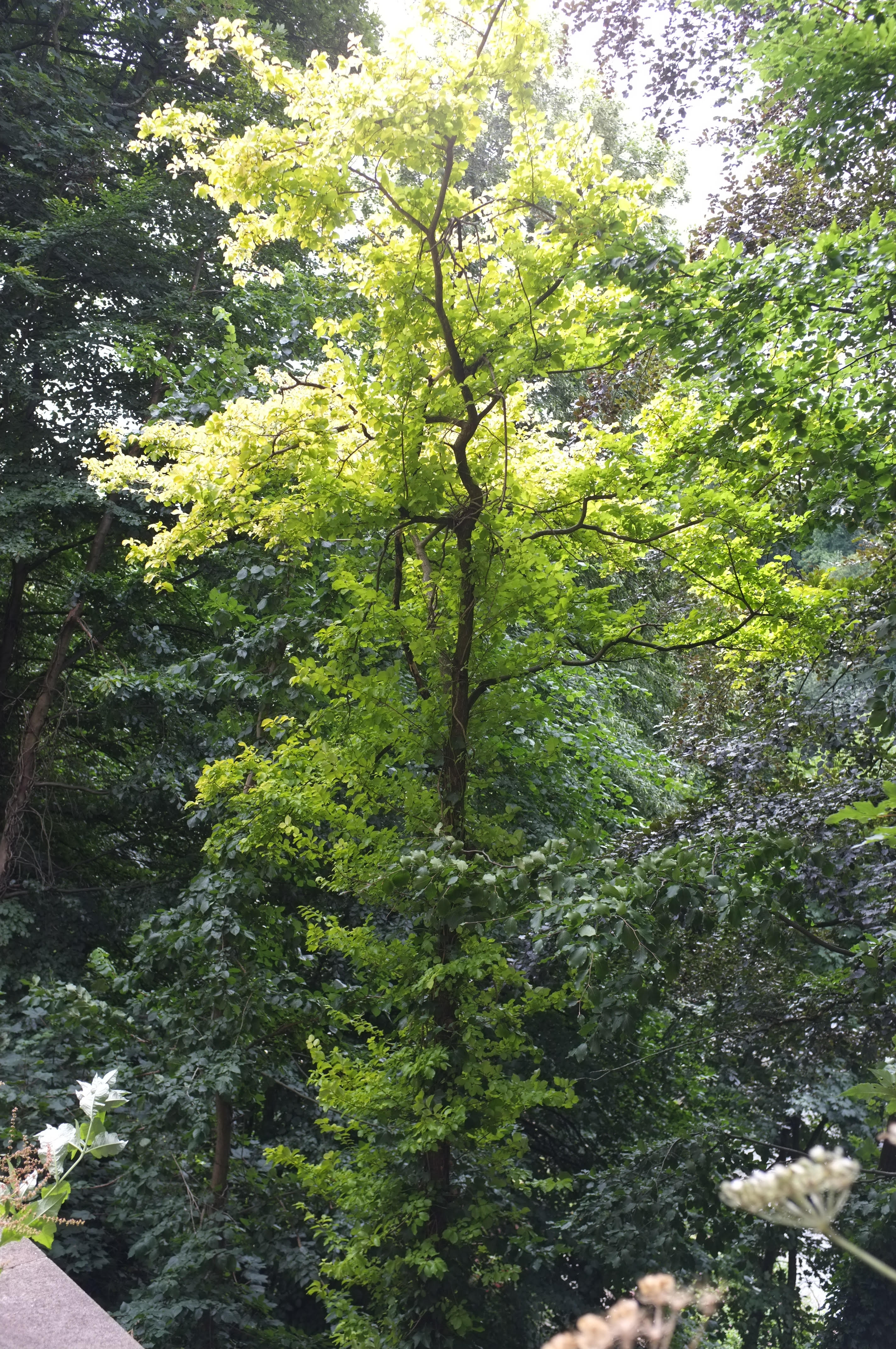
'Dicksonii' near Durham Cathedral (2017)

== Accessions ==
- Borde Hill Garden, Haywards Heath, West Sussex. One specimen, partially reverting (2025).
