= Ulmus × hollandica 'Wredei' =

Hybrid elm cultivar

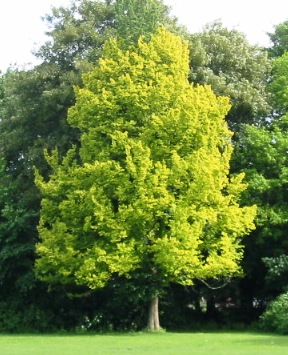
- 'Wredei', Stadspark, Groningen.
- Hybrid parentage: U. glabra × U. minor
- Cultivar: 'Wredei'
- Origin: Germany

The hybrid elm cultivar Ulmus × hollandica 'Wredei', also known as Ulmus × hollandica 'Dampieri Aurea' and sometimes marketed as Golden Elm, originated as a sport of the cultivar 'Dampieri' at the Alt-Geltow Arboretum, near Potsdam, Germany, in 1875.

Not to be confused with two other popular cultivars named 'Golden Elm', Ulmus glabra 'Lutescens' and Ulmus 'Louis van Houtte'.

== Description ==
The tree is fastigiate when young, but like its parent 'Dampieri' can become more spreading with age. It has broad, crinkled leaves clustered on short shoots; when these are young they are suffused yellow, but as the tree ages they revert to green.

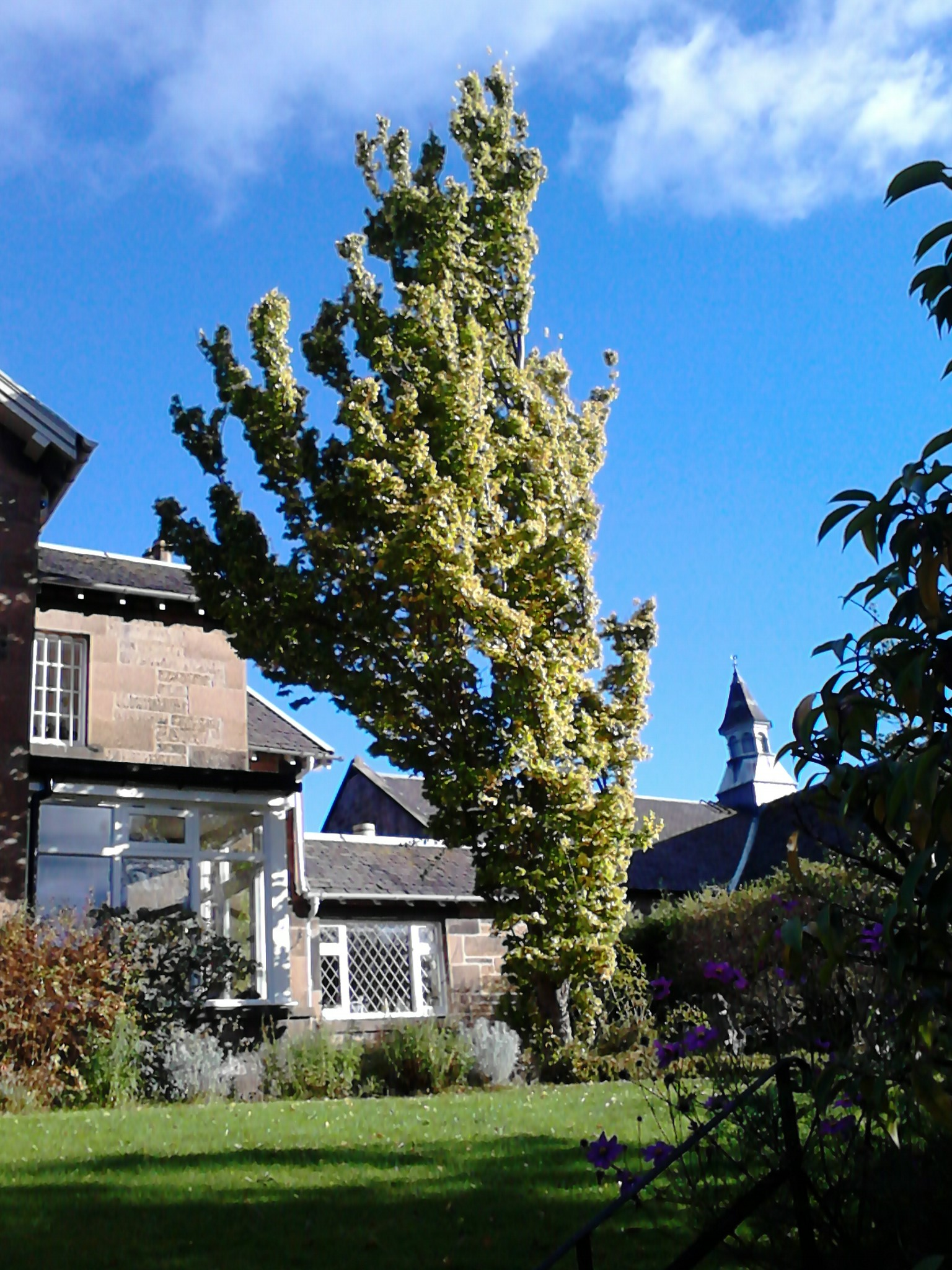
Young 'Dampieri Aurea', Morningside, Edinburgh

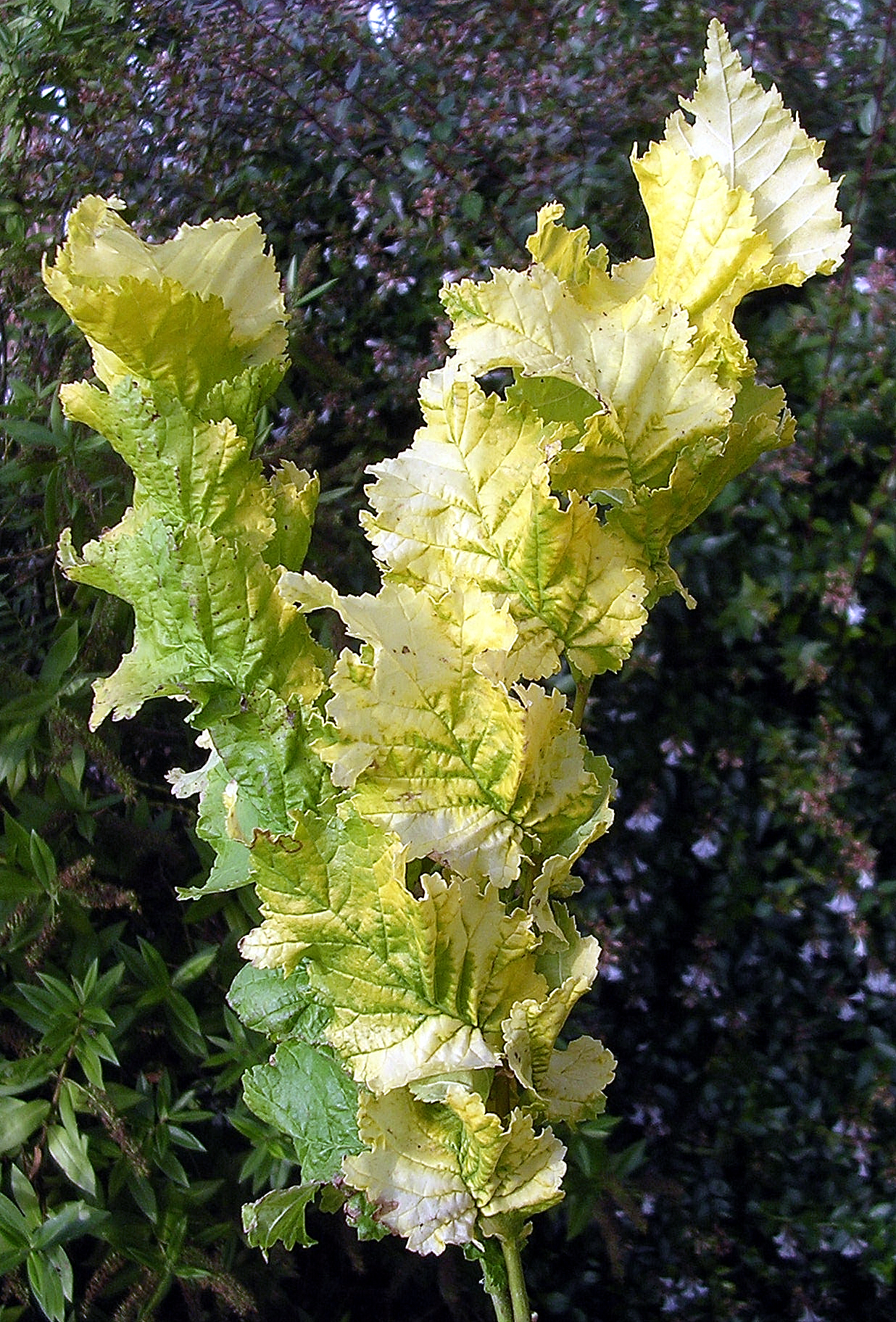
Long shoots

== Pests and diseases ==
'Wredei' is susceptible to Dutch elm disease.

== Cultivation ==
'Wredei' was distributed by the Louis van Houtte and Späth nurseries in the late 19th century (Louis van Houtte described it in 1881 as a "superbe nouveauté"). Späth supplied one tree, as U. montana fastigiata aurea, to the Dominion Arboretum, Ottawa, in 1893, and three in 1902 to the Royal Botanic Garden Edinburgh in 1902 as U. montana fastigiata Dampieri Wredei. 'Dampieri Aurea' appears in the 1902 catalogue of the Bobbink and Atkins nursery, Rutherford, New Jersey, and in Kelsey's 1904 catalogue, New York. Ulmus Wredei aurea was introduced to Australia in the early 20th century, and later to New Zealand. 'Wredei' is currently one of the most popular elms on sale in Europe owing to its colourful foliage and modest size. Since c.2020, losses in the admired avenue of Ulmus × hollandica 'Louis van Houtte' in Osborne Place, Aberdeen, have been made good with the more resistant 'Wredei'.

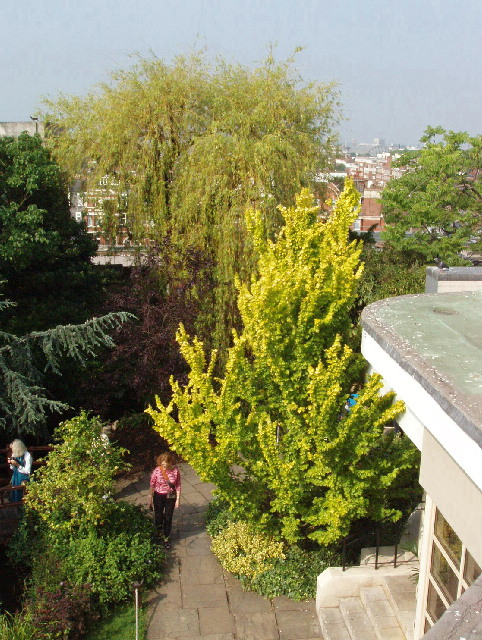
Rooftop 'Dampieri Aurea', Kensington Roof Gardens (2007)

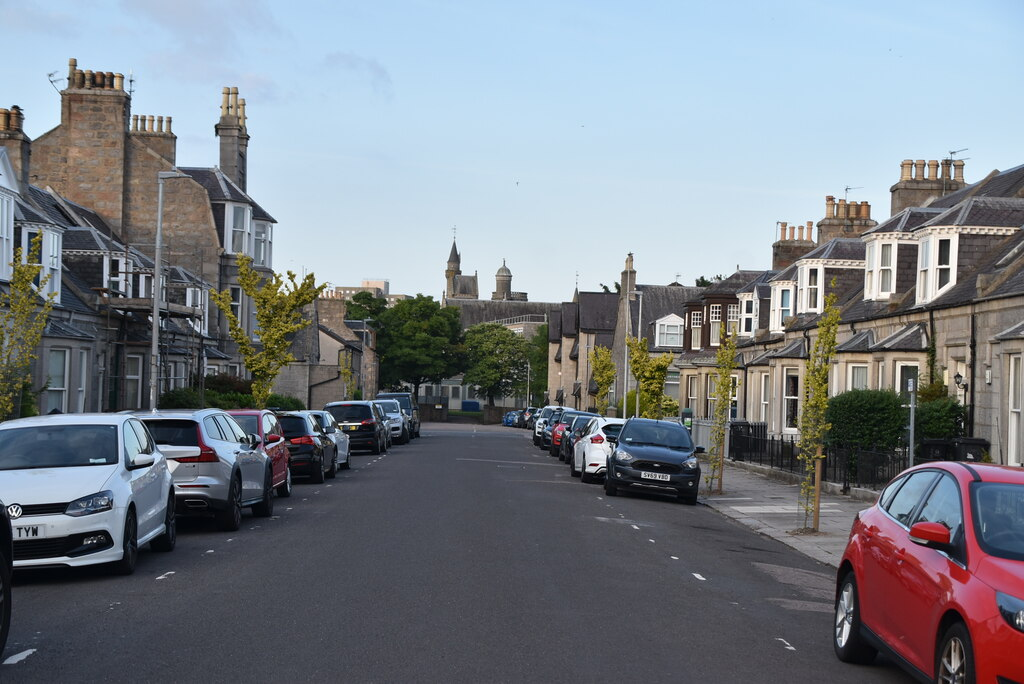
New plantings of 'Wredei' in Osborne Place, Aberdeen (2022)

For the 'Golden Elm' at Great Dixter Gardens, Northiam, East Sussex, apparently miscalled 'Dampieri Aurea' by the horticulturalist Christopher Lloyd, see U. minor 'Dicksonii'.

== Notable trees ==
In the UK, the Tree Register of the British Isles (TROBI) Champion is at Blakers Park, Brighton, measuring 17 m high and 57 cm d.b.h. in 2009, when the leaf colour was reverting to green.

== Etymology ==
The tree is named for Joseph Wrede (1831–1912), Royal Horticultural Inspector at the Royal State Nursery, Alt-Geltow, Potsdam, and curator of the Alt-Geltow Arboretum.

== Synonymy ==
- Ulmus campestris 'Wredei' Hort. ex Lauche, Deutsch. Dendr. 347 (1880).
- Ulmus carpinifolia var. Dampieri f. Wredei Juhlke
- Ulmus dampieri 'Wredei': Krüssmann, in Parey's Blumengartn, ed. 2.1: 519, 1958.
- Ulmus dampieri var. Wredei: Juhlke , in Hamburg Gart.- & Blumenzeit, 33: 485, 1877.
- Ulmus Dippeliana f. Wredei (Hort.) Schneider, Illustriertes Handbuch der Laubholzkunde, 1:218, fig. 136p, 1904.
- Ulmus × hollandica 'Dampieri Aurea'
- Ulmus montana var. Dampieri aurea Wrede ex Jaeger & Beissner , Ziergeh. ed. 2, 403 (1884).
- Ulmus montana var. Dampieri Wredei Ruempler, Gartenbau-Lex. 930(1890). - Rehder in Miller's Deutsch Gartn.-Zeit. 13: 160, fig. (1898).
- Ulmus montana var. fastigiata aurea Hort. ex Nicholson Kew Hand-list Trees Shrubs, 2: 141 (1896).
- Ulmus montana pyramidalis Wredei – Catalogue de Louis van Houtte, 1881-2
- Ulmus scabra var. Dampieri var. Wredei (Juhlke) Hartwig Illustrirtes Gehölzbuch 393 (1892).
- Ulmus nitens f. Wredei Rehder in Mitteilungen der Deutschen dendrologischen gesellschaft 24(1915): 218 (1916).
- Ulmus foliacca var. Wredei Rehder in Bailey, Stand. Cvcl. Hort. 6: 3413 (1917).
- Ulmus Wreedi aurea: Leach, ex Journal of the Royal Horticultural Society of London, 16: lxi, 1893.

== Accessions ==
North America

- Dominion Arboretum, Canada. No details available.
- Morton Arboretum, Illinois, US. Acc. no. 269–57 (as Smooth-leaved Elm, U. carpinifolia 'Wredei')

Europe

- Brighton & Hove City Council, UK. NCCPG Elm Collection, listed as U. minor 'Wredei'. Old tree in Blakers Park; newly planted trees at Wild Park and Withdean.
- Grange Farm Arboretum, Lincolnshire, UK. Acc. no. 525 (as Ulmus wredei 'Aurea')
- Hortus Botanicus Nationalis, Salaspils, Latvia. Acc. no. 18119 (as U × hollandica 'Dampieri Aurea')
- Royal Horticultural Society Gardens, Wisley, UK. No details available.
- South Park Gardens, Wimbledon, London, UK. TROBI champion: 14 m high, 59 cm d.b.h. in 2001.
- University of Copenhagen Botanic Gardens, Denmark. No details available.
- Wijdemeren City Council, Netherlands. Elm collection. 2 planted (around 1980) playground Rembrandt van Rijnlaan, Loosdrecht.

Australasia

- Royal Botanic Gardens Victoria (Melbourne), Australia
- Ballarat Botanical Gardens, Australia. Listed on the Significant Tree Register of the National Trust.
- Eastwoodhill Arboretum , Gisborne, New Zealand. One tree (as U. minor 'Wredei'), details not known.

== Nurseries ==
Widely available.
