= Ulmus × hollandica 'Dampieri' =

Elm cultivar

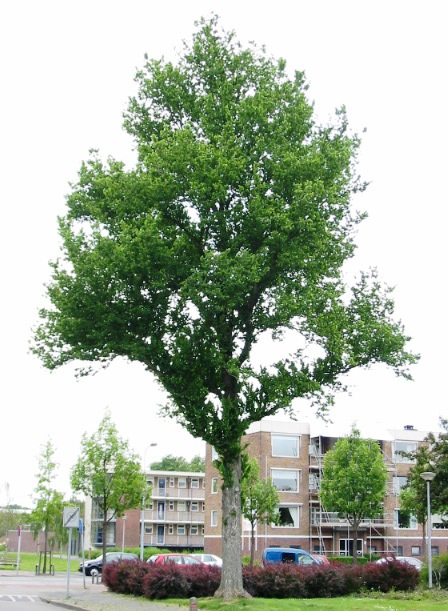
- 'Dampieri', Groningen.
- Hybrid parentage: U. glabra × U. minor
- Cultivar: 'Dampieri'
- Origin: Europe

The hybrid elm cultivar Ulmus × hollandica 'Dampieri', one of a number of cultivars arising from the crossing of the Wych Elm U. glabra with a variety of Field Elm U. minor, is believed to have originated in continental Europe. It was marketed in Wetteren, Belgium, in 1851 as 'Orme de Dampier', then in the Low Countries in 1853, and later identified as Ulmus campestris var. nuda subvar. fastigiata Dampieri Hort., Vilv. by Wesmael (1862).

== Description ==
A fastigiate, conical tree with upright branches bearing tough, ovate leaves < 8 cm long, densely clustered on short, glabrous shoots.

== Pests and diseases ==
The tree is susceptible to Dutch elm disease.

== Etymology ==
The tree may be named after the explorer and botanist William Dampier (1651–1715) from East Coker, Somerset, though given its European heritage and 19th century introduction, it is more likely that 'Dampier' was a continental nurseryman from that period.

== Cultivation ==
'Dampieri' was commonly planted in towns in continental northern Europe during the latter half of the 19th century. It was marketed as U. montana fastigiata Dampieri by the Späth nursery of Berlin and by the Ulrich nursery of Warsaw, and as Ulmus montana pyramidalis Dampieri by the van Houtte nursery of Ghent. The Hesse Nursery of Weener, Germany, supplied it as U. montana 'Dampieri' in the 1930s and as U. campestris 'Dampieri' in the 1950s.

Introduced to the US in the 1850s, 'Dampierre's pyramidal elm' was stocked by Hovey's nursery of Boston, Massachusetts, from the 1850s, and by the Mount Hope Nursery (also known as Ellwanger and Barry) of Rochester, New York, later appearing as U. montana Dampieri in the catalogues of the Bobbink and Atkins nursery, Rutherford, New Jersey, and as U. pyramidalis de Dampierre in those of Kelsey's, New York. There is a specimen at the Morton Arboretum. One tree was sent by Späth to the Dominion Arboretum, Ottawa, Canada, in 1896 as U. montana fastigiata (syn. U. montana fastigiata Dampieri), and three to the Royal Botanic Garden Edinburgh in 1902. 'Dampieri' remains in cultivation in Europe.

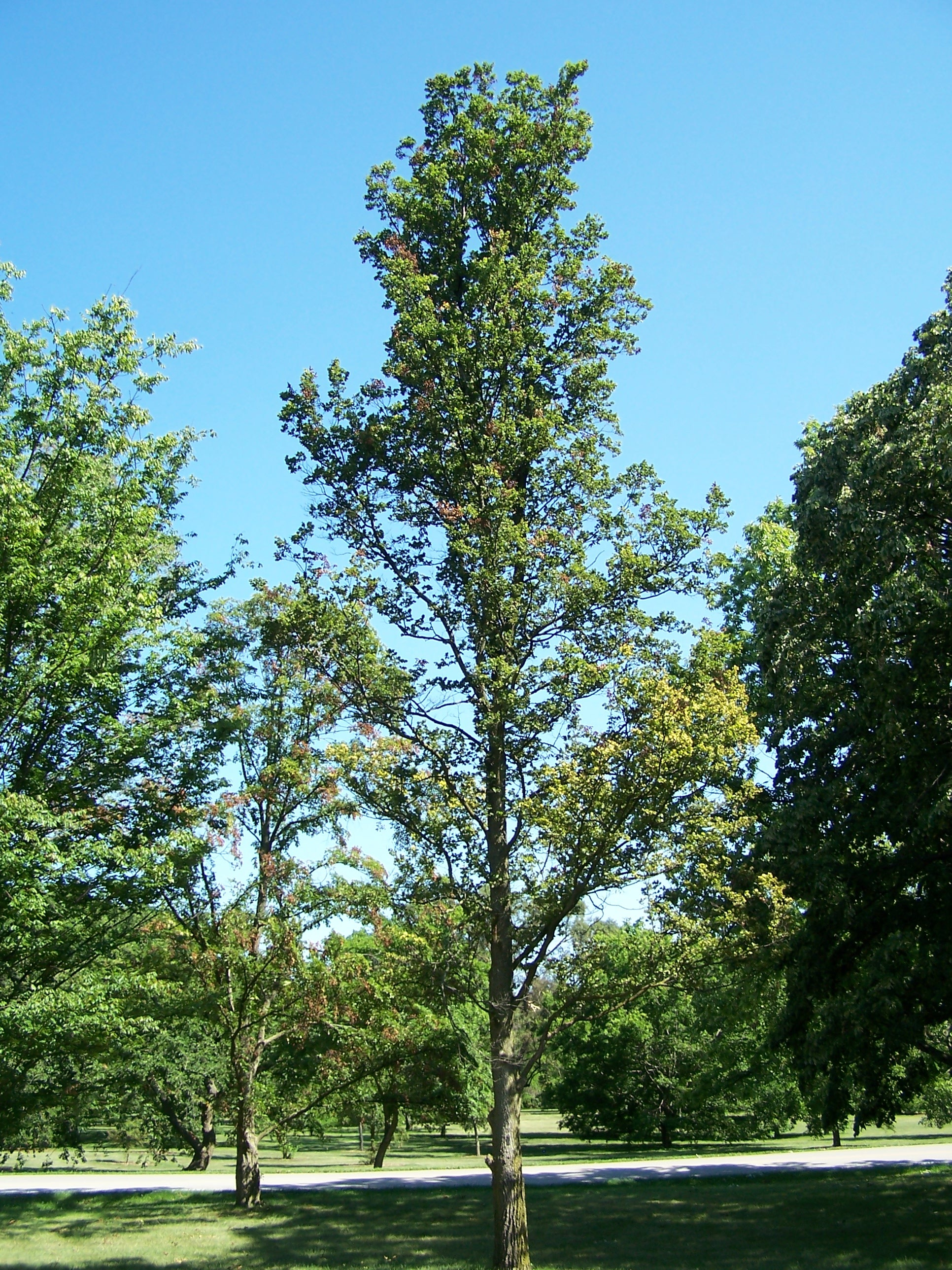
Young Dampier Elm at Morton Arboretum, 2007

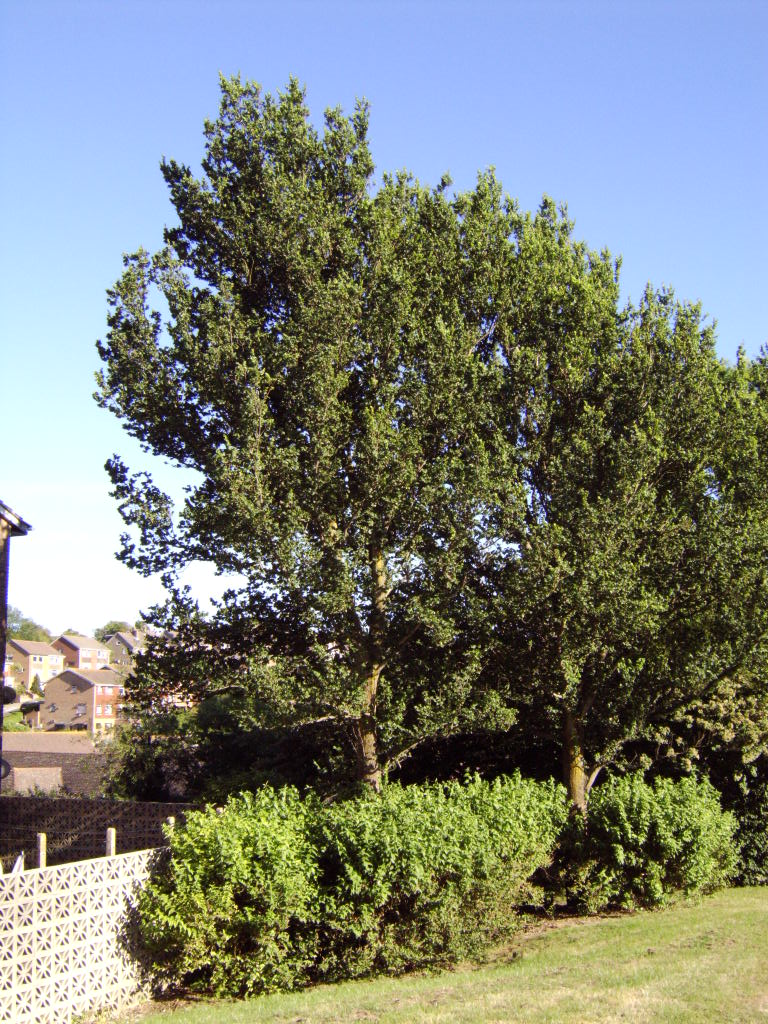
'Dampieri' in Kipling Avenue, Woodingdean, Brighton, 2007

J. F. Wood in The Midland Florist and Suburban Horticulturist (1851) described a round-headed U. Pyramidalis (an early synonym of 'Dampieri') acquired from the Continent, with "broad, dense, distinct foliage" and similar in form to Lombardy Poplar, but "far preferable" for avenue planting. The early date, however, makes an identification with 'Dampieri' doubtful.

== Notable trees ==
Now a rarity in the UK; the TROBI Champion grows at St George's Road, Lambeth, London, measuring 15 m high by 48 cm d.b.h. in 2003.

== Synonymy ==
- Ulmus campestris var. nuda subvar. fastigiata Dampieri Hort., Vilv.: Wesmael, Bulletin de la Fédération des sociétés d'horticulture de Belgique 1862: 389, 1863.
- Ulmus carpinifolia (: minor) 'Dampier': Plant Buyer's Guide, ed. 6, 1285, of 1958.
- Ulmus montana var. pyramidalis: Lavallée , Arboretum Segrezianum 237, 1877.

== Forms ==
A golden form, 'Dampieri Aurea', of much the same shape and size, is also known as Ulmus × hollandica 'Wredei'.

== Accessions ==
=== North America ===
- Arnold Arboretum, US. Acc. no. 17876

=== Europe ===
- Brighton & Hove City Council, UK. NCCPG elm collection.
- Grange Farm Arboretum , Sutton St. James, Spalding, Lincs., UK. Acc. no. 841.
- Hortus Botanicus Nationalis, Salaspils, Latvia. Acc. no. 18118
- Strona Arboretum, University of Life Sciences, Warsaw, Poland.
- University of Copenhagen Botanic Garden, Denmark. Also known by the common name of 'Krusbladet'.

== Nurseries ==
=== Europe ===
- Noordplant , Glimmen, The Netherlands.
- De Reebock , Zwalm, Belgium.
- JohanVanHerreweghe, Schellebelle, Belgium
