= Ulmus glabra 'Lutescens' =

Elm cultivar

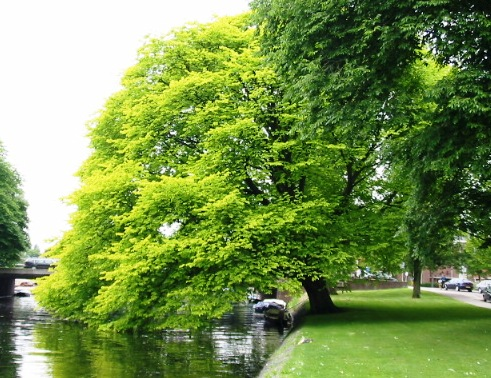
- 'Lutescens' (felled c. 2005), Vinkeleskade, Amsterdam.
- Species: Ulmus glabra
- Cultivar: 'Lutescens'
- Origin: England

The Wych Elm cultivar Ulmus glabra 'Lutescens', commonly known as the Golden Wych Elm, arose as a sort of a wych found in the York area in the early 19th century by W. Pontey of Pontey's nursery, Kirkheaton, Huddersfield, who propagated and distributed it. The original tree he named the Gallows Elm for its proximity to a gallows near York. Loudon in The Gardener's Magazine (1839) identified it as a form of Ulmus montana (:U. glabra Huds.), adding 'Lutescens' by analogy with Corstorphine sycamore, Acer pseudoplatanus 'Lutescens'.

For a time the tree was known in nurseries both in Europe and America as U. americana aurea, probably on account of its shape, and for marketing reasons.

Not to be confused with two other popular cultivars named 'Golden Elm', Ulmus × hollandica 'Wredei' and Ulmus 'Louis van Houtte'.

== Description ==
A medium-sized, fast-growing deciduous tree that reaches a height of approximately 15 m with a spread of about 20 m. In its first years, the tree is vase-shaped, but spreads as it matures to form a rounded canopy. The hue of the leaves varies according to light intensity: where exposed to full sunlight the leaves are bright yellow, but in shade no more than a lime green. 'Lutescens' is arguably the best of the golden elm cultivars since it keeps its colour as it ages.

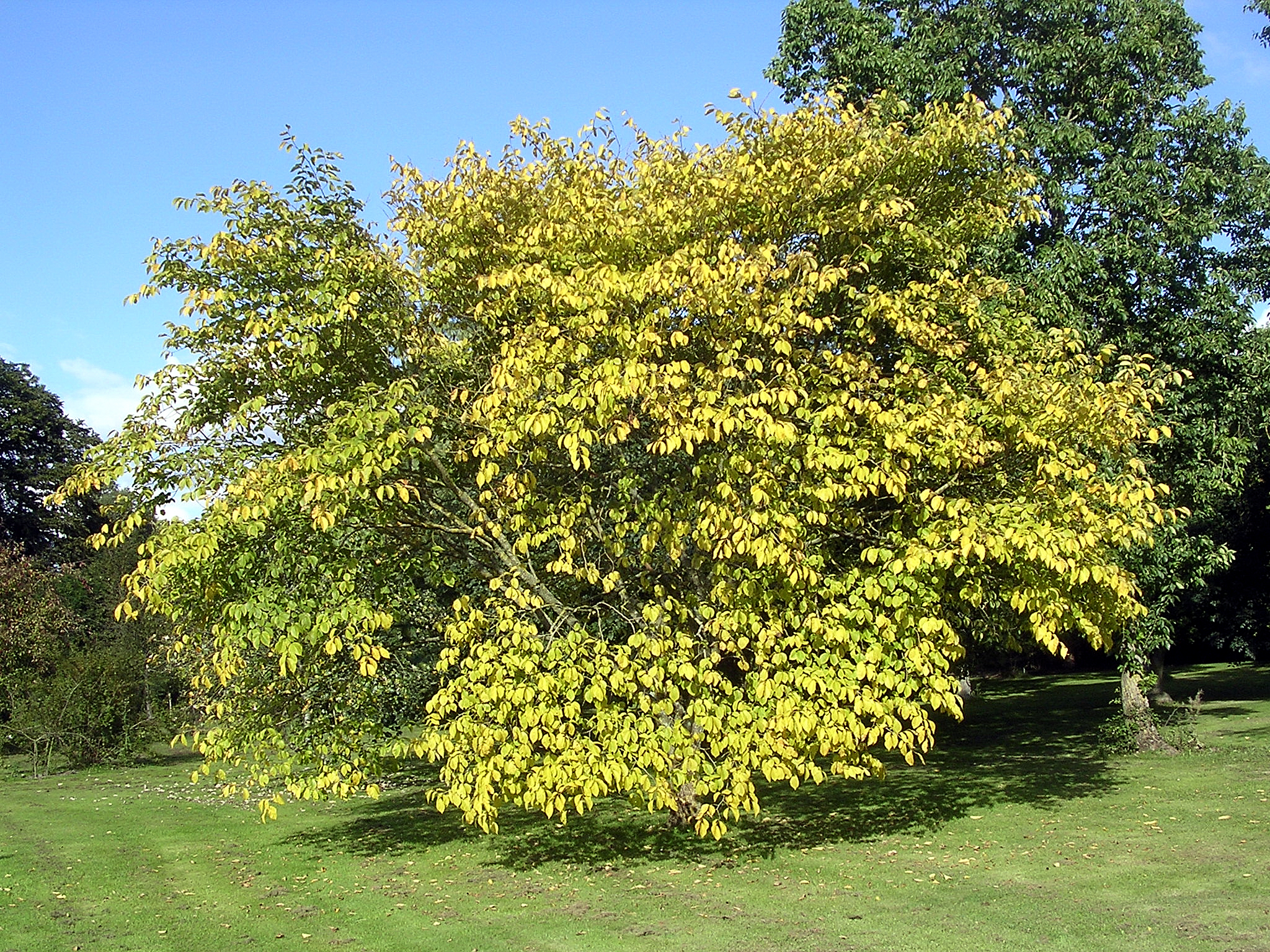
'Lutescens', Hillier Arboretum (August 2007)

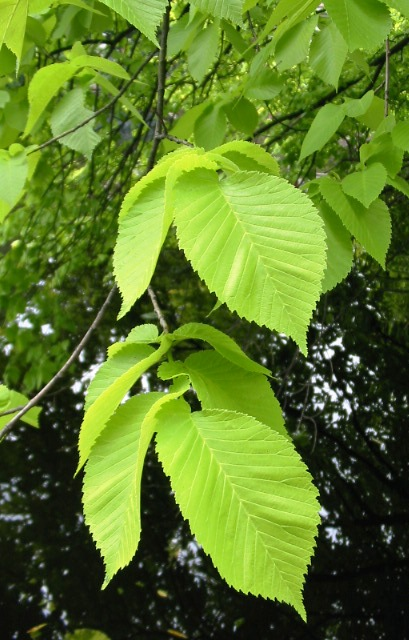
'Lutescens' leaves

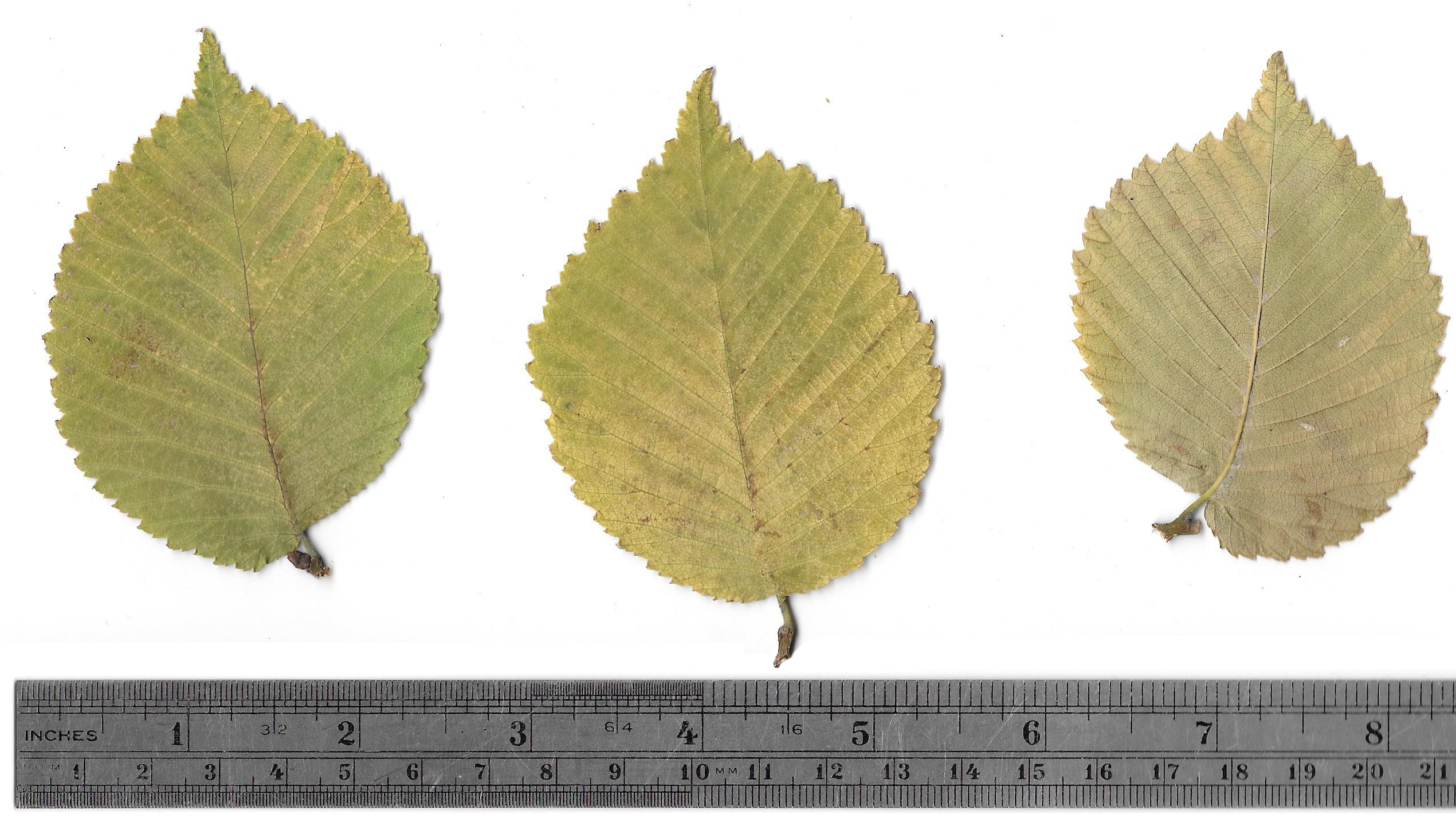
Dried long-shoot leaves of young 'Lutescens' (August)

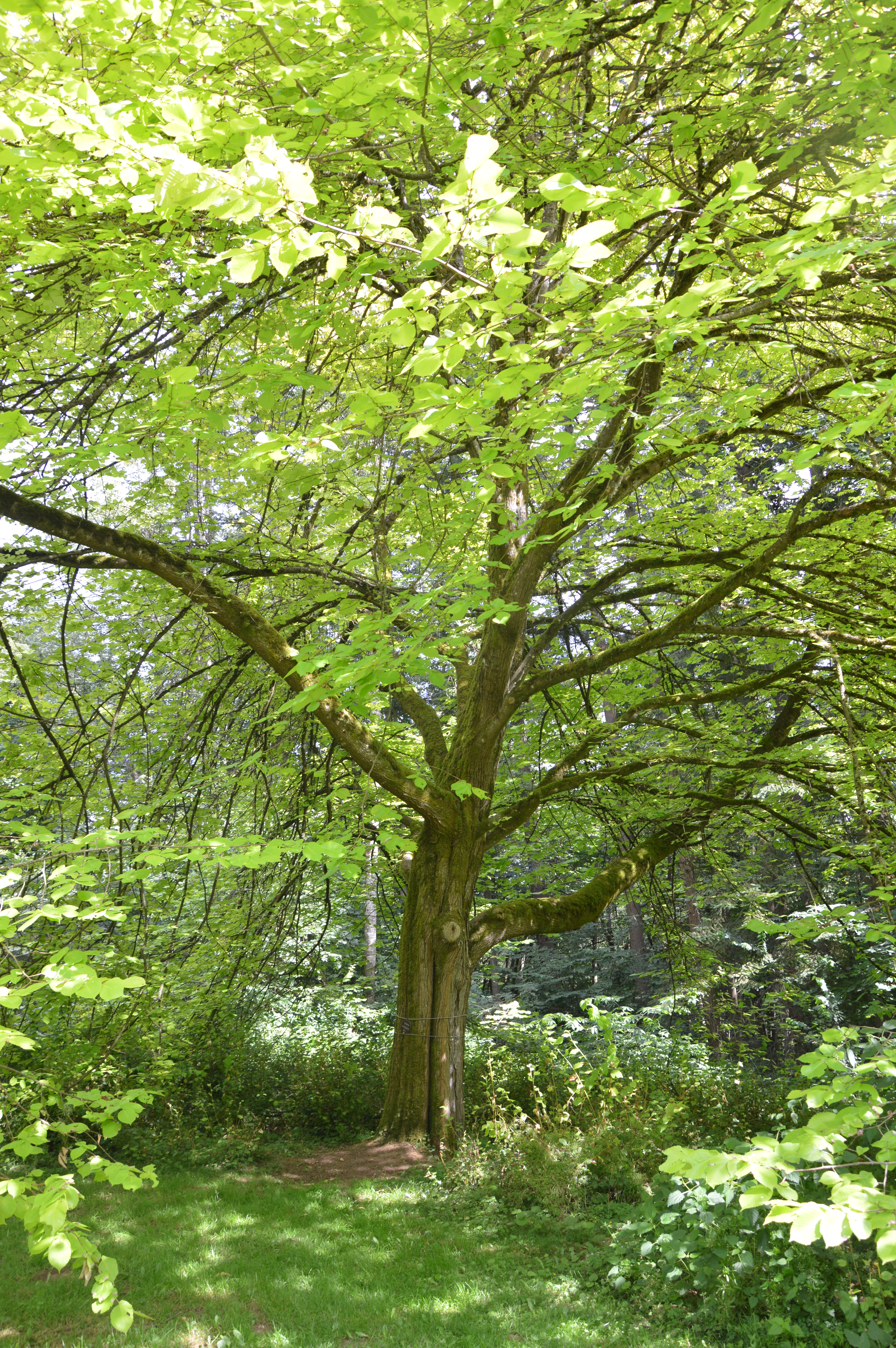
Bole

== Pests and diseases ==
The cultivar is not known to be any less susceptible to Dutch elm disease than the species. It is highly susceptible to the elm leaf beetle Xanthogaleruca luteola.

== Cultivation ==
'Lutescens' was once commonly planted in the UK, and remains in cultivation there and in Europe. (Note: 'Lutescens' was planted in Vreedenburggaarde (2009) and De Kwakel (2018), Kortenhoef, the Netherlands, as part of Wijdemeren City Council's elm collection.) It was marketed in the late 19th century as U. montana lutescens by the Späth nursery of Berlin and by the Ulrich nursery of Warsaw, whence it was introduced to Eastern Europe, where it may still survive. It was introduced to the Dominion Arboretum, Ottawa, Canada, probably from Späth, in 1897, as U. montana lutescens. Introduced to Australia and New Zealand in the early 1900s (it has been widely planted in south-east Australia), it remains in cultivation in those countries as Golden Elm, often being grafted on to Ulmus parvifolia rootstock. In Australasia 'Lutescens' has sometimes been mistakenly sold by nurseries under the name 'Louis van Houtte', a smaller-leaved golden elm.

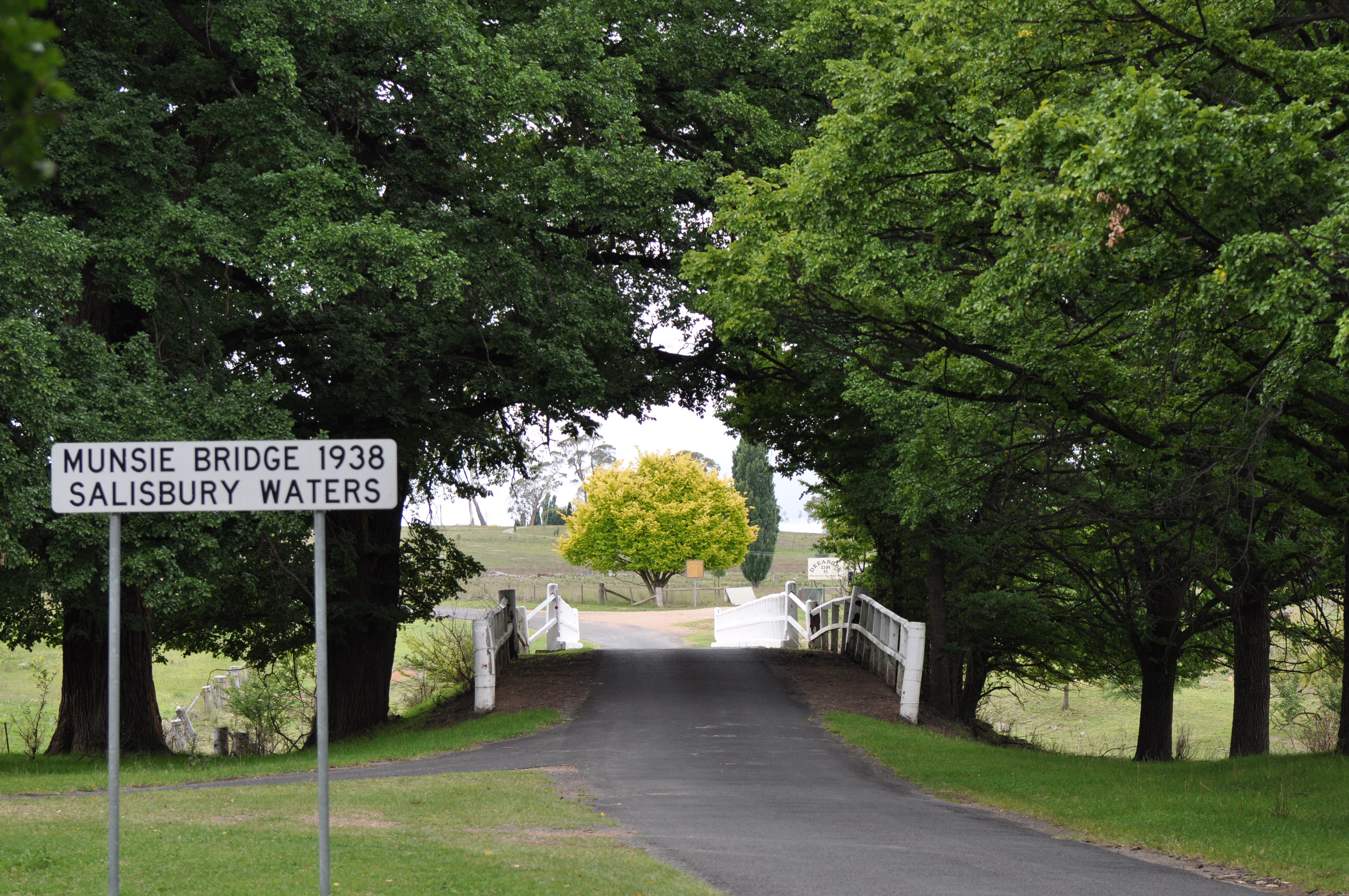
'Lutescens' framed by English Elm, Gostwyck, near Uralla, New South Wales (2013)

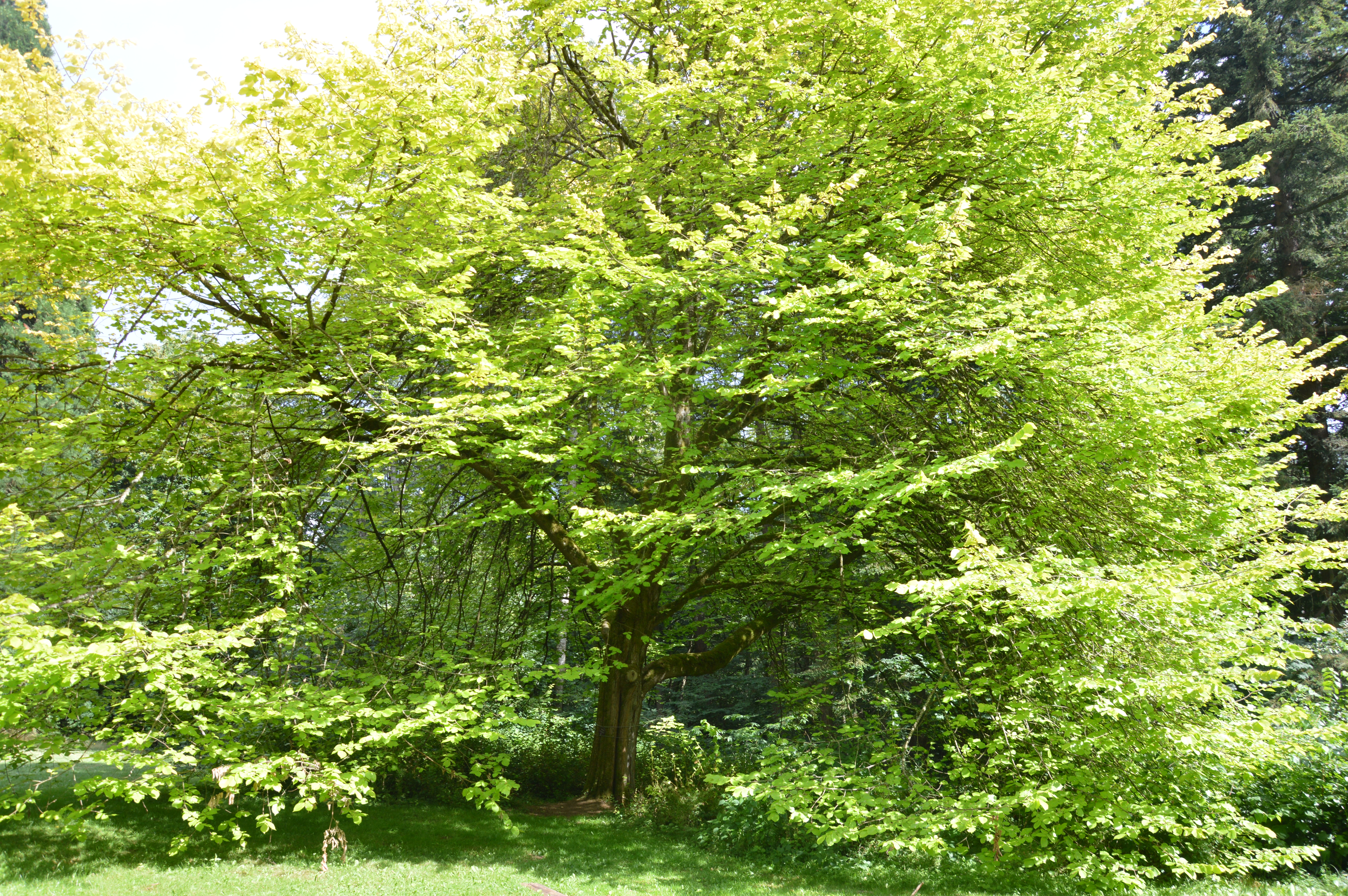
'Lutescens' in Redwood Park, Surrey, British Columbia, Canada (2014)

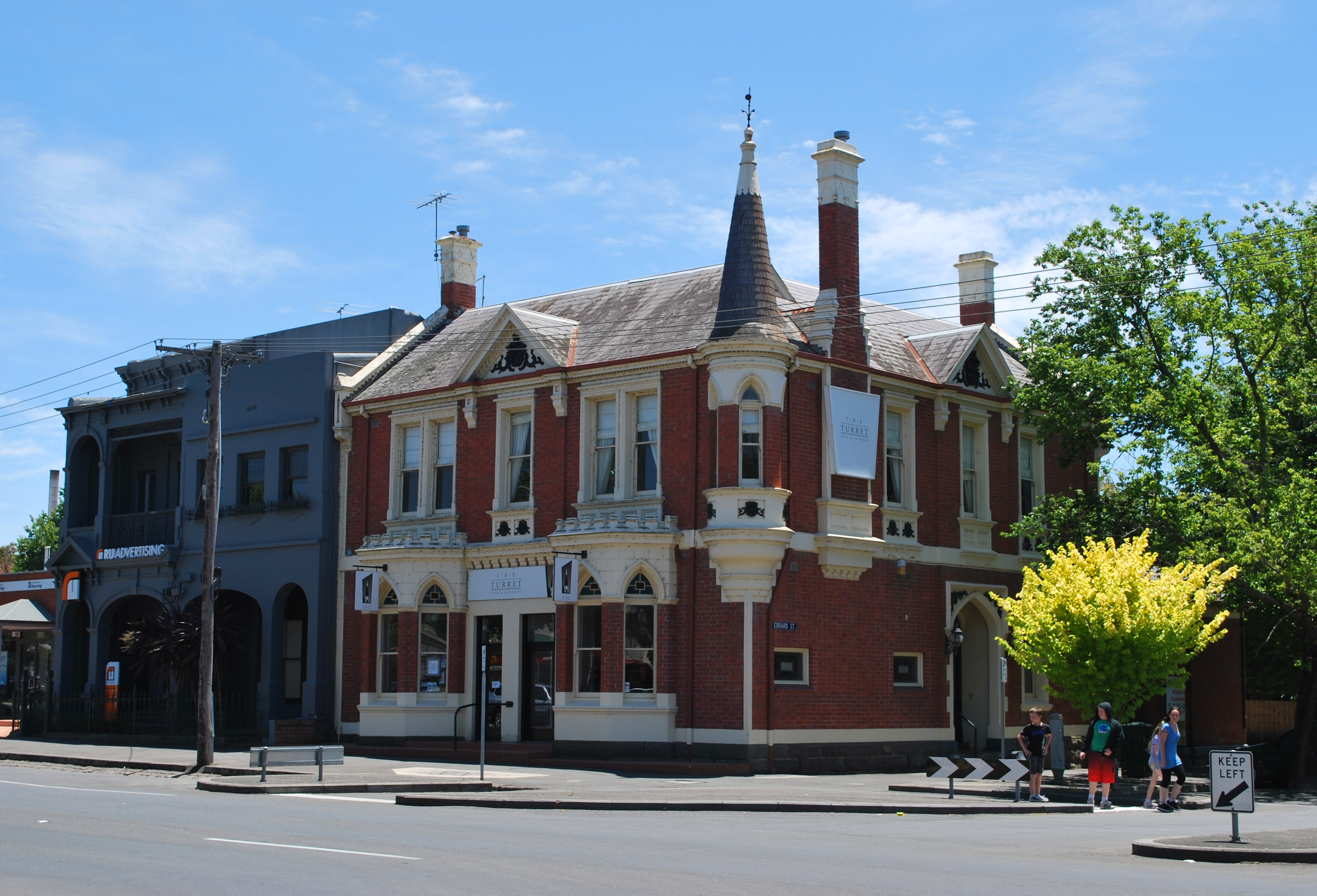
A young Golden Elm, Ballarat, Victoria, Australia

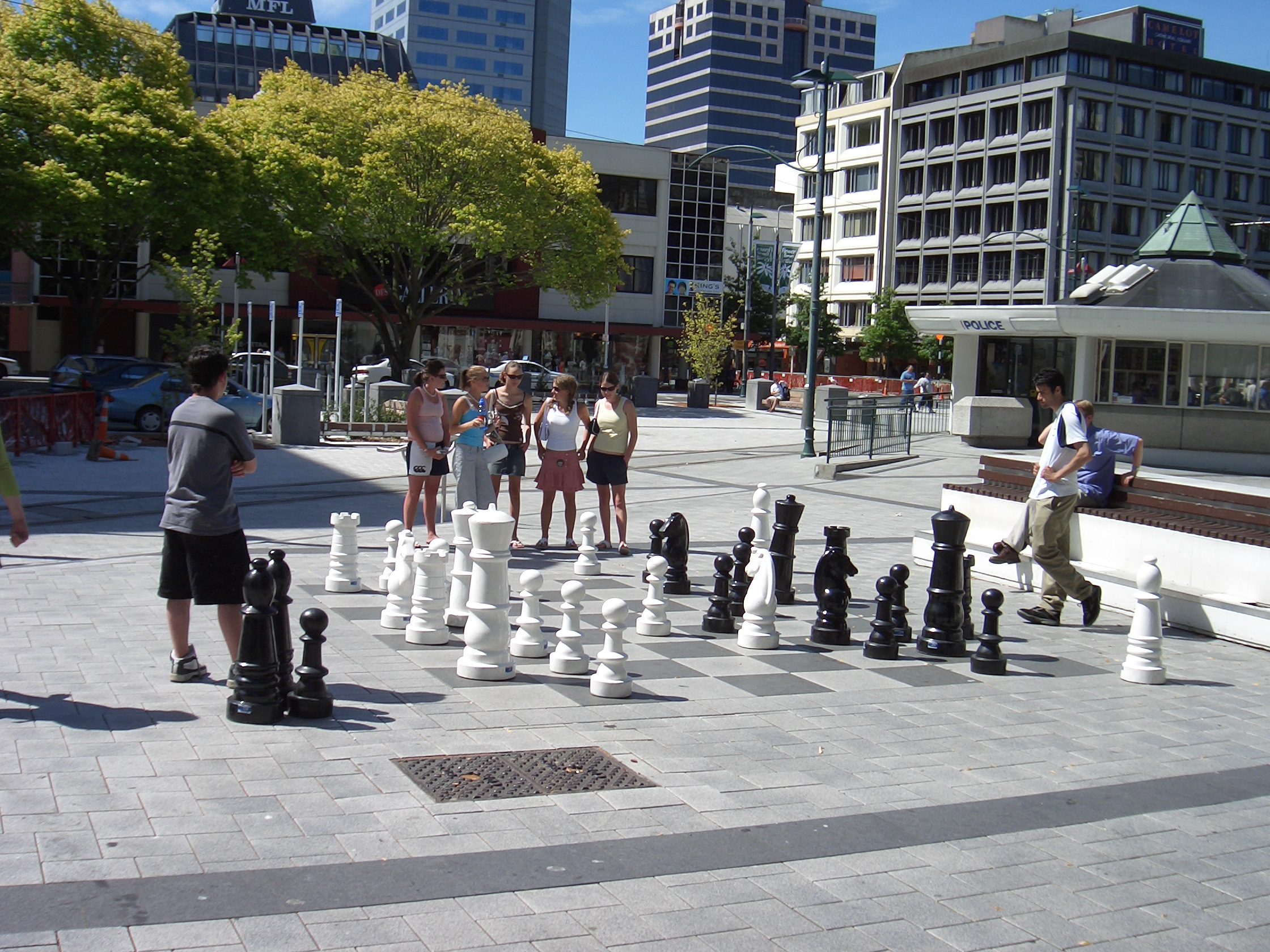
Golden Elms, Cathedral Square, Christchurch, New Zealand

== Notable trees ==
There are two notable TROBI Champion trees in England, at Pickering Park, Anlaby, measuring 16 m high by 79 cm d.b.h. in 2004, and in Dyke Road Place, Brighton, 16 m high by 76 cm d.b.h. in 2006. A fine old specimen stands close to Kruispunt Europaweg-Kerkenweg, Nieuw Schoonebeek, Drenthe, Netherlands. In Australia notable specimens grow in Williamstown Botanic Gardens, Williamstown, Victoria, in Howard Vineyard, Nairne, South Australia, and at 'Poacher's Pantry', Hall, Canberra, and there is a mature tree in the Royal Tasmanian Botanical Gardens, Hobart.

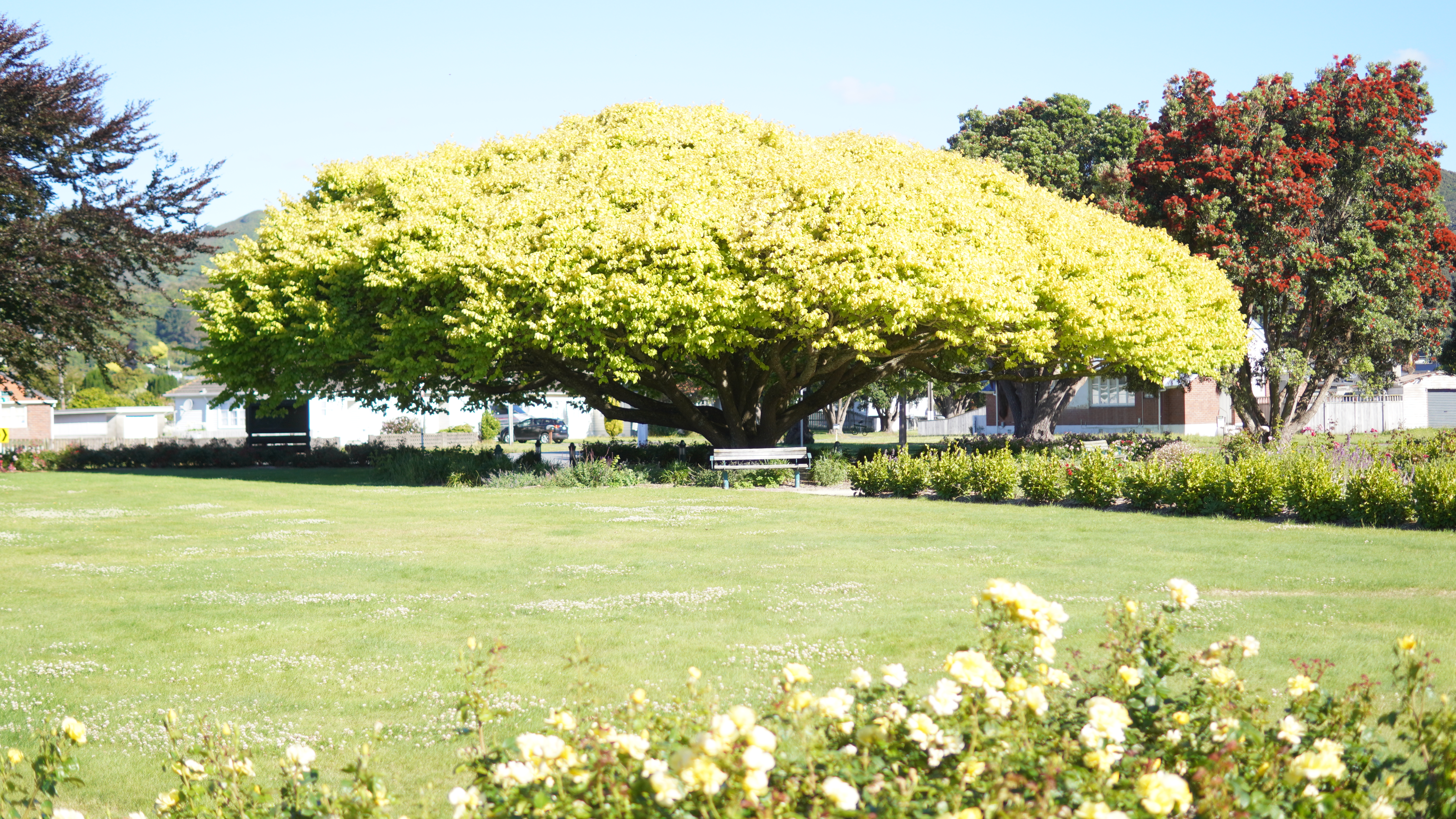
'Lutescens' in Mitchell Park, Lower Hutt, New Zealand (2024)

== Synonymy ==
- Ulmus americana aurea: Calmphtout Nursery, Belgium, in error.
- Ulmus campestris lutescens: Dieck, (Zöschen, Germany), Haupt-catalog der Obst- und gehölzbaumschulen des ritterguts Zöschen bei Merseburg 1885, p. 81.
- Ulmus campestris 'Lutescens': Boom, Nederlandse Dendrologie 1: 157, 1959.
- Ulmus scabra f. lutescens Dipp..
- Ulmus macrophylla aurea: Kelsey's of N.Y., 1904 cat.
- Ulmus glabra latifolia aurea Schelle

== Accessions ==
=== Europe ===
- Dubrava Arboretum, Lithuania. No details available.
- Grange Farm, Sutton St. James, Spalding, Lincolnshire, UK. Acc. No. 513
- Hortus Botanicus Nationalis, Salaspils, Latvia. Acc. nos. 18108,09,10,11.
- Royal Horticultural Society Gardens, Wisley, UK. Two specimens.
- Sir Harold Hillier Gardens, UK. No details available.
- Tallinn Botanic Garden, Estonia Tba.ee - Tallinna Botaanikaaed ja muud üllatuslikud vaatamisväärsused. No accession details available.
- Westonbirt Arboretum Forestry Commission - The Forestry Commission - The National Arboreta, Tetbury, Glos., UK. No planting date or acc. no. available.
- Brighton & Hove City Council, UK. NCCPG Elm Collection. Dyke Road Place, Brighton.

=== Australasia ===
- Avenue of Honour, Ballarat, Australia
- Royal Tasmanian Botanical Gardens, Hobart, Australia

== Nurseries ==
=== Europe ===
Widely available.

=== Australasia ===
- Established Tree Planters Pty. Ltd., Established Tree Transplanters | Wholesale Nursery, Wandin, Victoria, Australia.
- Fleming's Nursery Fleming's Group, Monbulk, Victoria, Australia.
