= Ulmus 'Louis van Houtte' =

Elm cultivar

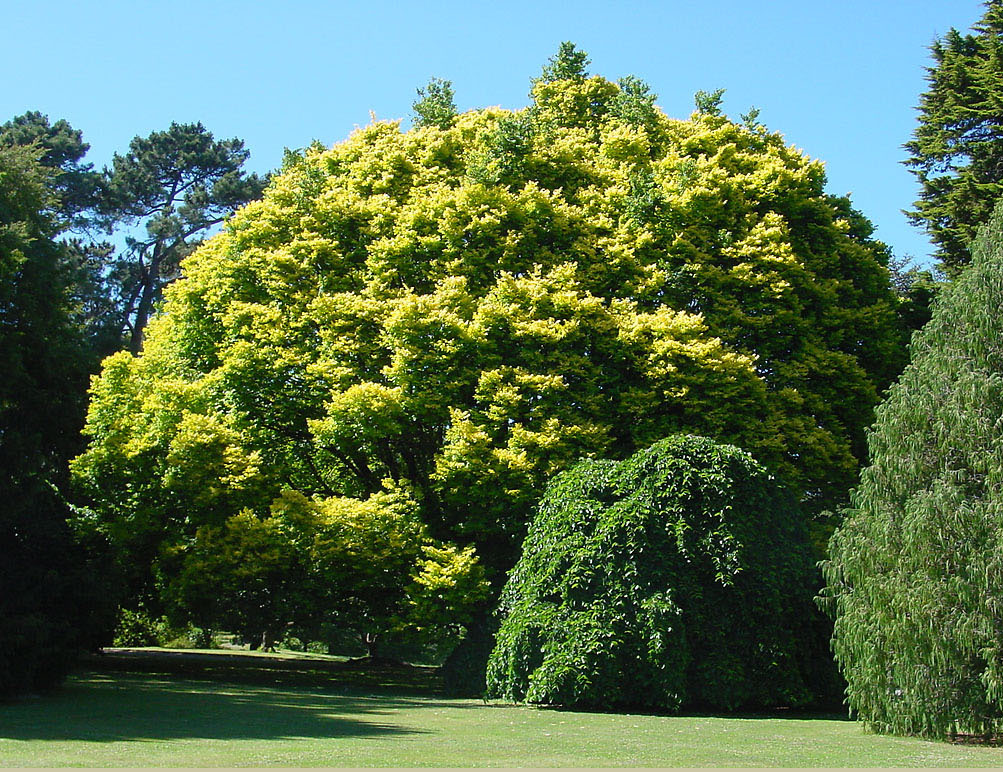
- 'Louis van Houtte' in Christchurch Botanic Gardens, New Zealand
- Genus: Ulmus
- Cultivar: 'Louis van Houtte'
- Origin: Belgium

Ulmus 'Louis van Houtte' (Syn. Ulmus 'Vanhouttei') is believed to have been first cultivated in Ghent, Belgium circa 1863. It was first mentioned by Franz Deegen in 1886. It was once thought a cultivar of English Elm Ulmus minor 'Atinia', though this derivation has long been questioned; W. J. Bean called it "an elm of uncertain status". Its dissimilarity from the type and its Belgian provenance make the 'Atinia' attribution unlikely. Fontaine (1968) considered it probably a form of U. × hollandica.

The cultivar is named for the Belgian horticulturist and plant collector Louis Benoit van Houtte, 1810–1876.

== Description ==
When young, the tree has leaves entirely yellow, a colour retained throughout summer. However, as the tree ages, the colouring may begin a gradual reversion to green. A mature specimen which retained its yellow colouration in the crown stood in Edinburgh's Royal Circus Gardens till the early 1990s. The vertically fissured bark of mature trees is unlike that of English elm, with its squarish scaly fissuring. 'Louis van Houtte' has smaller leaves than the not dissimilar Ulmus glabra 'Lutescens' (Golden Wych Elm).

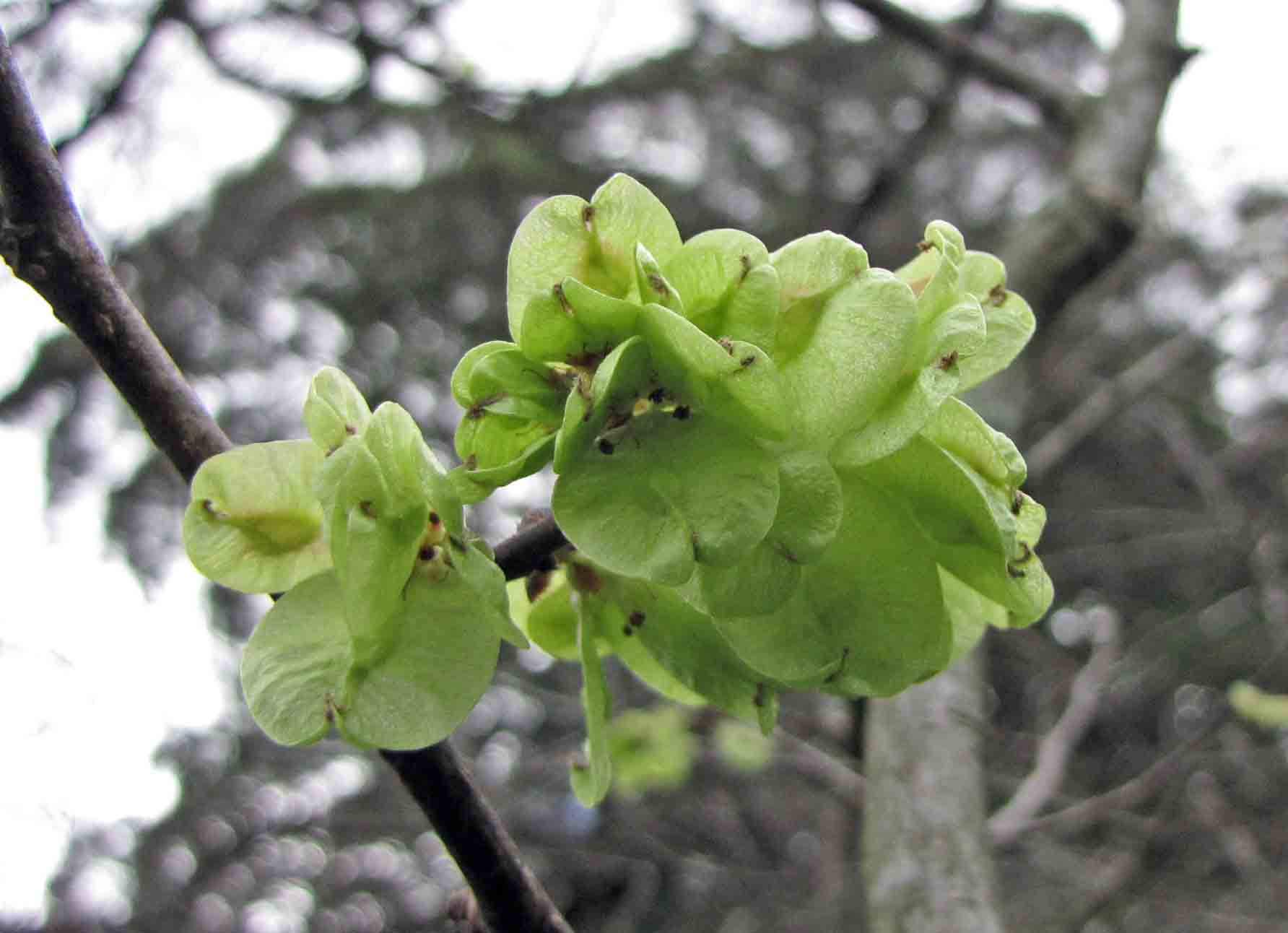
'Louis van Houtte' samarae, Royal Botanic Gardens, Melbourne, Victoria

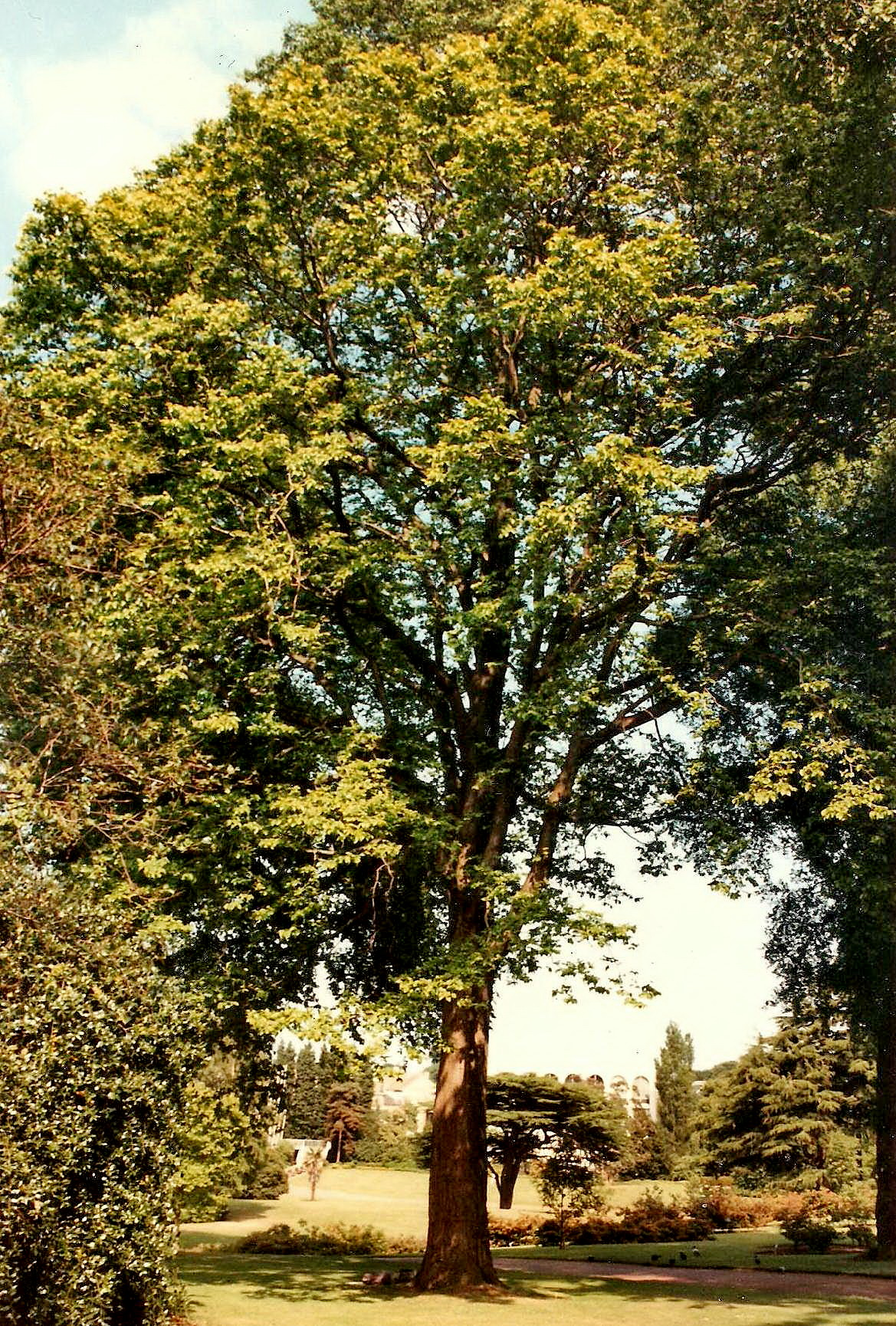
'Louis van Houtte' in Royal Botanic Garden Edinburgh (1989)

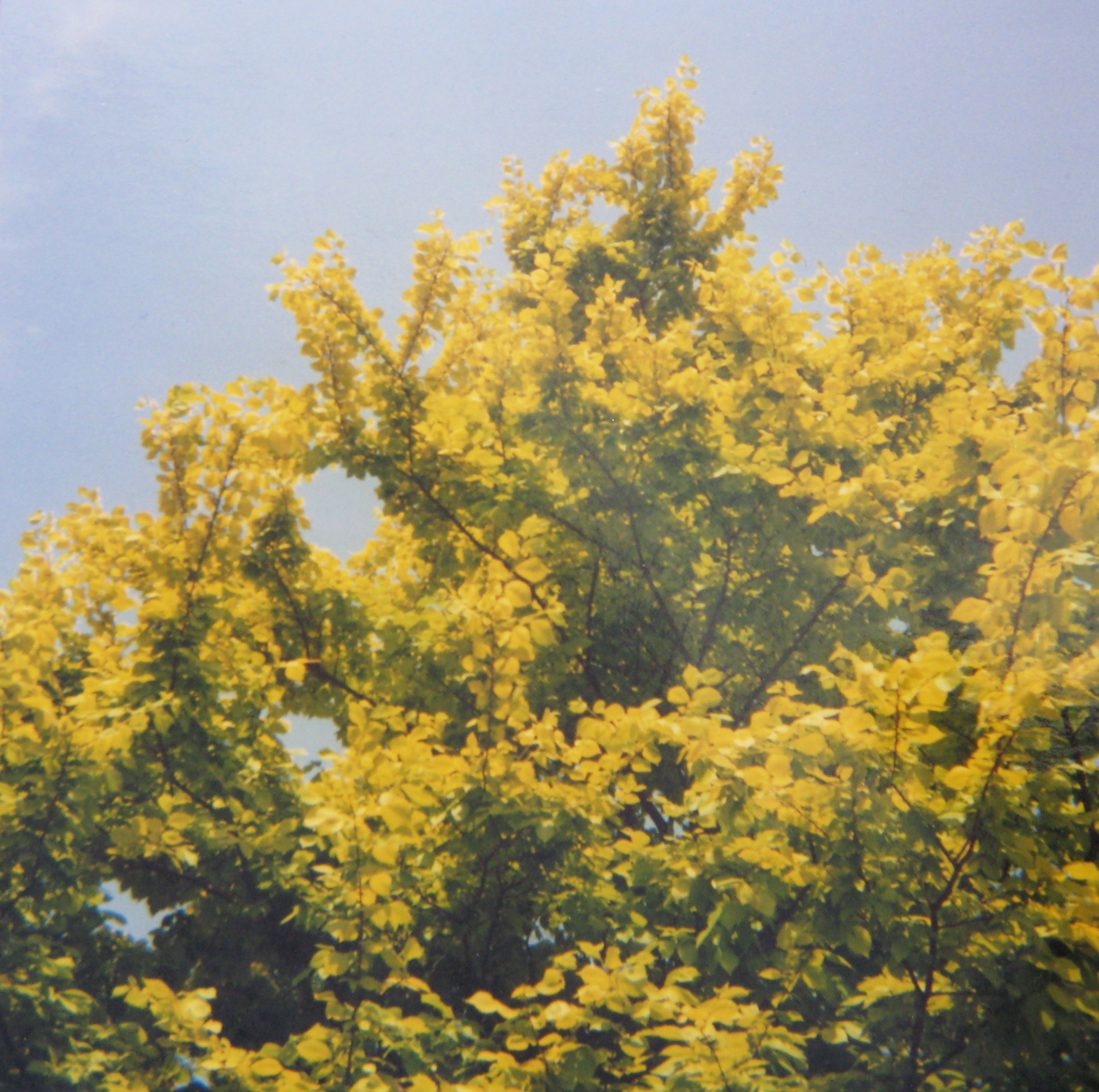
'Louis van Houtte', Brighton (July 1992)

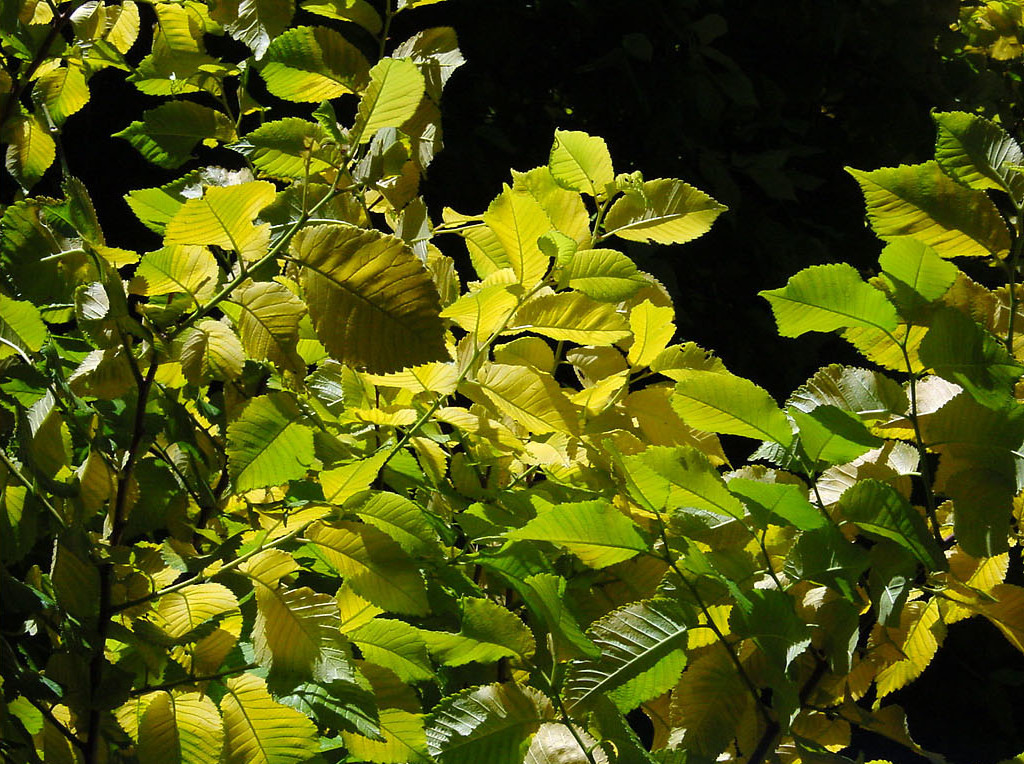
Foliage, botanic garden in Christchurch, New Zealand

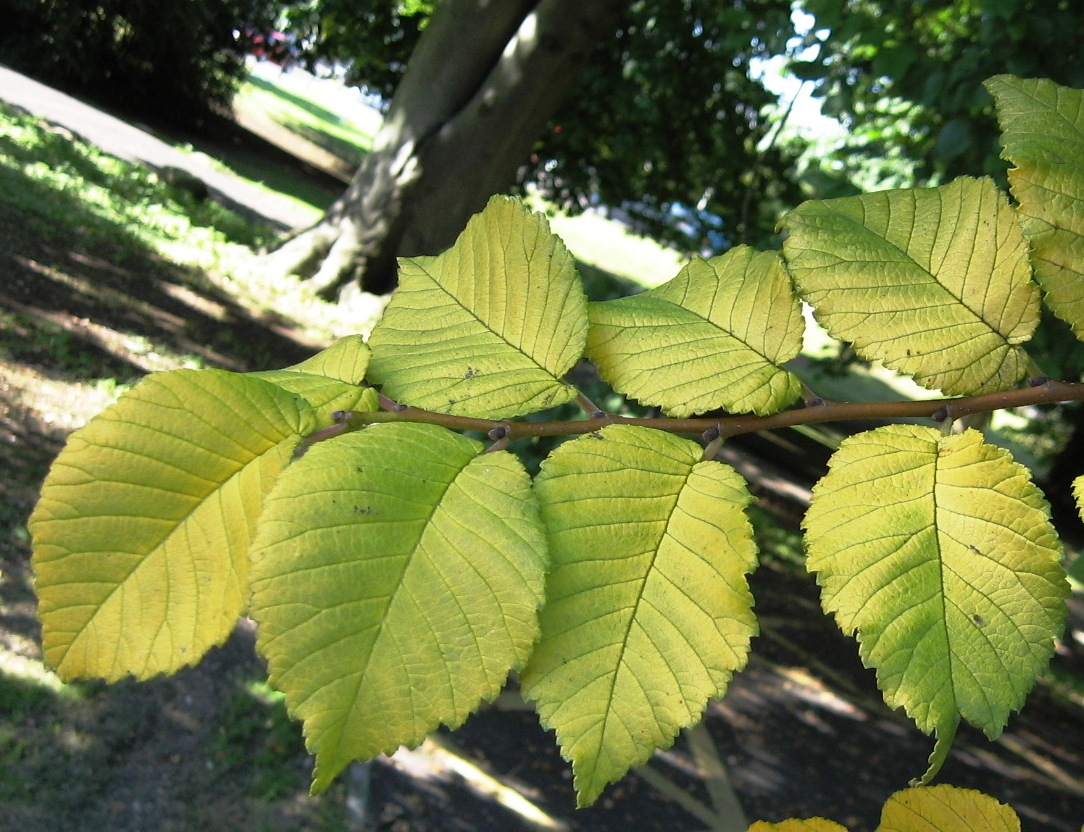
'Louis van Houtte', Preston Manor, Brighton

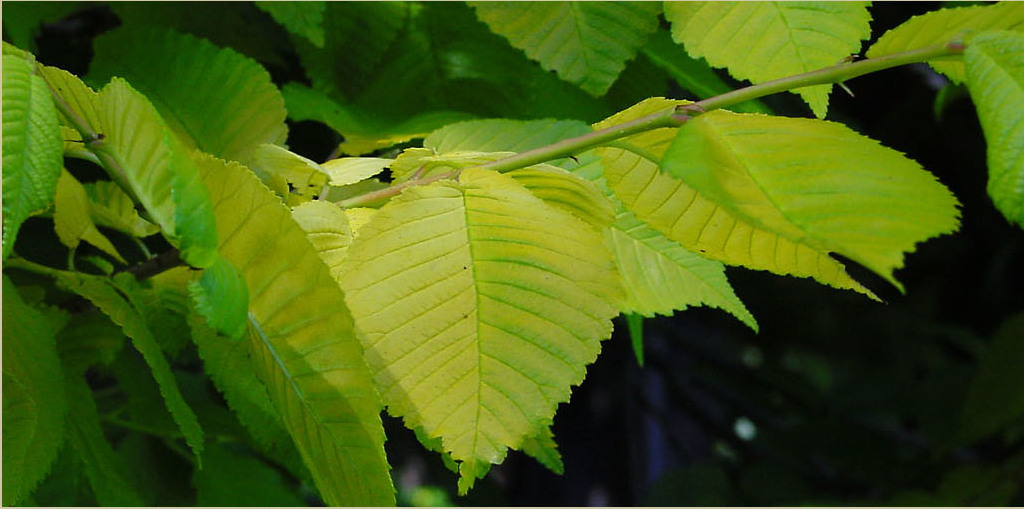
Leaves, Christchurch, New Zealand

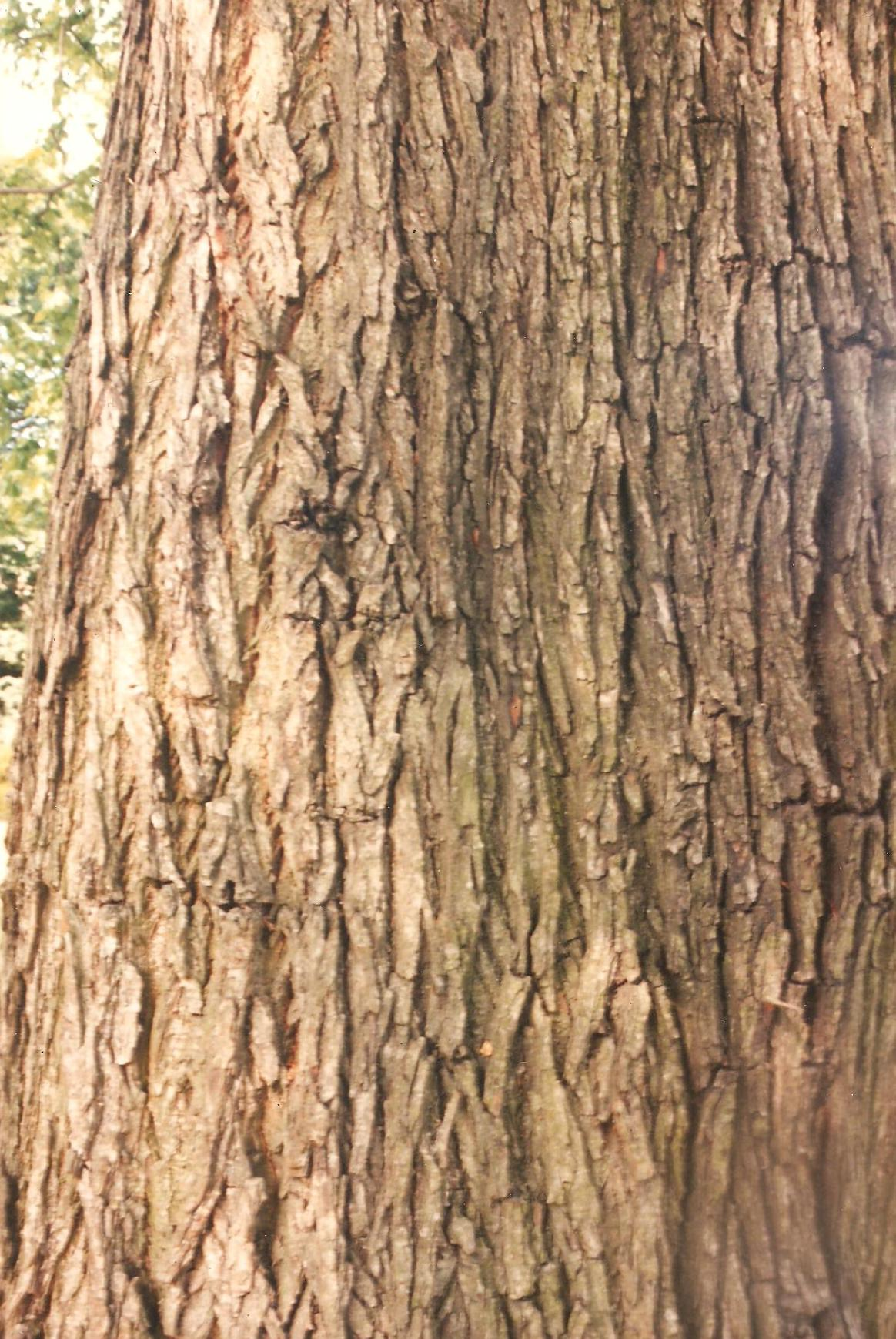
Bark of 'Louis van Houtte', Royal Botanic Garden Edinburgh

== Pests and diseases ==
'Louis van Houtte' is vulnerable to Dutch elm disease (DED). Two specimens planted at Kew Gardens in the Pagoda Vista succumbed very rapidly to the earlier strain of DED in 1931.

== Cultivation ==
Before Dutch elm disease the tree was commonly cultivated in northern Europe. The Späth nursery of Berlin marketed it in the late 19th century as U. campestris Louis van Houtte, under which name it was introduced to the Dominion Arboretum, Ottawa, Canada, in 1898, and to the Ryston Hall arboretum, Norfolk, UK, (planted 1913). In the UK the tree was supplied by Hillier & Sons Nursery of Winchester, Hampshire, as U. procera 'Vanhouttei' / 'Louis van Houtte'. The tree appeared in the 1902 catalogue of the Bobbink and Atkins nursery, Rutherford, New Jersey, as Ulmus aurea Louis van Houtte, and in Kelsey's 1904 catalogue, New York, as U. 'Louis van Houtte'. It is less commonly cultivated in Australasia, where the golden wych elm Ulmus glabra 'Lutescens' has sometimes been mistakenly sold by nurseries under the name 'Louis van Houtte'. The description, "The finest of the golden elms, with a large leaf of a clear golden colour", in the 1918 catalogue of the Gembrook or Nobelius Nursery near Melbourne, suggests 'Lutescens' rather than 'Louis van Houtte'. Three trees in separate locations are known in the British Isles, (Note: In Brighton (see Accessions); in Kew's Wakehurst Place collection (hedge form); in the garden of Whitefoord House, Edinburgh (pollarded) (2017).) as well as a partial avenue in Aberdeen (see 'Notable trees'). The tree is still occasionally cultivated in the Netherlands, a specimen being planted in 2018 in Anton Smeerdijkgaarde, Kortenhoef, as part of Wijdemeren City Council's elm collection. The cultivar remains in commerce at a nursery in the US.

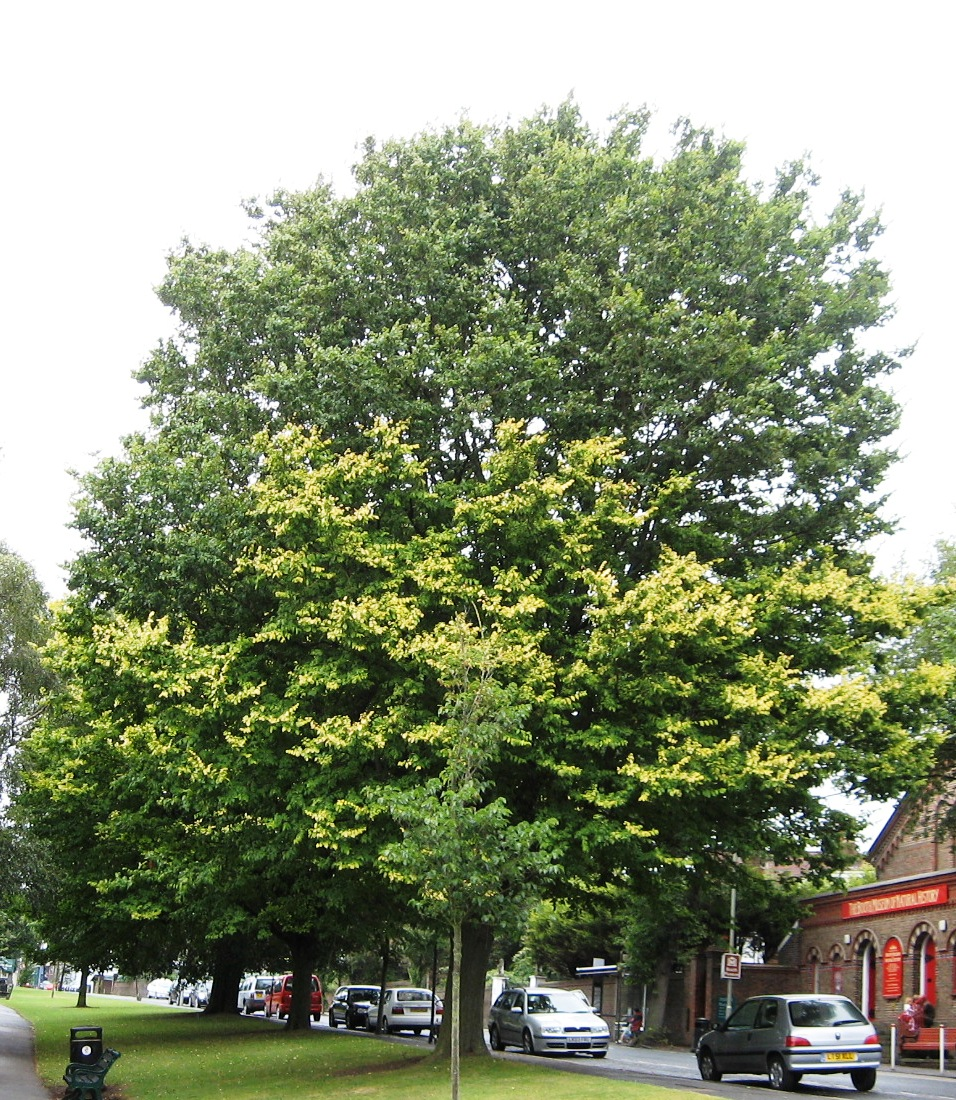
'Louis van Houtte' partially reverting, Brighton

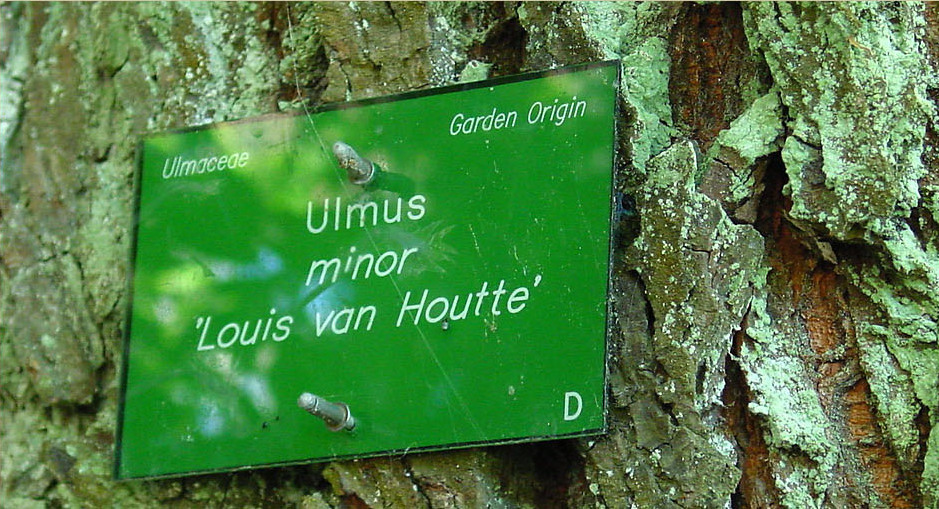
'Louis van Houtte' labelled a field elm cultivar, Christchurch, New Zealand

== Notable trees ==
Several large trees survive in Sweden, including a specimen in Kristianstad and one, planted c.1890 (girth 3.7 m), in the Serafimerparken, Stockholm (2017). Until c.2020 Osborne Place, Aberdeen was lined mostly with 'Louis Van Houtte' planted in 1936. Losses in the avenue have been replaced by the more resistant golden elm 'Wredei'.

The largest known tree is an old specimen located in Christchurch Botanic Gardens, New Zealand. The tree, planted c.1860, has a bole girth of 5.6 m, a diameter of 179.9 cm, is 27.7 m high and has an average canopy spread of 31.1 m (2023).

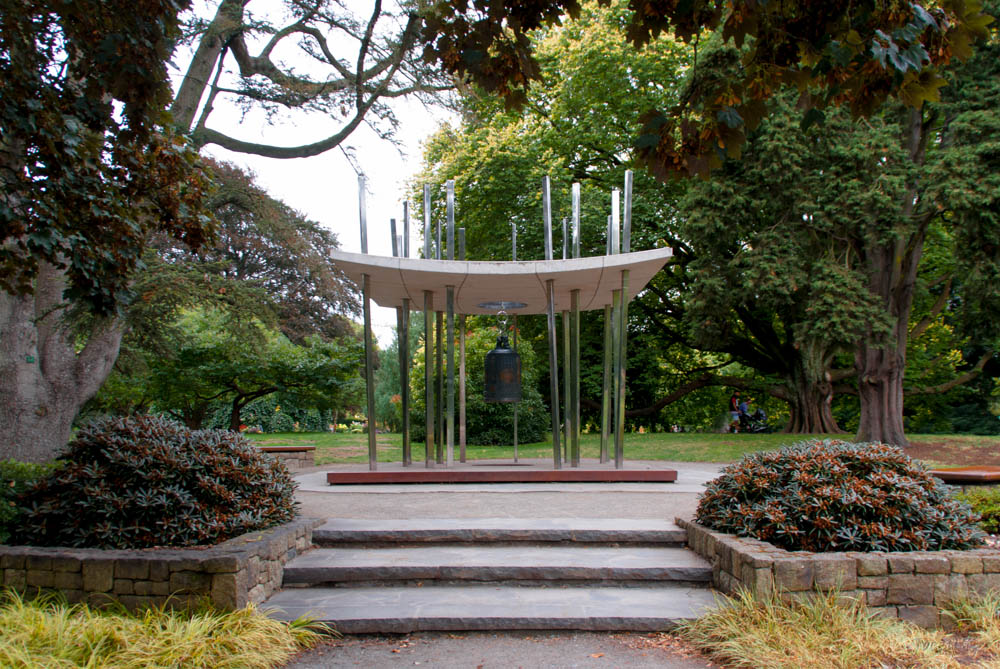
Reverting 'Louis van Houtte' behind the New Zealand World Peace Bell, Christchurch Botanic Gardens, Hagley Park (2014)

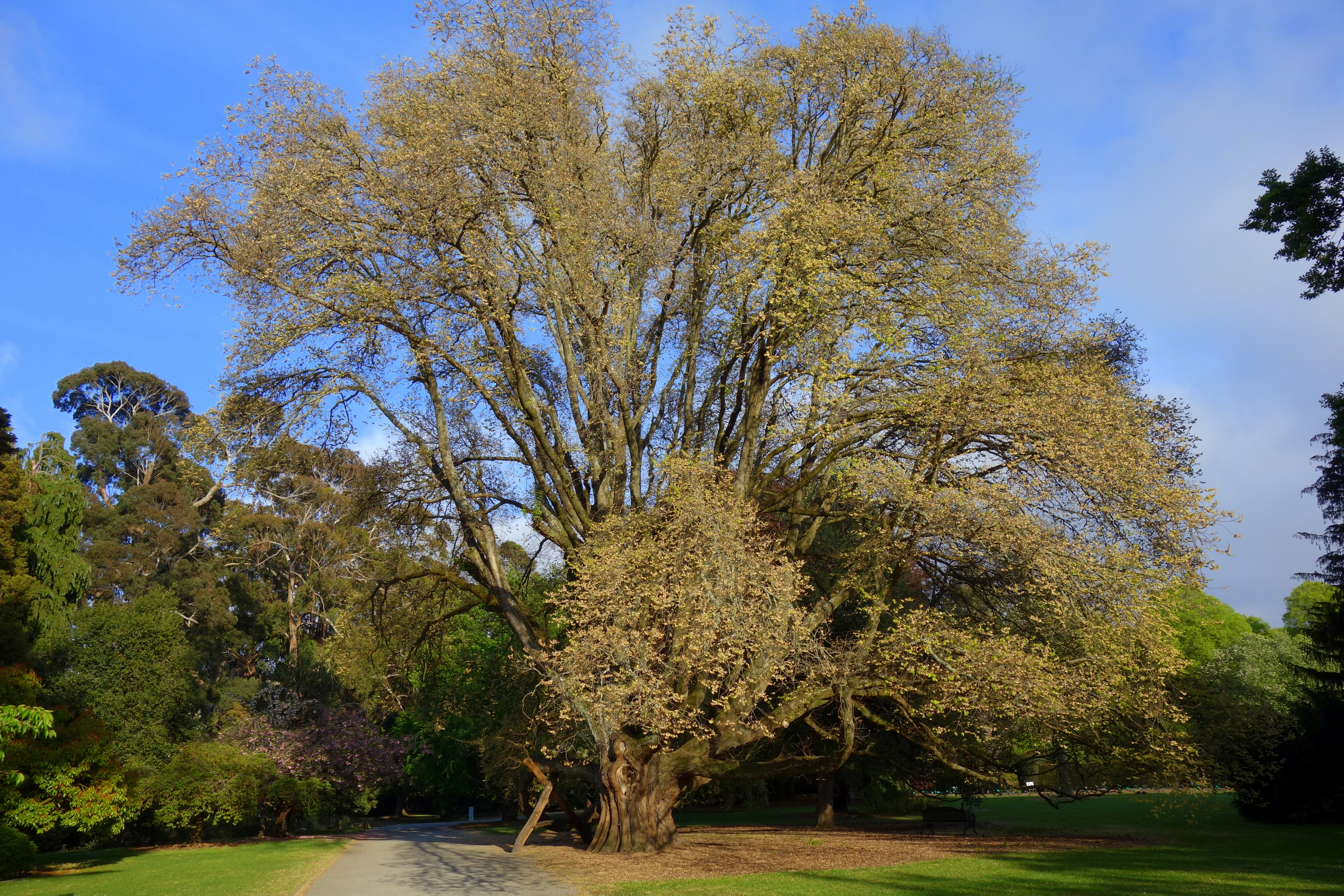
'Louis van Houtte' fruiting, October, Christchurch Botanic Gardens (2024)

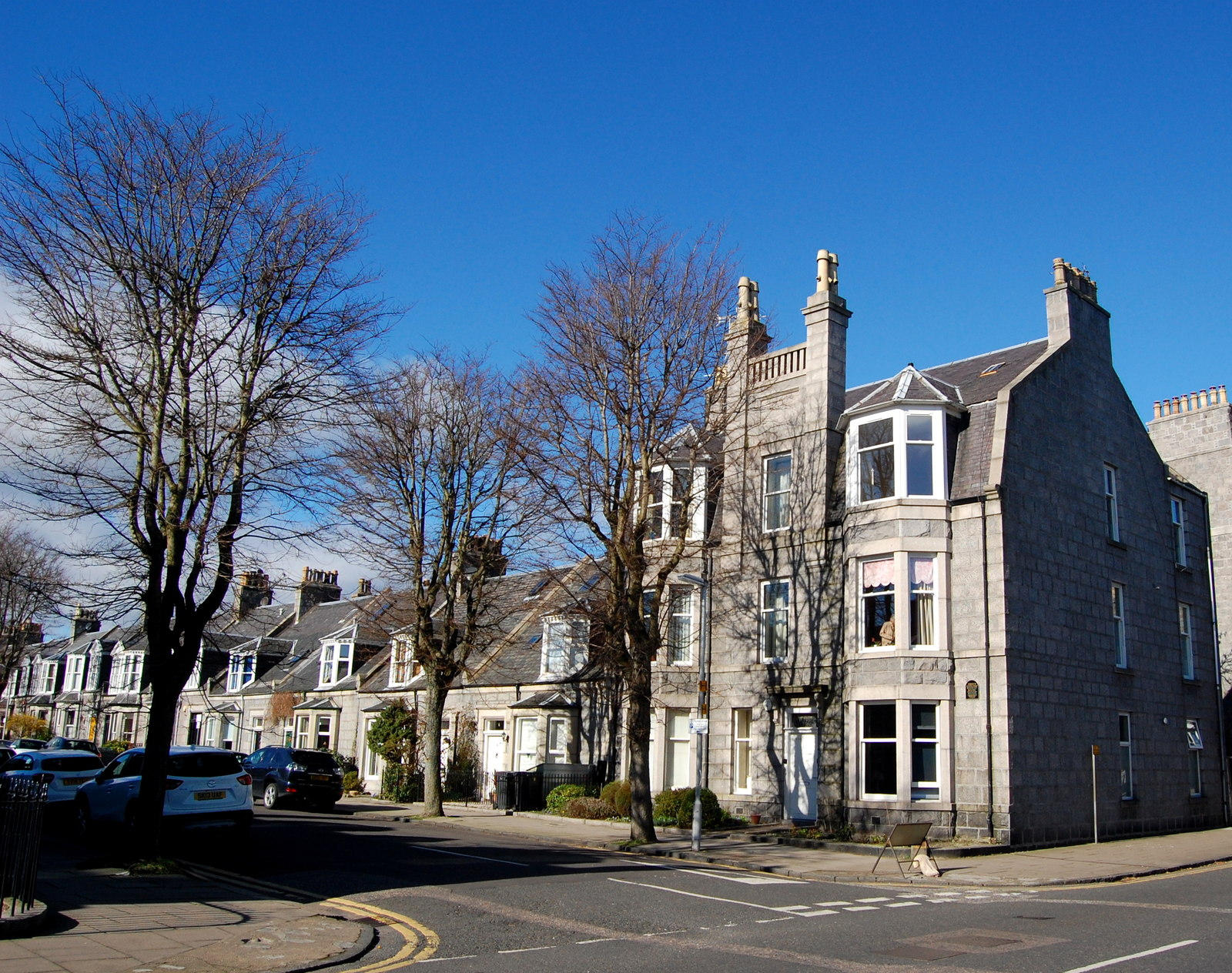
Pruned 'Louis van Houtte', Osborne Place, Aberdeen (2014)

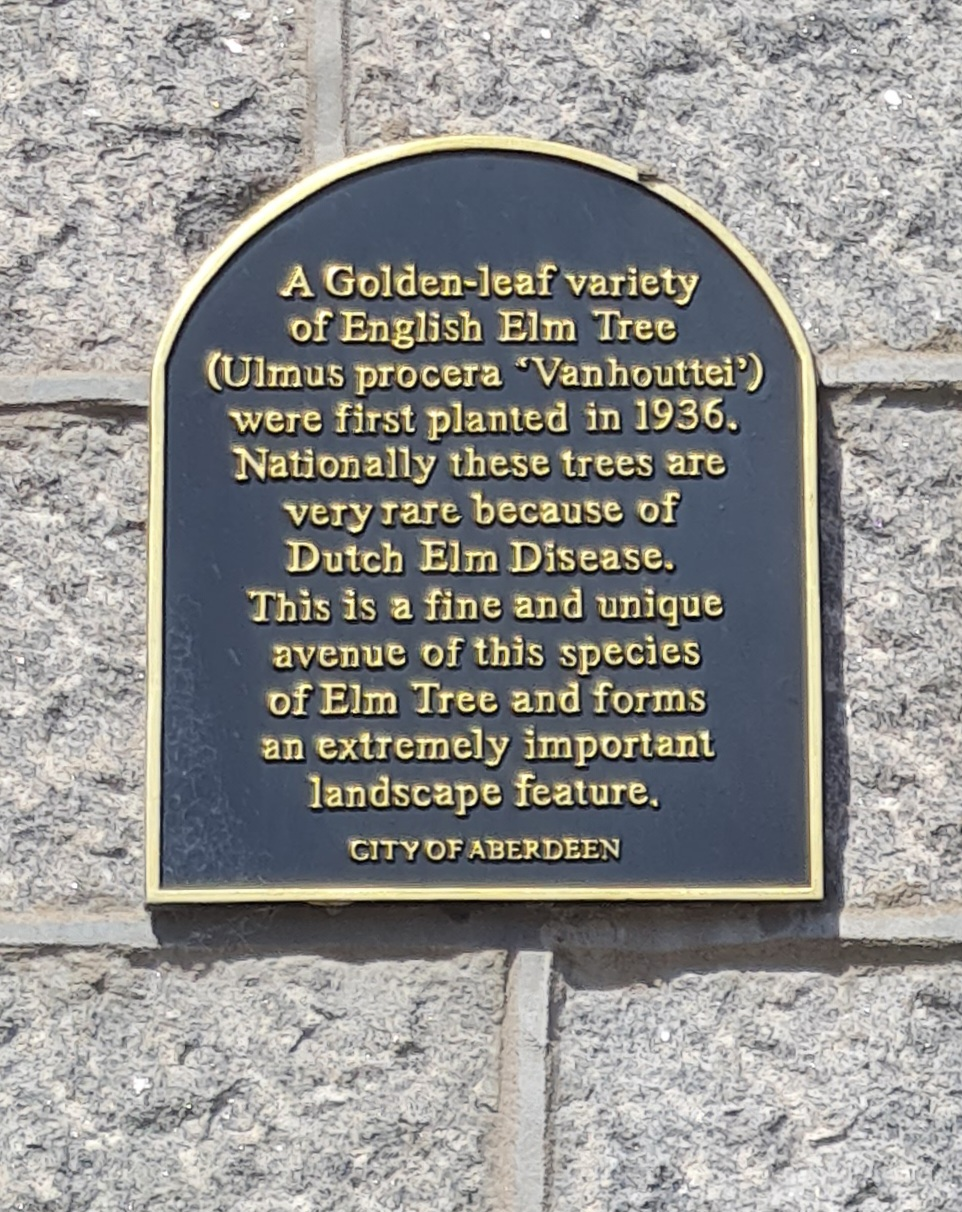
A 2023 plaque on Osborne Place, Aberdeen commemorating the avenue of elm trees

== Synonymy ==
- 'Ludwig van Houtte': Spath-Buch, 1720–1920, 229, 1921, in error.
- Ulmus montana lutescens van Houttei: Schelle in Beissner et al., Handbuch der Laubholz-Benennung 86. 1903, in error.
- Ulmus minor foliis flavescentibus: Miller, The Gardeners Dictionary ed. 2. 1735, Ulmus no. 8.

== Accessions ==
=== North America ===
None known.

=== Europe ===
- Brighton & Hove City Council, UK. NCCPG Elm Collection. UK champion: Carden Park, 21 m high, 61 cm d.b.h. (1996).
- Grange Farm Arboretum, Lincolnshire, UK. Acc. no. 1134, as U. minor 'Louis van Houtte'.
- National Botanic Gardens (Ireland), Glasnevin, Dublin. Location A3 (156)

=== Australasia ===
- Royal Botanic Gardens Victoria (Melbourne), Australia
- Christchurch Botanic Gardens, Christchurch, New Zealand. 1 tree, details not known.
- Eastwoodhill Arboretum , Gisborne, New Zealand. 2 trees, details not known.
- Manukau Cemetery, Papatoetoe, Auckland, New Zealand. 1 tree.

== Nurseries ==
=== Europe ===
- Centrum voor Botanische Verrijking vzw, Kampenhout, Belgium.
- Noordplant Nurserys, Glimmen, Netherlands

=== North America ===
- Foothills Nursery, Mt. Airy, North Carolina, United States
