= The Tree Register =

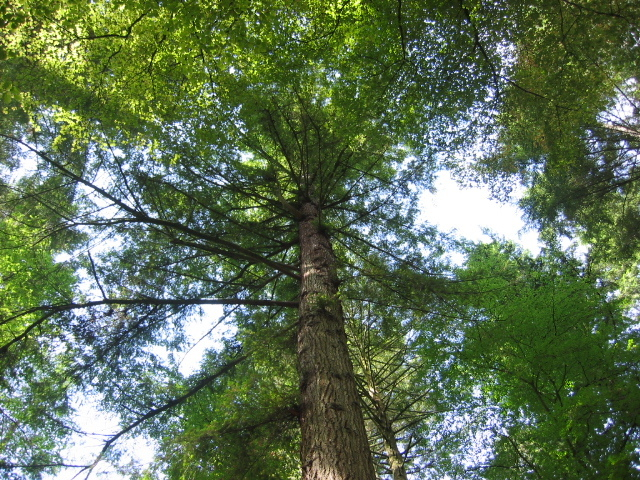
Looking up the trunk of a tall Douglas-fir at The Hermitage, Dunkeld, 63 metres tall in 2009.

The Tree Register, or more fully, the Tree Register of the British Isles (T.R.O.B.I.), is a registered charity run by volunteers, collating and updating a database of notable trees throughout Britain and Ireland. It comprises a computer database which in 2022 contained details of 250,000 trees. It was established in 1988 by co-founders Vicky Hallett, who later became Vicky Schilling, and Alan Mitchell, the internationally acclaimed dendrologist.

The register contains computerised data from the original hand-written records of the two founders together with other historical records taken from reference works going back more than 200 years. Recent height and girth measurements can be compared to those recorded by the likes of Loudon (1830s), Elwes and Henry (early 1900s) and the Hon. Maynard Greville (1950s), providing a valuable record of growth rates. The Tree Register was one of the founders of the Ancient Tree Hunt campaign.

After Schilling died, the Vicky Schilling Bursary Award was set up by The Tree Register to support the work of volunteer tree recorders.

From 2015 to 2023, over 10,000 sets of measurements were added by the Registrar to the Tree Register database most years, thus ensuring that it remains the largest database of its type in the world.

In 2024, The Tree Register produced its first Yearbook for 2023-24. The Yearbook was sponsored by Sir Paul McCartney.

== See also ==
- The Tree Council
- Champion Trees
