= Ulmus 'Scampstoniensis' =

Elm cultivar

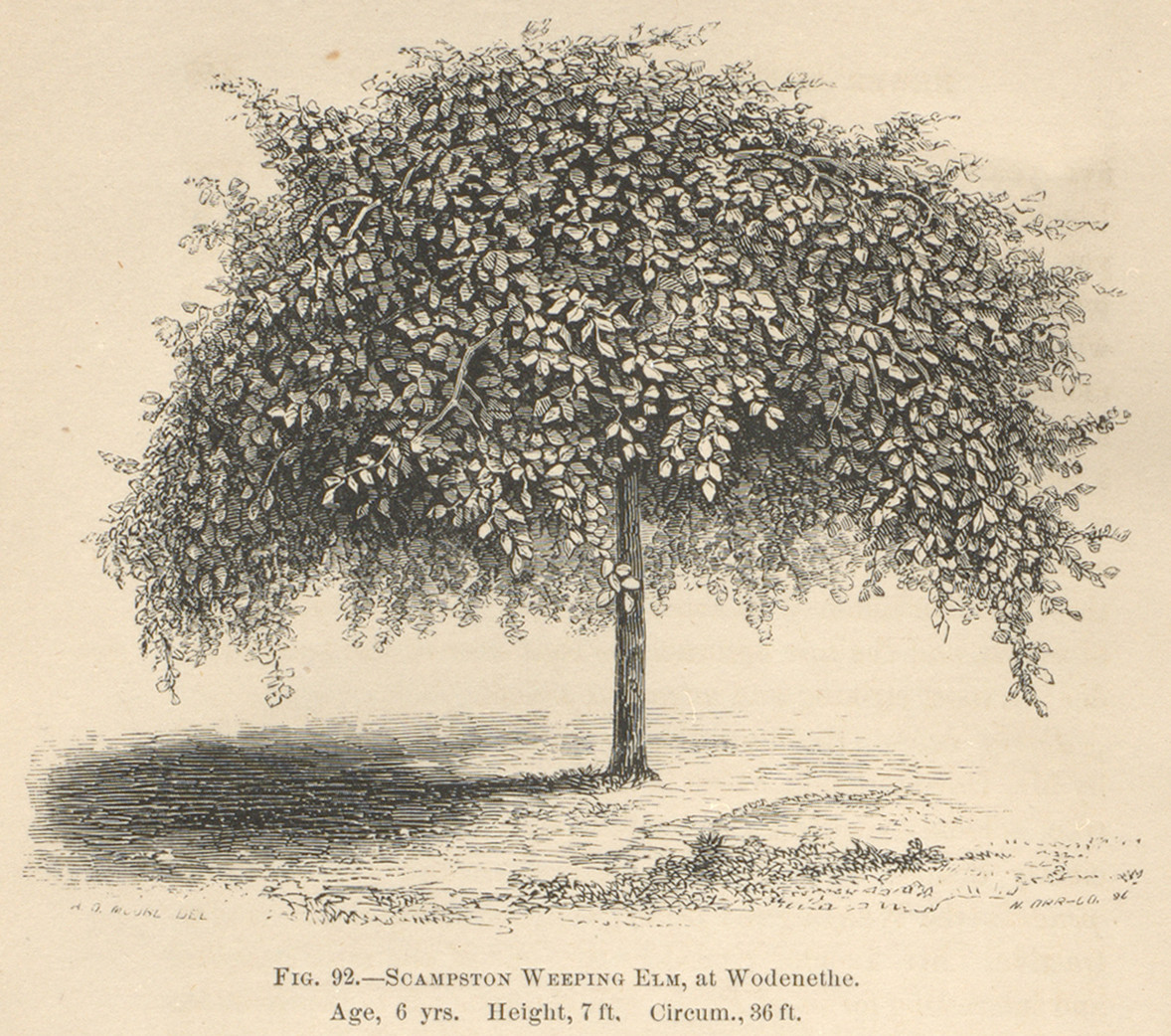
- Scampston Elm aged 6 years, Wodenethe, New York (1859)
- Genus: Ulmus
- Cultivar: 'Scampstoniensis'
- Origin: England

The elm cultivar Ulmus 'Scampstoniensis', the Scampston Elm or Scampston Weeping Elm, is said to have come from Scampston Hall, Yorkshire, England, before 1810. Loudon opined that a tree of the same name at the Royal Horticultural Society's Garden in 1834, 18 feet (5.5 m) high at 8 years old "differed little from the species" (i.e. the smooth-leaved elm, his U. glabra [:Ulmus minor ]). Henry described the tree, from a specimen growing in Victoria Park, Bath, as "a weeping form of U. nitens" [:Ulmus minor ]; however Green considered it "probably a form of Ulmus × hollandica". Writing in 1831, Loudon said that the tree was supposed to have originated in America. U. minor is not, however, an American species, so if the tree was brought from America, it must originally have been taken there from Europe. There was (and is) an 'American Plantation' (or 'America Plantation') at Scampston, which may be related to this supposition. A number of old specimens of 'Scampstoniensis' in this plantation were blown down in a great gale of October 1881; younger specimens were still present at Scampston in 1911.

Georg Dieck of the National Arboretum in Zöschen, Germany, considered 'Scampstoniensis' a synonym of Ulmus scabra Serpentina [see U. × hollandica 'Serpentina' ], a view rejected by Petzold, who in his Arboretum Muscaviense listed 'Scampstoniensis' separately, and by the Hortus Botanicus Leiden, which had a specimen of 'Scampstoniensis' (see below). "From the Travemünder Nurseries we received an U. scampstoniensis, an elm with a beautiful pendulous shape," wrote Petzold, "that we distinguish from our U. montana Pendula."

== Description ==
'Scampstoniensis' was said to droop its branches very distinctly and regularly, giving the tree a symmetrical form, as though it had been regularly trained and trimmed, unlike 'Camperdownii', which had less of a tendency to regular drooping, and with less abundant foliage. A 1911 article in 'Historical Notes of Rillington and Scampston' described 'Scampstoniensis' as "remarkable for its size when mature, for its spreading habit, and its rough corky bark".

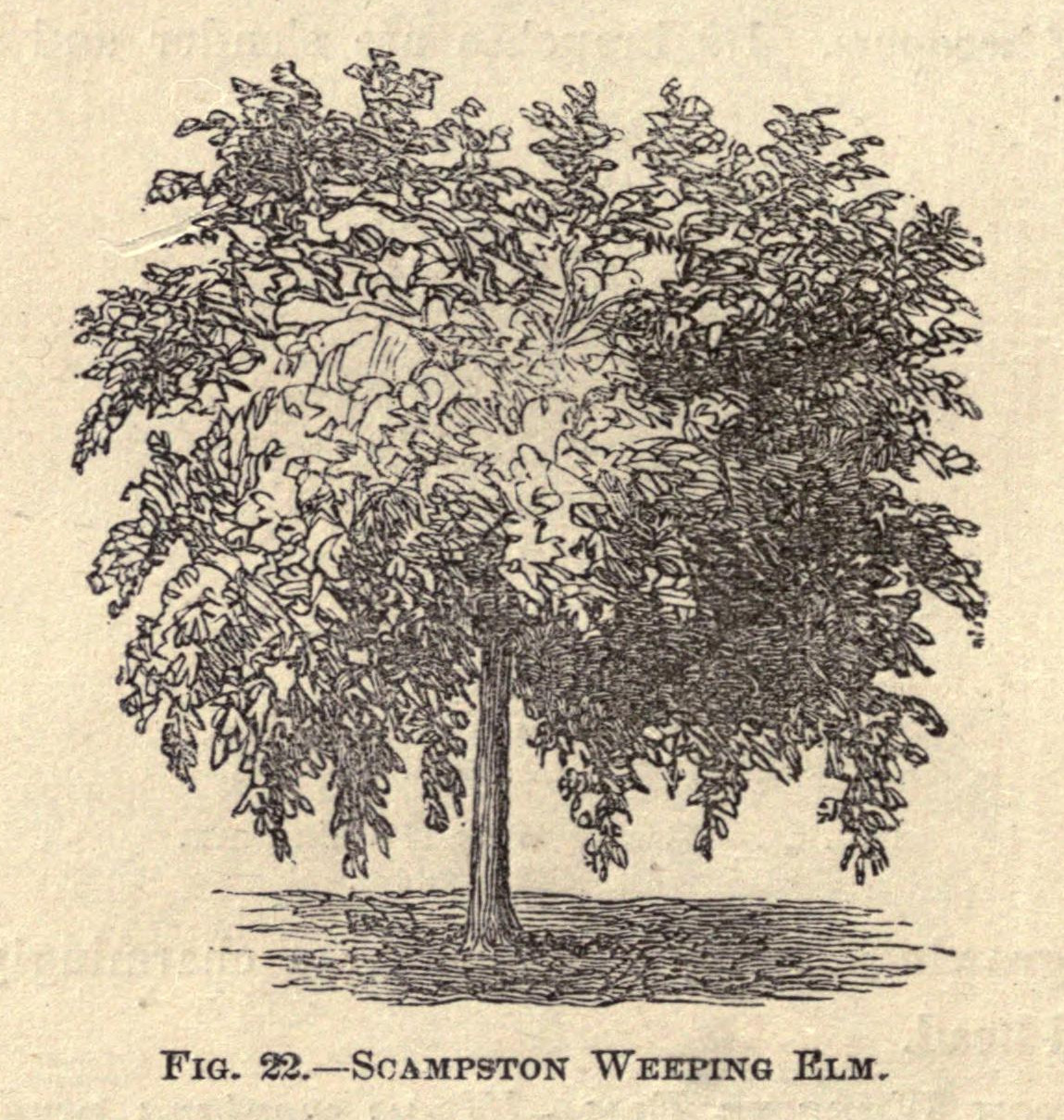
Scampston Weeping Elm, a drawing of 1868

== Pests and diseases ==
'Scampstoniensis' is not noted to have any resistance to Dutch elm disease.

== Cultivation ==
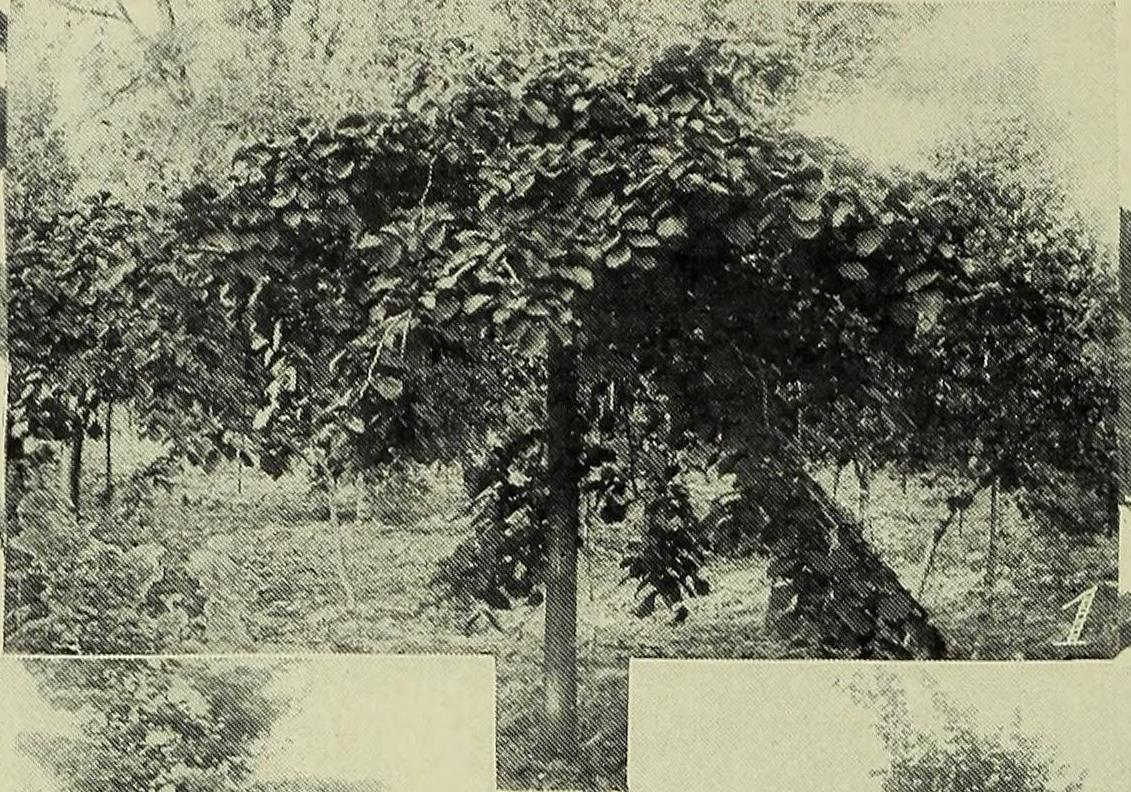
A Scampston-like tree sold at Peterson Nursery, Chicago, 1909, as 'American Weeping Elm'

Loudon described the Scampston Elm, in a letter of 1836 to the Newcastle Courant, as "generally understood to have been extensively planted in Northumberland about 80 years ago". The Scampston Elm was in cultivation on both sides of the Atlantic in the 19th century and was occasionally referred to as Ulmus americana pendula. (Other European elms described as 'American' by various nurseries include 'Vegeta', 'Lutescens', and 'Nana'.) The American horticulturalist Frank Jesup Scott in The Art of Beautifying Suburban Home Grounds of Small Extent (1870) described how two "Scampston elms" could be pruned and trained to form an archway of weeping elm. "A weeping variety of the Scampston Elm" was described at the Royal Victoria Park, Bath, in 1857 and 1902, where was listed as U. montana Glabra [:'smooth'(-leaved)] microphylla pendula. One tree was planted in 1896 as U. glabra scampstoniensis at the Dominion Arboretum, Ottawa, Canada. Three specimens supplied by the Späth nursery of Berlin to the Royal Botanic Garden Edinburgh in 1902 as U. glabra [:'smooth'(-leaved)] Scampstoniensis may survive in Edinburgh, as it was the practice of the Garden to distribute trees about the city (viz. the Wentworth Elm). (Note: The current list of Living Accessions held in the Garden per se does not list the plant.) A specimen obtained from Späth before 1914 as U. glabra scampstoniensis, and planted in 1916, stood in the Ryston Hall arboretum, Norfolk, in the early 20th century. Elwes saw the decayed stump of the original tree at Scampston Hall, by which time (1913) the tree was no longer known to be in cultivation in nurseries in England. 'Scampstoniensis' continued to be distributed by the Späth nursery and the Hesse Nursery of Weener, Germany, into the 1930s. It was present in The Hague (listed as Ulmus hollandica scampstoniensis) in that decade.

Possibly only two specimens now survive in the UK, as grafted trees, in Brighton, England; see 'Notable trees' below. Another possible specimen stands in Fort Street, Cambridge, Waikato, New Zealand.

A clone cultivated in China as Ulmus americana 'Pendula', top-grafted on Ulmus pumila stock, is neither Ulmus americana nor Scampston elm (formerly mis-named Ulmus americana 'Pendula'), but, in the case of the majority of photographs on the Plant Photo Bank of China, a weeping form of U. glabra Huds., probably 'Camperdownii'.

== Notable trees ==
A weeping elm in the Hortus Botanicus Leiden was described there by the curator in 1890 in a Sempervirens article as an Ulmus americana Pendula, one of the synonyms of 'Scampstoniensis'. It was carefully distinguished by him from two forms of weeping wych elm nearby, and was said to produce, in addition, vigorous ascending branches that needed regular pruning to maintain a tidy weeping shape. Three weeping elms were later photographed in the Hortus c.1920, two of them forms of weeping wych, the third a semi-weeping elm with smaller leaves and numerous long shoots, many ascending, that appears at one time to have been pruned: by process of elimination, the Ulmus americana Pendula ('Scampstoniensis') of the 1890 Sempervirens article. The c.1920 tree, though mature, closely resembles the 1859 illustration of a young 'Scampstoniensis' in New York, while a 1931 Ulmus americana pendula herbarium specimen from Leiden matches the 1902 Späth 'Scampstoniensis' specimens held in RBGE. The 1890 article had expressed doubts about the name Ulmus americana Pendula; the c.1920 photograph labels the tree U. scabra [our U. glabra] pendula, despite its differences from the two weeping wych clones. The herbarium of the Naturalis Biodiversity Center in Leiden holds leaf specimens labelled "U. carpinifolia 'Pendula' (formerly called U. glabra Hudson 'Scampstoniensis')", from a tree in the Wageningen Arboretum.

The possible UK TROBI Champions grow in Woodvale Cemetery, Brighton, perhaps planted in 1851; two grafted trees, survivors of some ten c.1980, measuring 26 m high by 73 cm d.b.h., and 22 m by 70 cm, in 2002. One of the two lost half its crown in a storm of 2016. Their leaves are a good match for herbarium leaf-specimens of 'Scampstoniensis' (Späth) held in the RBGE, and their prolific long shoots match those of the Leiden tree.

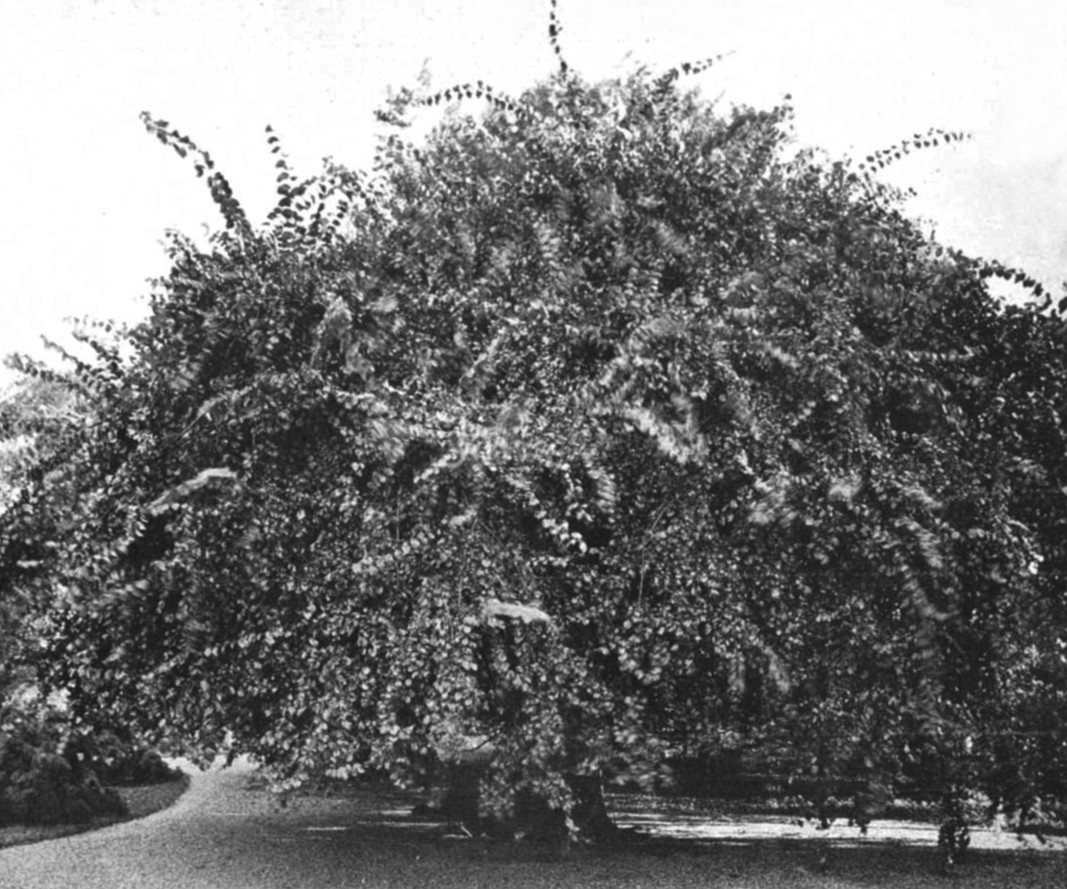
A heavily pruned semi-weeping elm in the Hortus Botanicus Leiden (c.1920), possibly the U. americana Pendula [:'Scampstoniensis'] of the 'Three Weeping Elms' article, 1890

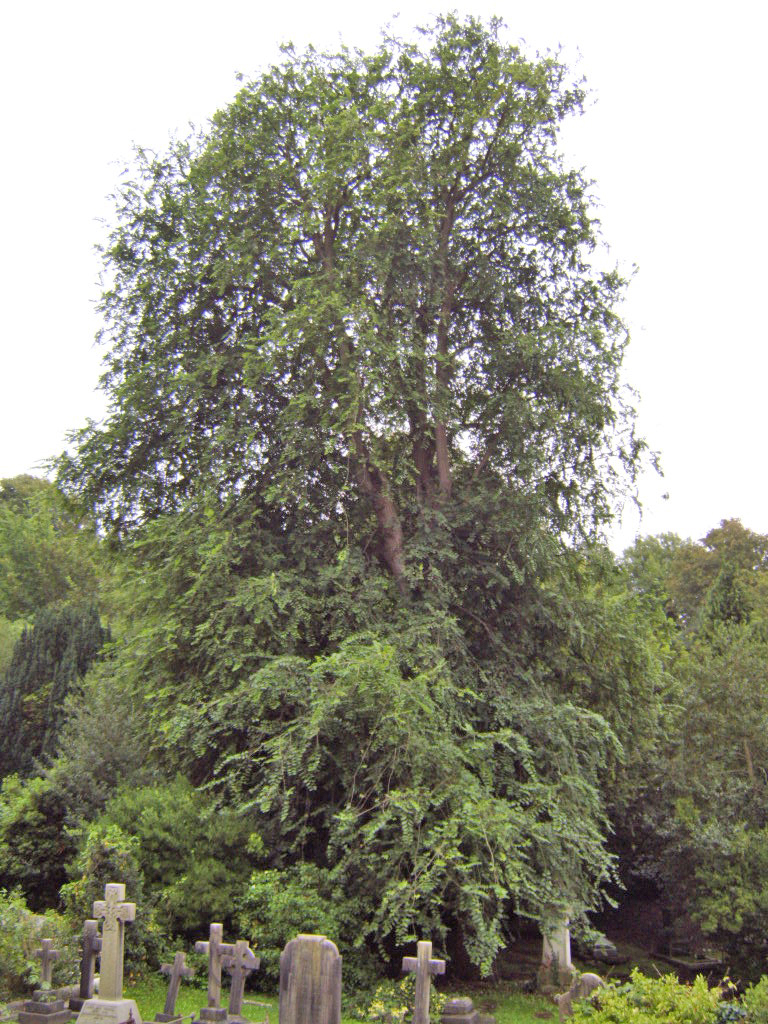
Woodvale Cemetery tree, Brighton (2005), showing prolific long shoots

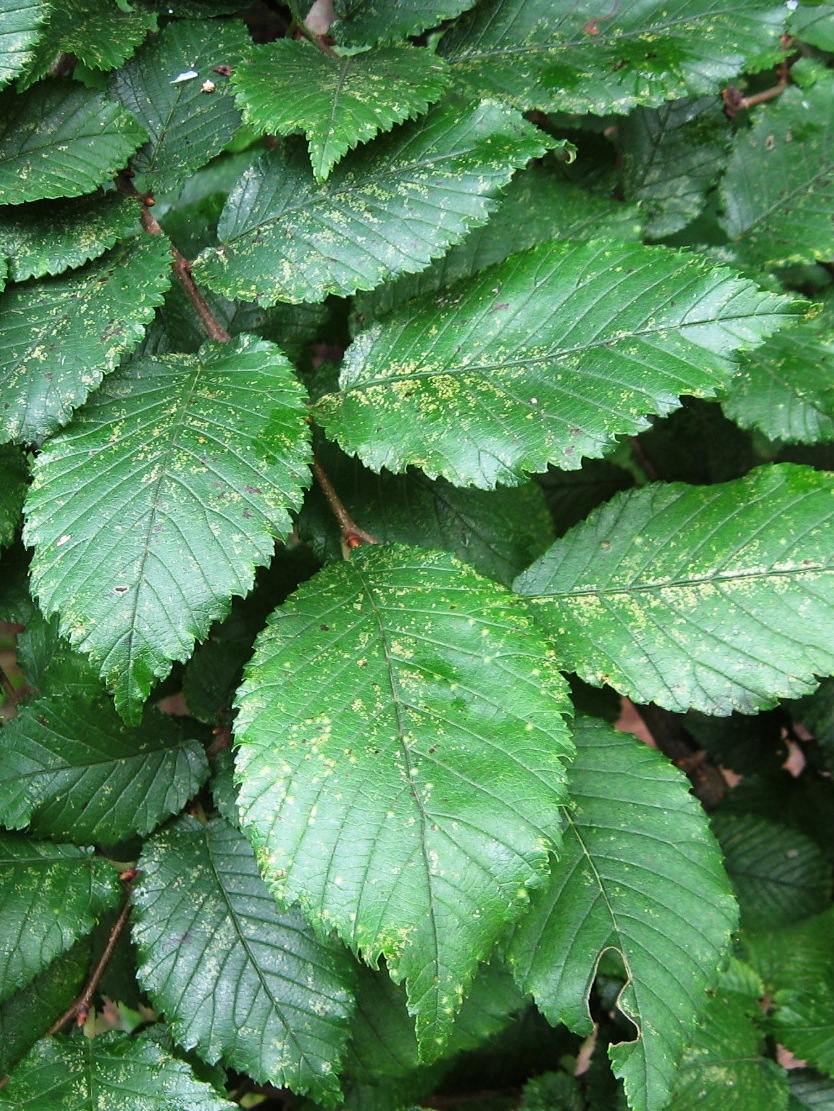
Leaves of Woodvale Cemetery tree, Brighton

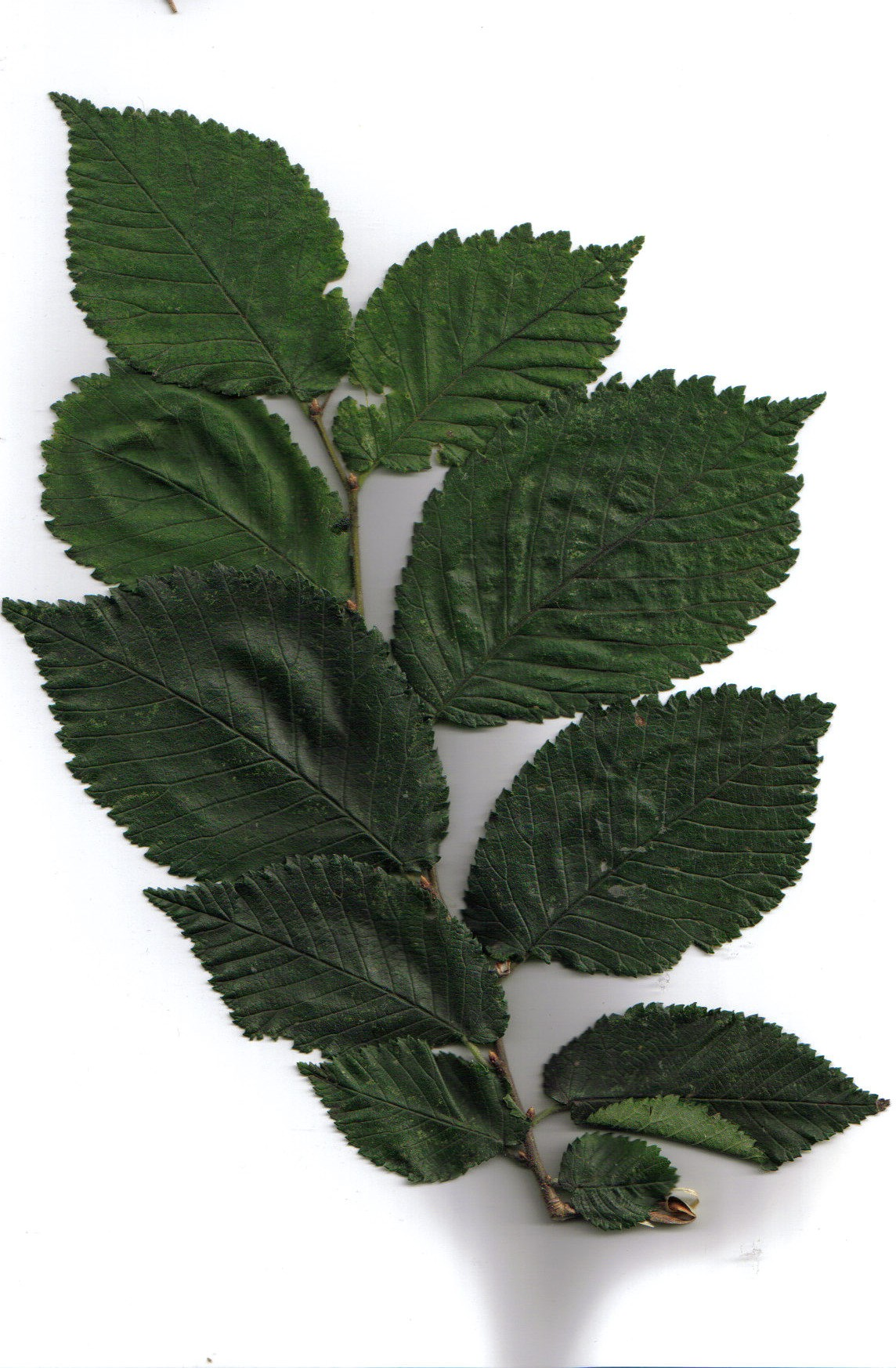
Long-shoot leaf-spray of same

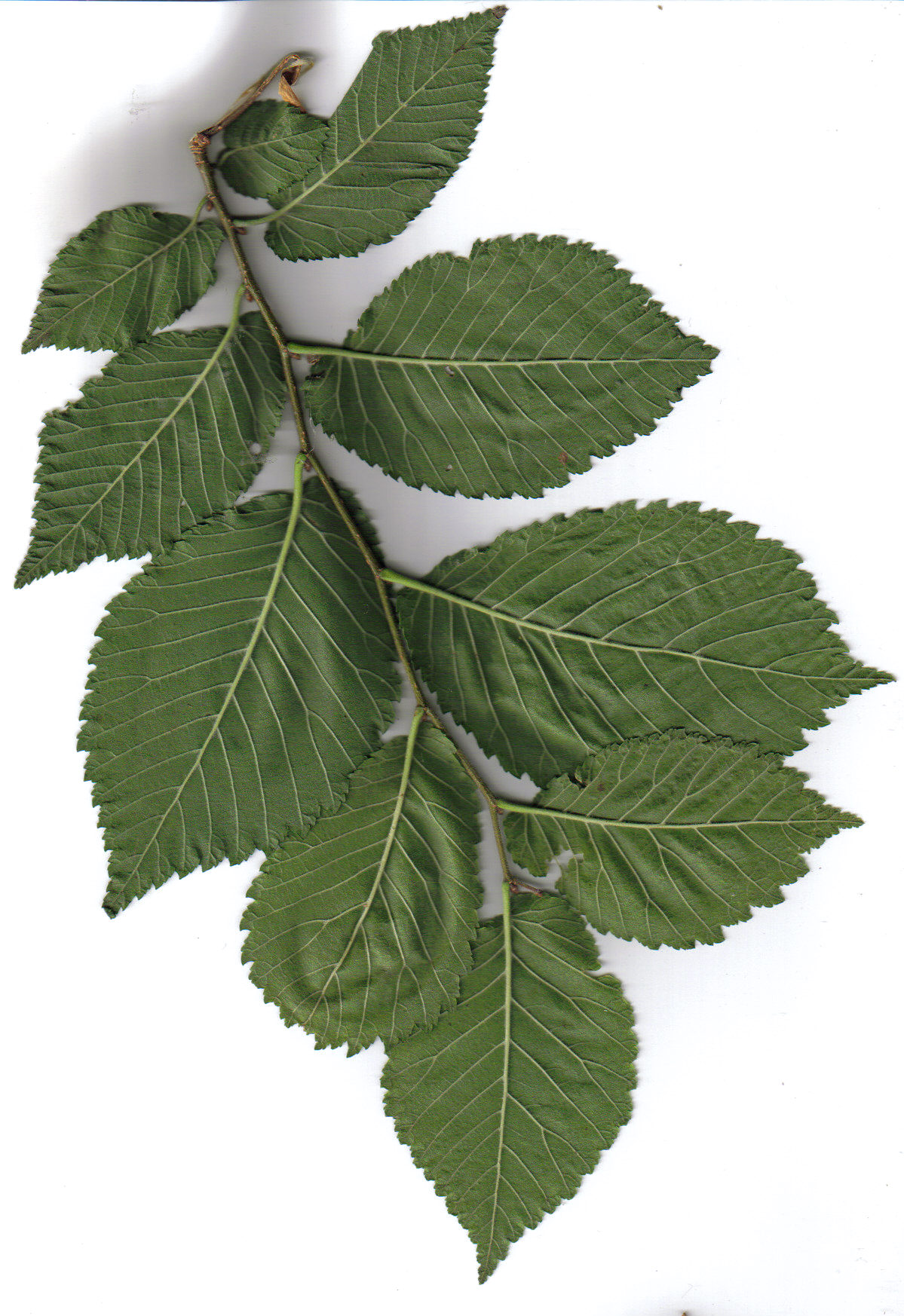
Underside

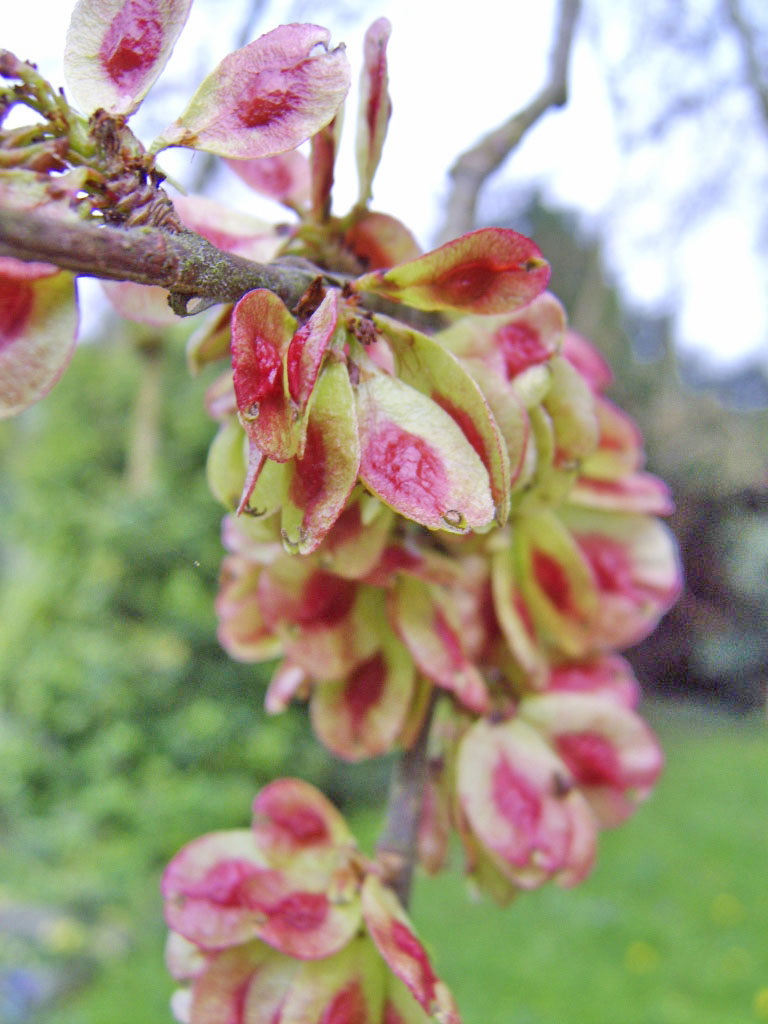
Samarae of same

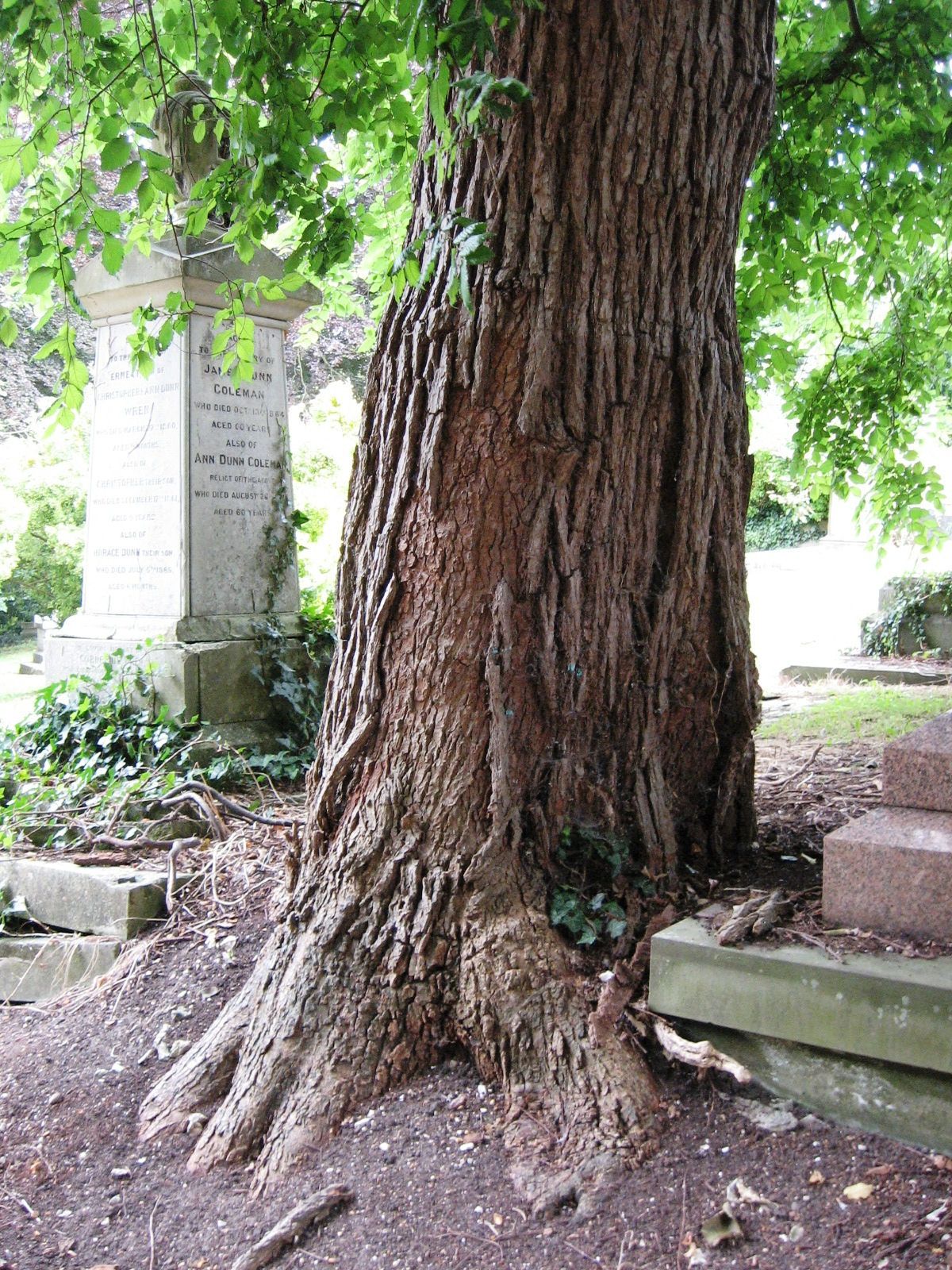
Bole of same

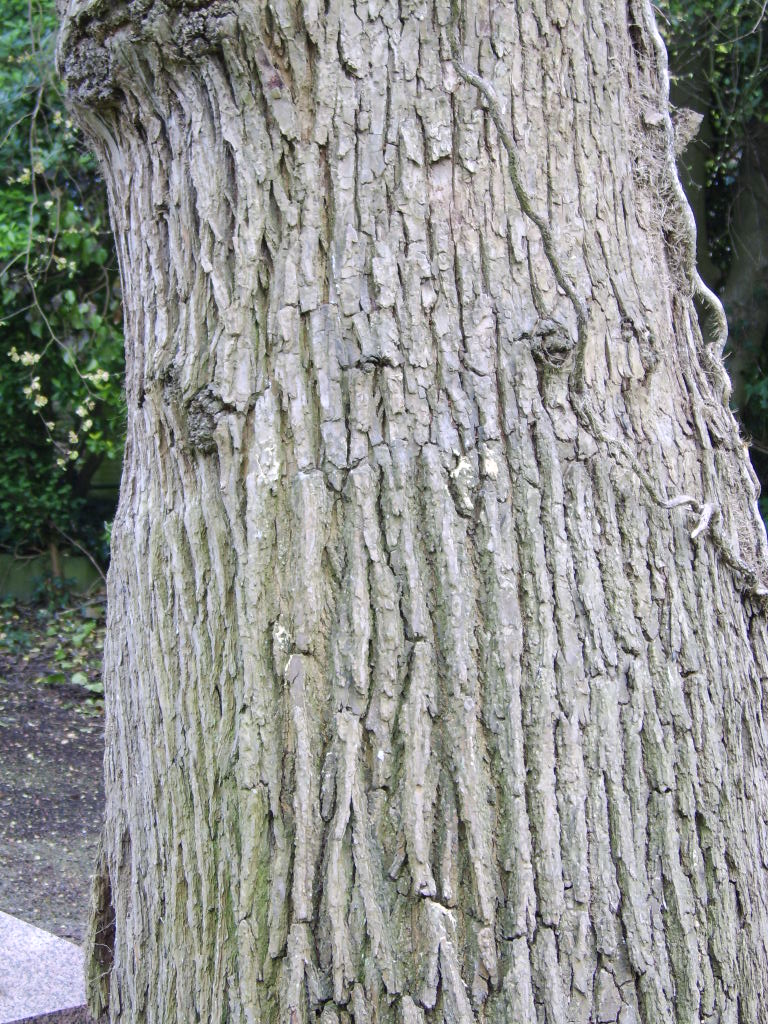
'Scampstoniensis' bark, above the graft line

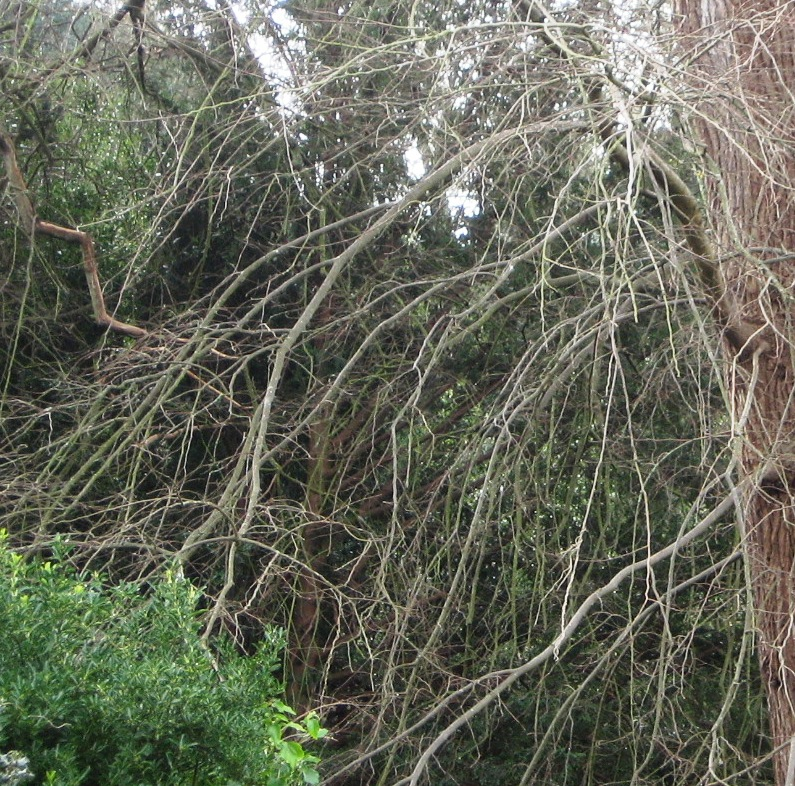
Pendulous branchlets

== Synonymy ==
- Ulmus glabra var. scampstoniensis: Kirchner, in Petzold & Kirchner, Arboretum Muscaviense 560, 1864.
- Ulmus americana pendula
- Ulmus montana pendula nova

== Accessions ==
=== North America ===
- Dominion Arboretum, Ottawa, Canada. Accession no. 2594
