= Ulmus glabra 'Camperdownii' =

Elm cultivar

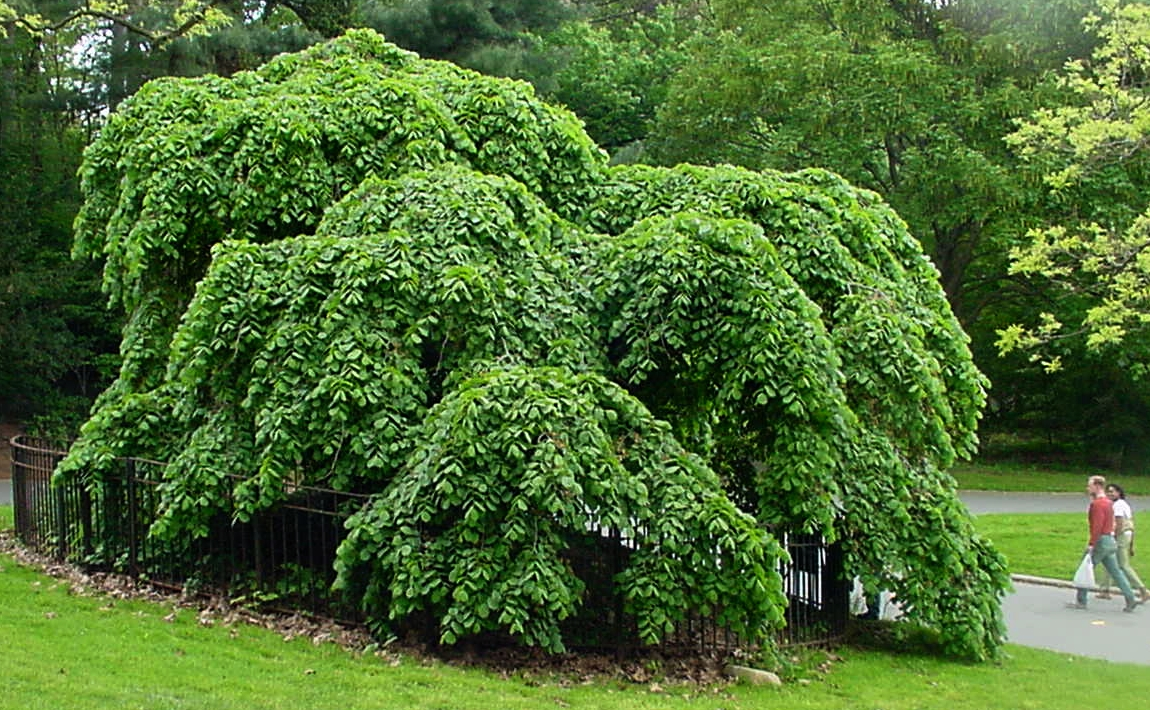
- Camperdown Elm, Prospect Park (Brooklyn)
- Species: Ulmus glabra
- Cultivar: 'Camperdownii'
- Origin: Scotland

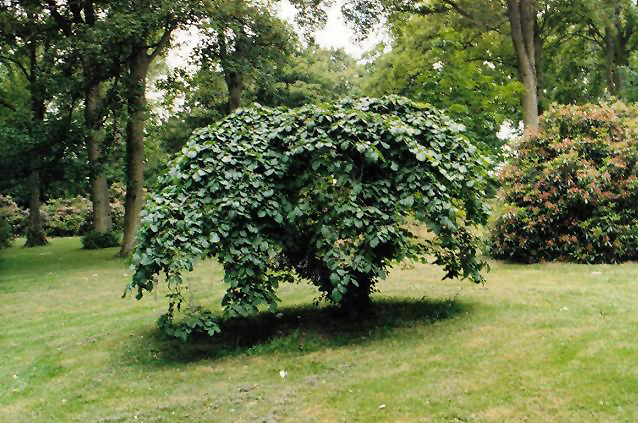
The original Camperdown Elm, replanted near the location of its discovery c.1840 in Camperdown Park, Dundee; image taken in 1989

The Wych Elm cultivar Ulmus glabra 'Camperdownii', commonly known as the Camperdown Elm, was discovered about 1835–1840 (often mis-stated as '1640') as a young contorted elm (a sport) growing in the forest at Camperdown House, in Dundee, Scotland, by the Earl of Camperdown's head forester, David Taylor. The young tree was lifted and replanted within the gardens of Camperdown House where it remains to this day. The original tree, which grows on its own roots, is less than 3 m tall, with a weeping habit and contorted branch structure. The earl's gardener is said to have produced the first of what are commonly recognised as Camperdown elms by grafting a cutting to the trunk of a wych elm (U. glabra).

Henry and Bean record that in early days both 'Camperdownii' and a reportedly similar-looking cultivar called 'Serpentina' were marketed as U. montana pendula nova. Koch had listed an U. serpentina in 1872, and an U. montana serpentina was marketed in the late 19th century and early 20th by the Späth nursery in Berlin, and by the Ulrich nursery in Warsaw. In Späth catalogues between 1902 and 1920, 'Serpentina' appears while 'Camperdownii' is absent; by 1930 'Camperdownii' appears but 'Serpentina' is absent. This suggests that 'Serpentina' may have been a continental name for 'Camperdownii', and that Späth dropped the name 'Serpentina' c.1930 in favour of 'Camperdownii'. Elwes and Henry's failure to mention the serpentining branches of 'Camperdownii' may have contributed to the impression of two different trees. In this omission they were followed by Bean (1925; corrected 1981), Green (1964), Hillier (1972– 2002), Krüssmann (1976), and White (2003), the first four of whom, like Elwes and Henry, list 'Serpentina' as a cultivar distinct from 'Camperdownii'.

Although usually classed as a cultivar of wych elm, the tree was considered a nothomorph of Ulmus × hollandica 'Vegeta' by Green (1964).

The tree is sometimes confused with the 'Horizontalis' (Weeping Wych Elm) owing to both being given the epithet 'Pendula'.

== Description ==
The grafted Camperdown Elm slowly develops a broad, flat head that may eventually build as high as 4 m (13 feet), and a commensurately wide crown with a weeping habit. Its chief diagnostic feature is its contorted branching, what Mitchell (1982) called the "head of furiously twisting branches".

The ultimate size and form of 'Camperdownii' depends on such factors as latitude and location, on what part of the parent tree the cuttings come from, on the 'stock' on which it is grafted, and on possible continuing mutation. Specimens may therefore vary in appearance. Grown in lower latitudes like Victoria, Australia, the tree can attain a height and spread of over 13 m.

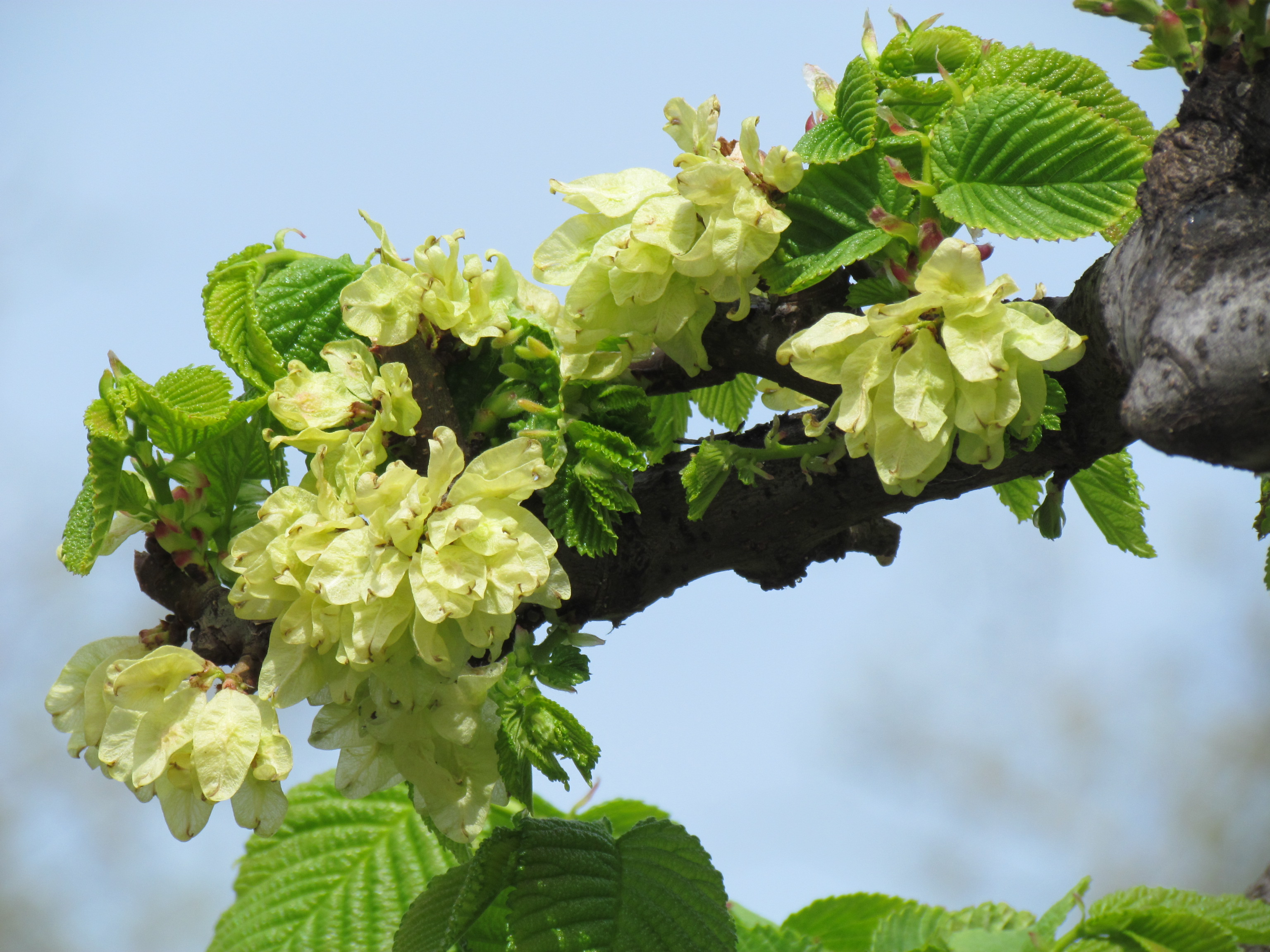
Distinctive narrow Camperdown samarae, showing the seed on the stalk side of centre (typical of wych)

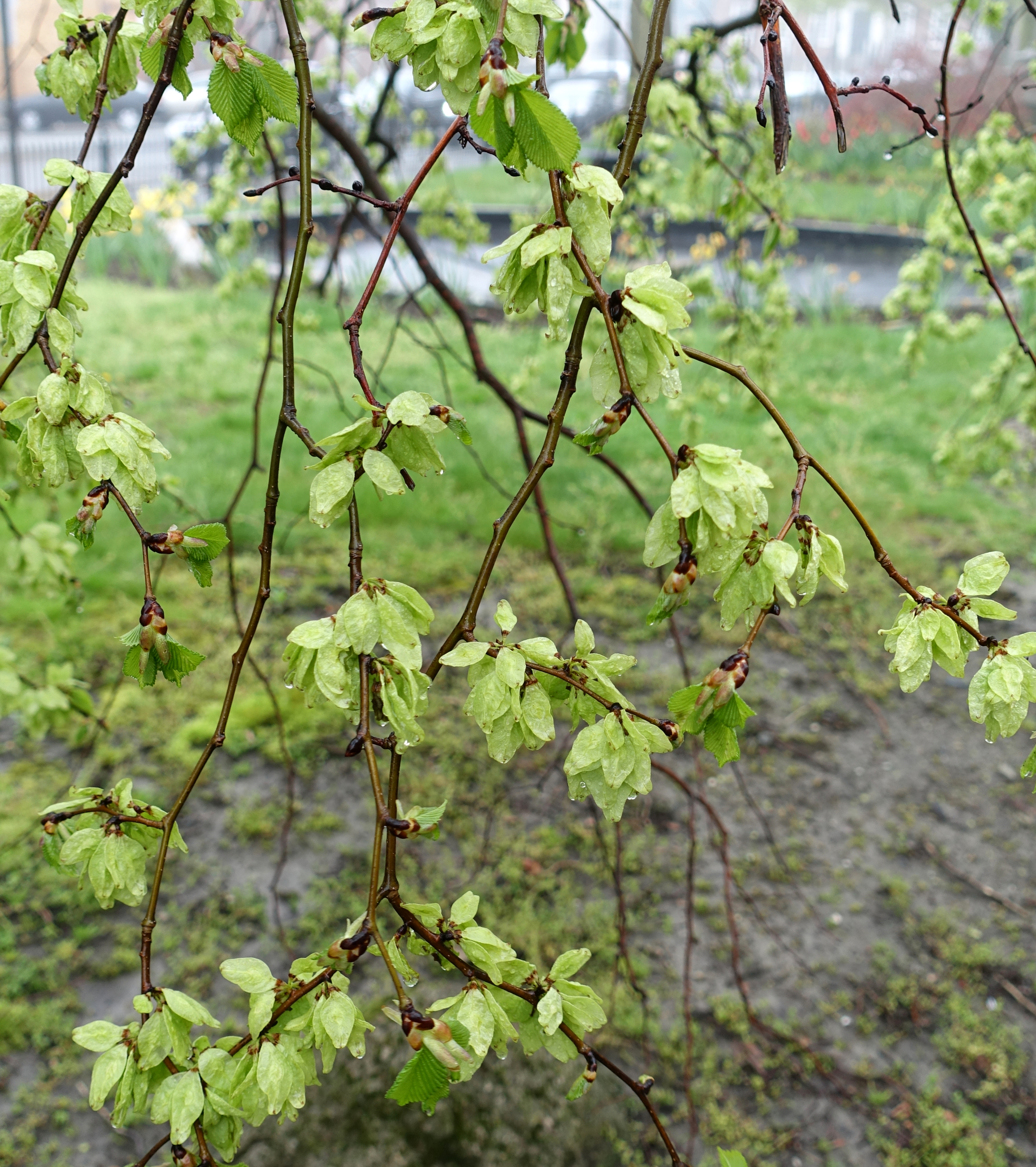
Camperdown samarae on pendulous branchlets

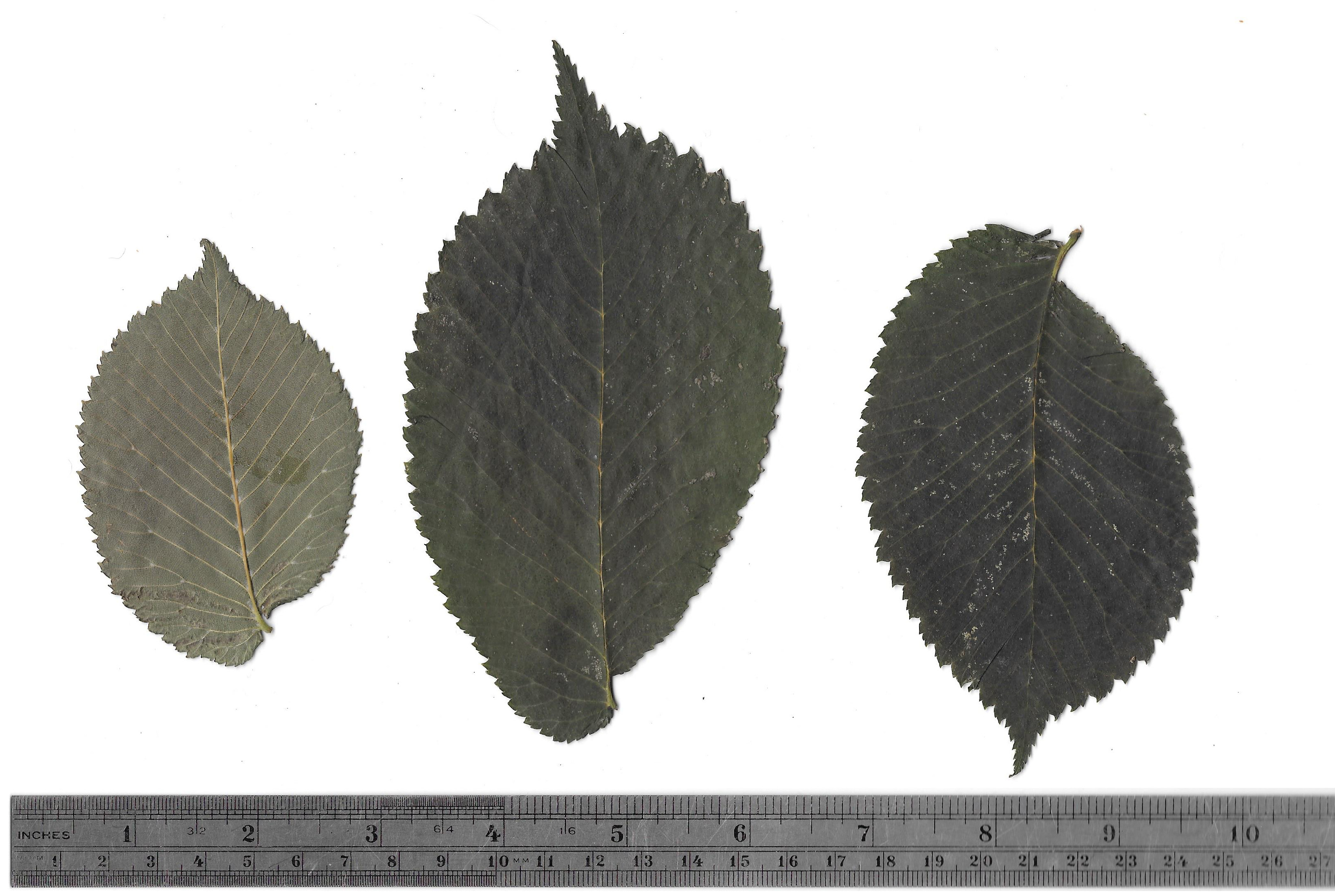
Dried short-shoot 'Camperdownii' leaves (August)

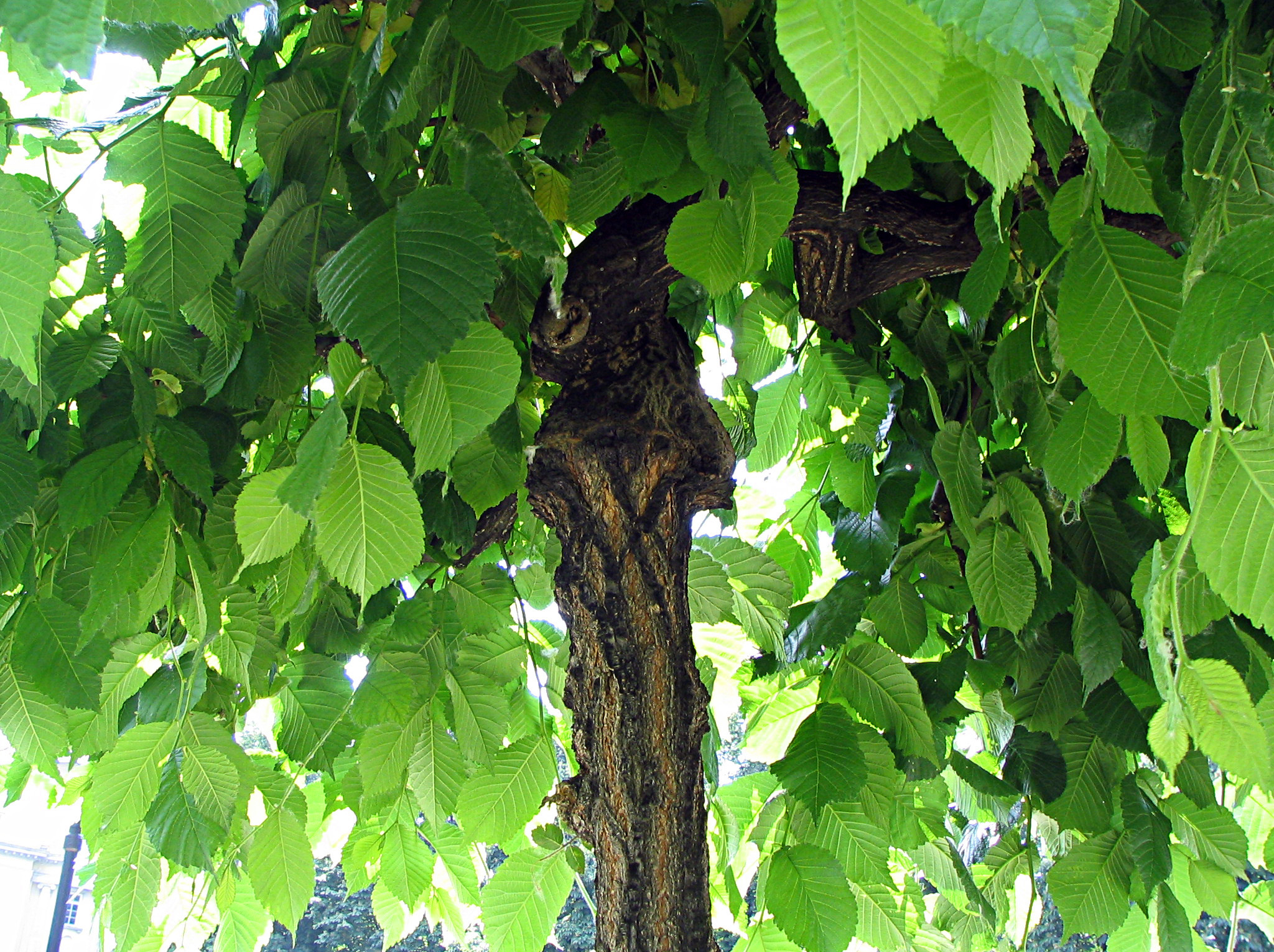
Camperdown Elm grafted on Siberian elm stock, Serbia

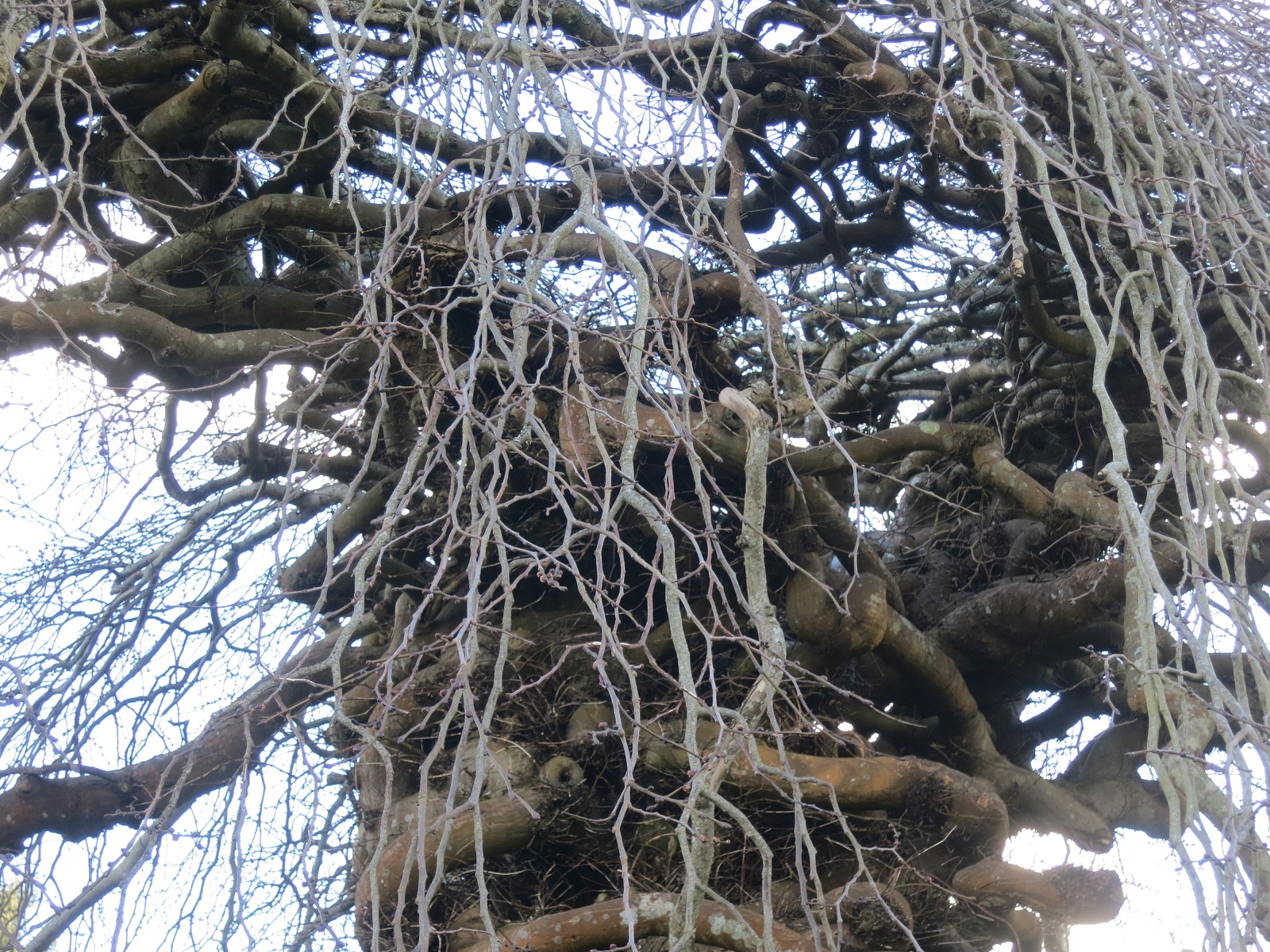
Extreme contortion in the trunk and branches of Camperdown Elm, Port Gamble, Washington

== Pests and diseases ==
'Camperdownii' is susceptible to Dutch elm disease, however, there are still many examples to be found in parks and gardens across the British Isles as it often avoids detection by the Scolytae beetle (a major vector of Dutch elm disease) because of its diminutive height. In North America it often escapes infection possibly because the American vectors of the disease do not feed on wych elm, however, its leaves are heavily damaged there by the elm leaf beetle Xanthogaleruca luteola, elm yellows , and disfigured by leaf-mining and leaf-rolling insects, such as the elm casebearer, Coleophora ulmifoliella .

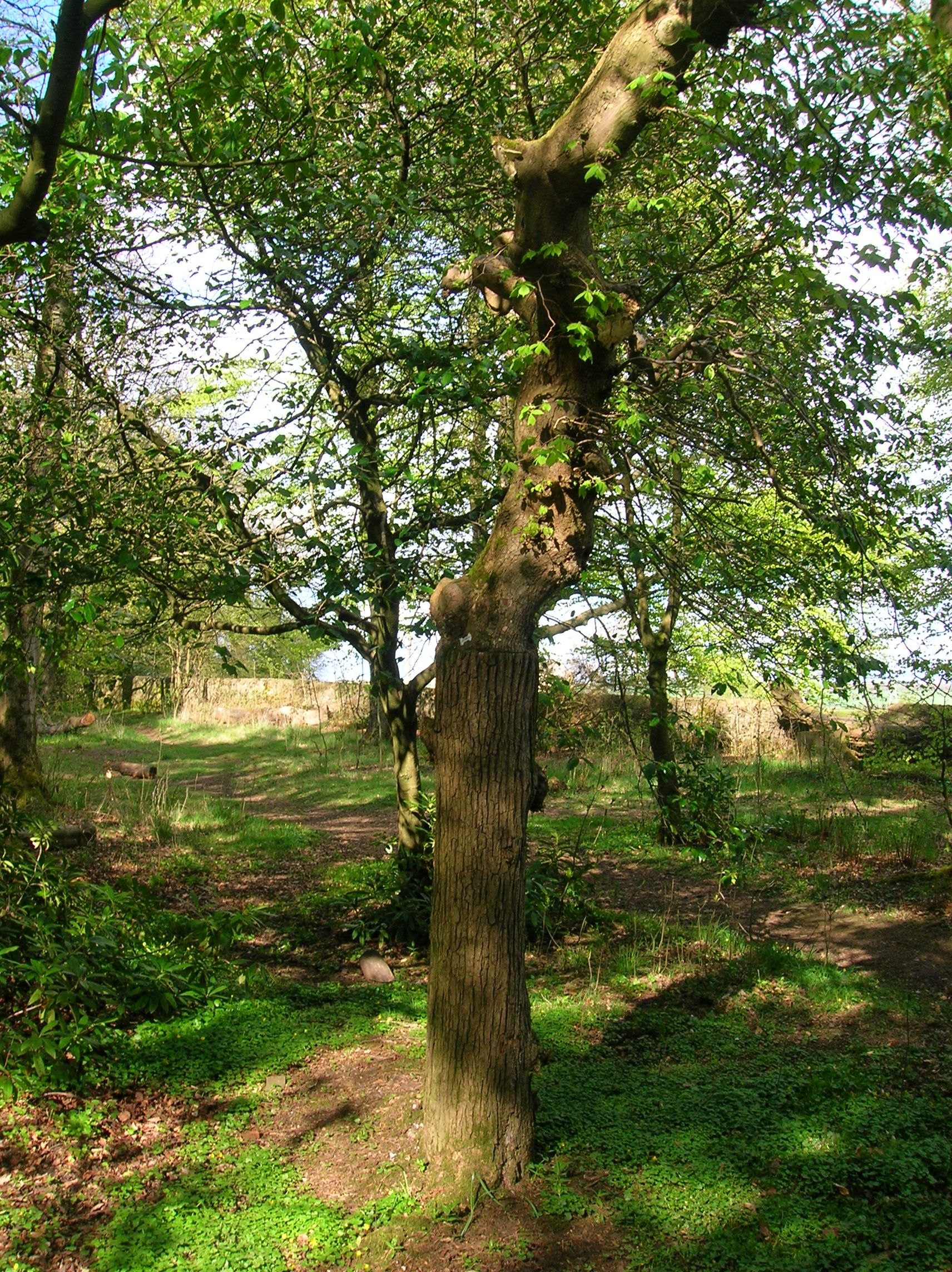
A Camperdown Elm at Spier's parklands that is infected with Rigidoporous ulmarius

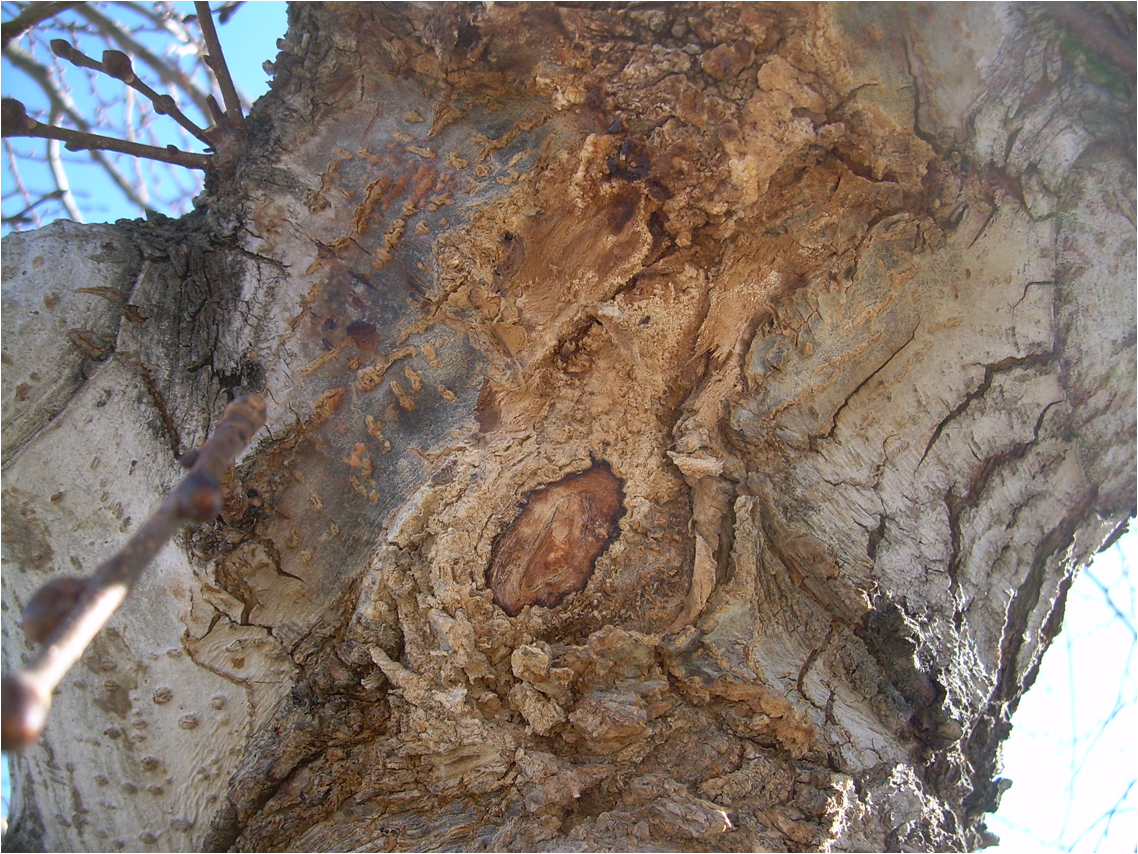
Slime flux on Camperdown Elm

== Cultivation ==
Every 'Camperdownii' is descended (through cuttings) from the original sport and usually grafted on a wych elm trunk. Other grafting stock has been used, including Dutch elm U. × hollandica, Siberian elm U. pumila, and English elm U. minor 'Atinia' (although this ultimately produces suckers).

Camperdown elms satisfied a mid-Victorian passion for curiosities in the 'Gardenesque' gardens then in vogue. Many examples were planted, as 'rarities', in Britain and America. There are many on university campuses, often planted as memorials, such as at the campus of the University of Idaho. Others featured in townscapes such as at the Lakeview Cemetery, Seattle, and Kripalu Yoga Center, Stockbridge, MA.

The tree was also introduced to Australia, where a number still survive, notably in Victoria, where it was marketed from 1873.

Camperdown Elm is cold hardy, suffering more from summer drought than winter cold (to zone 4), although 90% of the University of Minnesota elm trials specimens were lost during the exceptionally severe winter of 2002–2003.

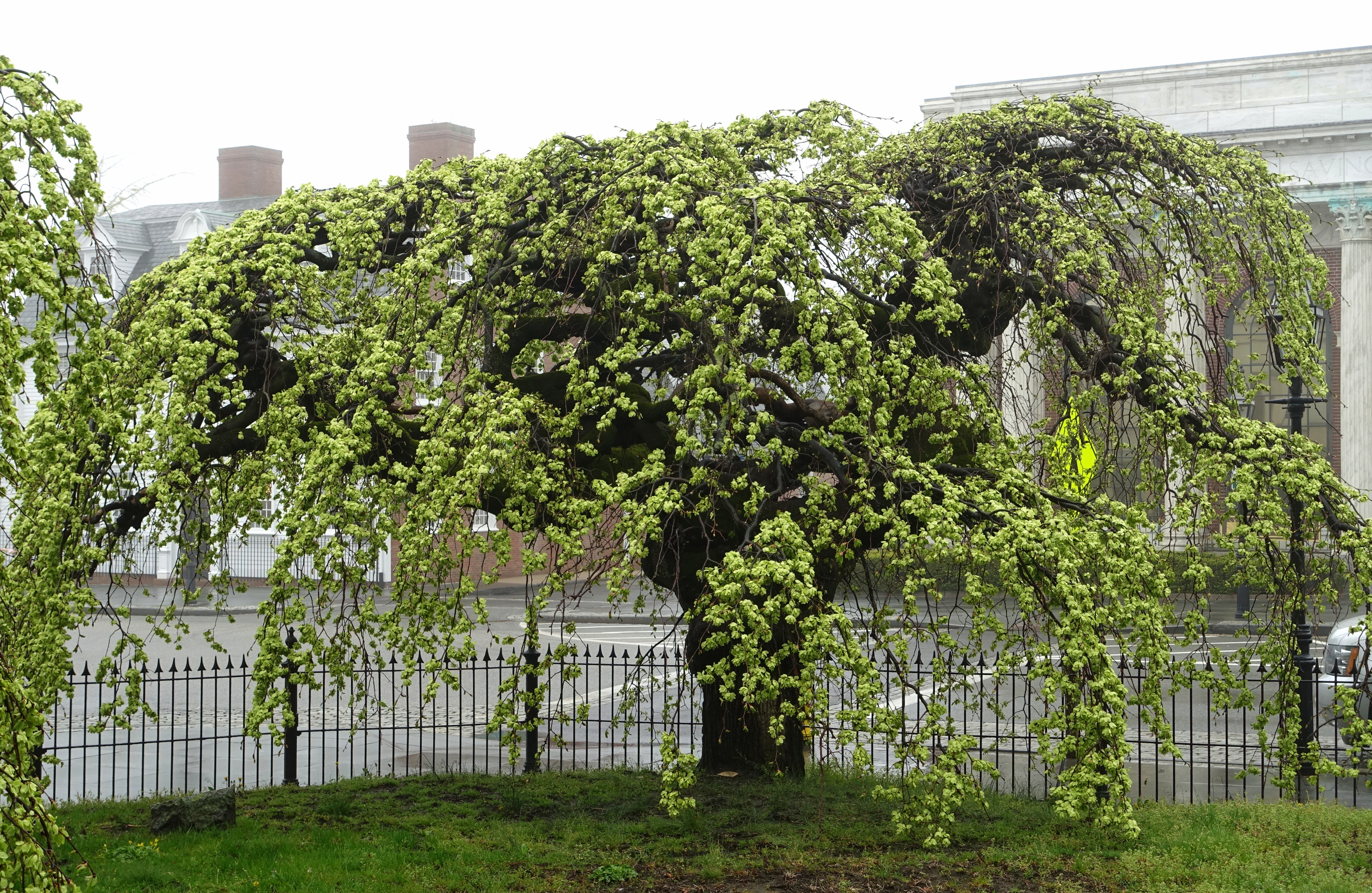
Camperdown fruiting, Eisenhower Park, Newport, Rhode Island

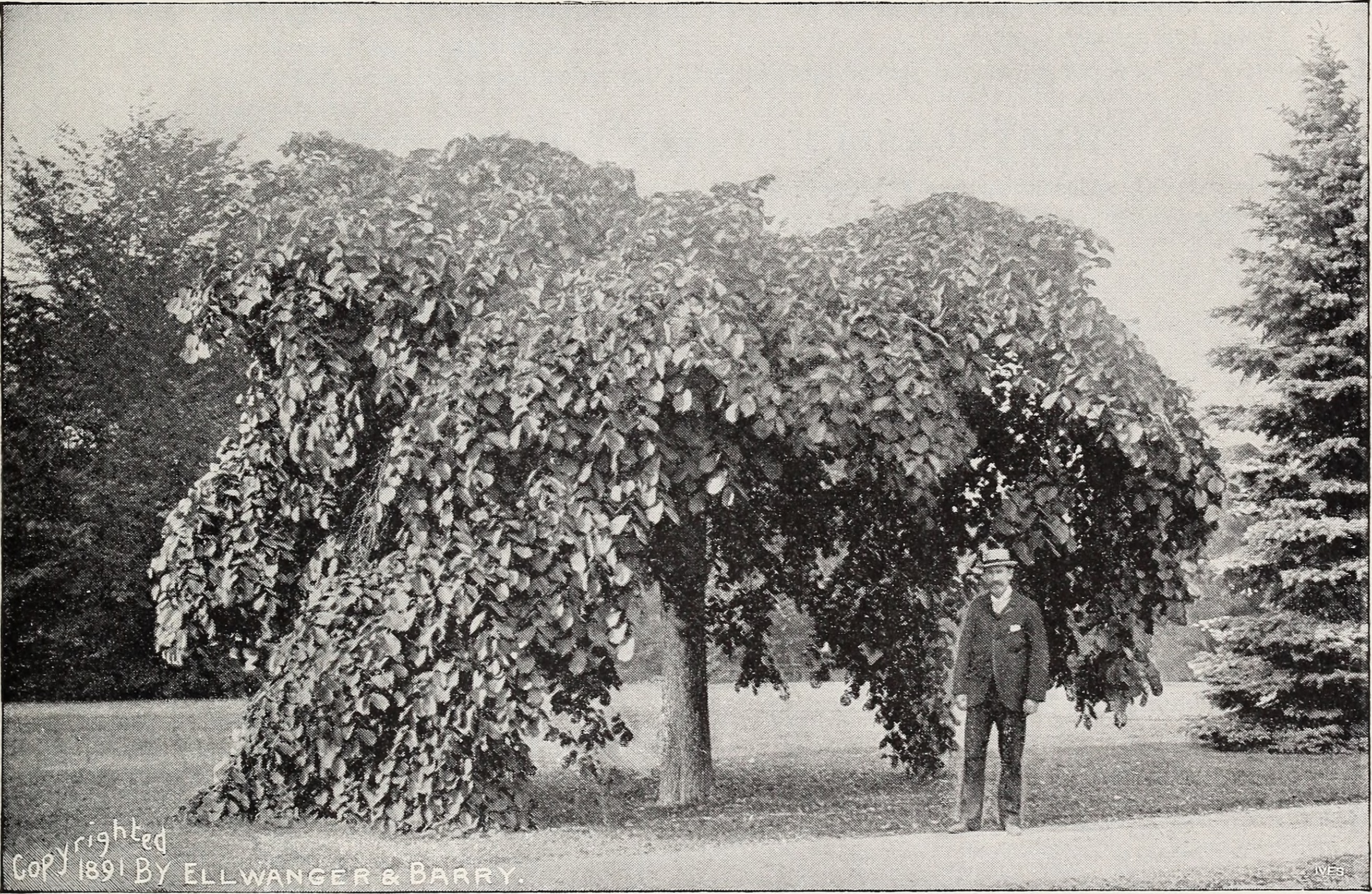
Camperdown Elm, 1891 (from Ellwanger and Barry's catalogue, New York)

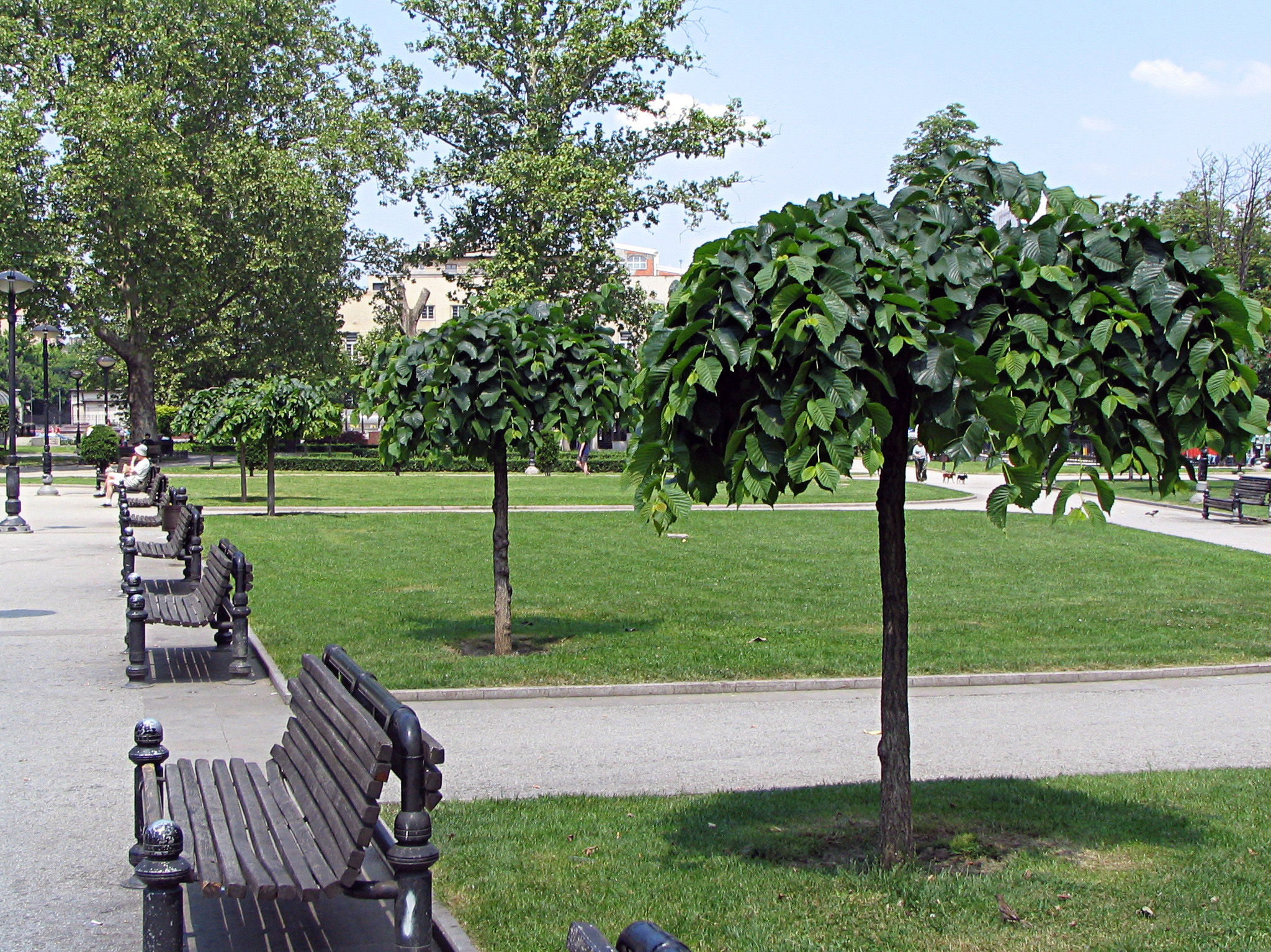
Young Camperdown elms grafted on Siberian elm stock, Saints Cyril and Methodius Park, Belgrade

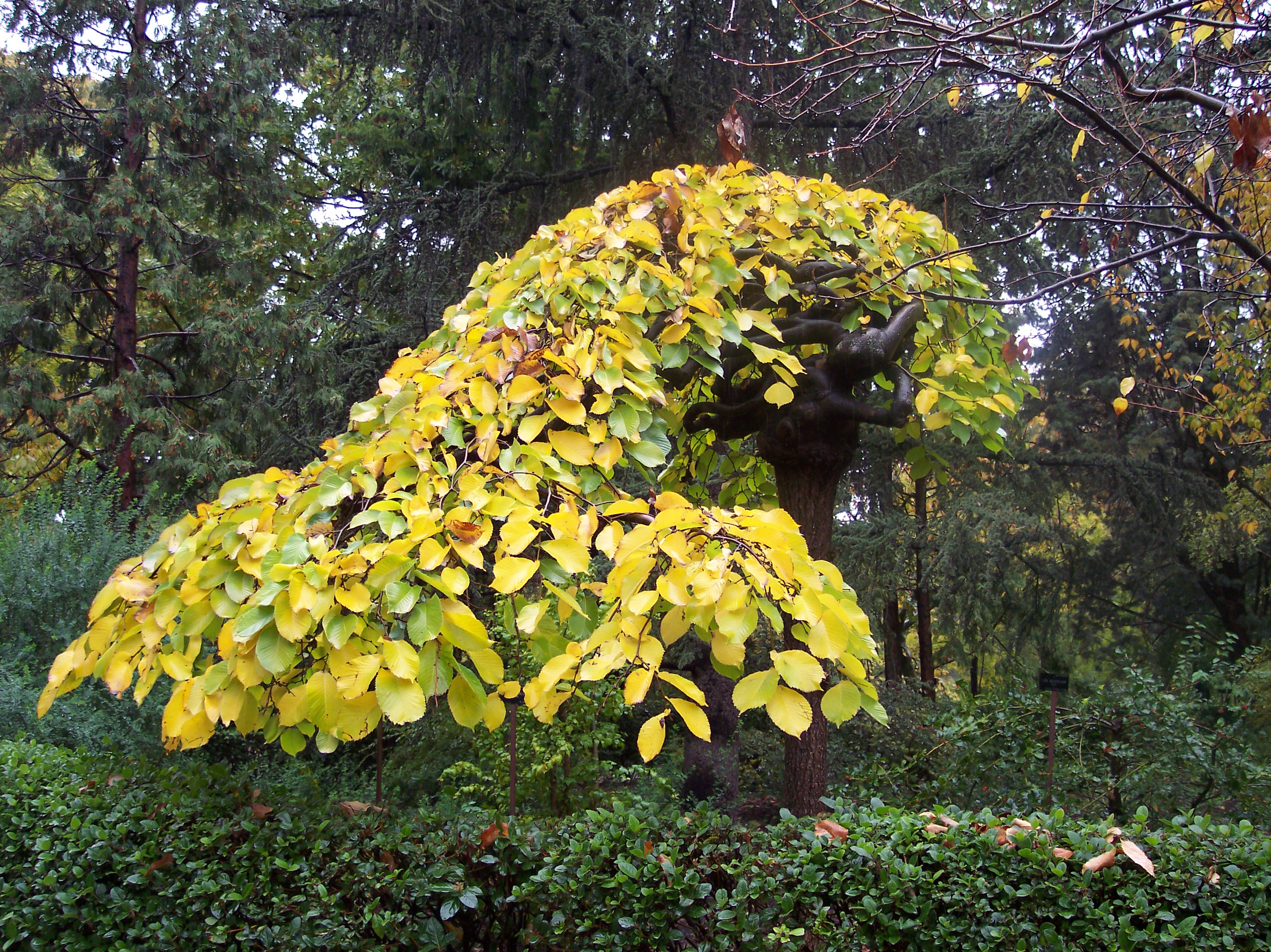
Camperdown in autumn, Royal Botanical Garden, Madrid

== Notable trees ==
In Dundee, Scotland, there are two well established Camperdownii Elms at the gated entrance to a private residence on Constitution Terrace in the Crescents Conservation Area. Both trees have grown so they intertwine with each other and create the illusion of one tree in the summer months. The trees are likely to have been cultivated around 1850, the same age as the Victorian mansion situated in the grounds which was built around 1850, therefore are among the oldest in Dundee. These trees are the only known 'twin trees' of their kind. Baxter Park claims the tallest Camperdown Elm.

In Prospect Park, Brooklyn, a Camperdown Elm planted in 1872 near the Boat House has developed into a picturesque weatherbeaten specimen, no more than four metres high, like an oversized bonsai. Described by the poet Marianne Moore as "our crowning curio," the Prospect Park tree is considered the outstanding specimen tree in the park. Halifax Public Gardens contains a similar specimen, located next to the Boer War Memorial fountain, which displays the same characteristics as the Prospect Park tree.

The UK TROBI Champion trees are in Scotland, at Baxters Park, Dundee, and at Ayr Cemetery. In France, two grow by the gate at corner of rue de Buzenval and rue de Lagney in the Square Sarah Bernhardt, Paris (20th Arrondissement). NB: Two Corkscrew Willows at the entrance near the corner of rue de Lagny & rue Mounet Sully look the same during winter.

In Gardner, Massachusetts, there is a Camperdown Elm on Parker Street in the front yard of a former store now currently a private residence, towering over the peak of the two-story building with a trunk circumference of over 9 feet. The tree has not been touched for decades and is infested with leaf miners and borers; there is also a significant amount of trunk rot and large missing limbs. As of late June 2010, a local resident, Nate Thibault, has taken action to create a restoration plan for the tree. The tree's age is undetermined but believed to have reached its maturity. [UPDATE: The new owner of this property has unfortunately failed to recognize the historical significance of this tree and had it completely removed!]

There is a Camperdown Elm on the Smith College campus which was planted as part of an arboretum by Frederick Law Olmsted at the turn of the 20th century.

The Post University campus in Waterbury, Connecticut, hosts a Camperdown Elm, which once served as the backdrop for the university's logo.

In Warrenton, Oregon there is a Camperdown Elm on the property of the DK Warren House. This is actually 2 trees that have intertwined together for a spectacular canopy. www.dkwarrenhouse.com, Circa. 1885

In Port Gamble, Washington there is a Camperdown Elm next to the historic Walker-Ames House. Planted in 1875, this individual measures 20 feet tall, with a 26-foot crown and 7-foot trunk circumference.

In Kingston, Washington there is a Camperdown Elm on an old homestead that is now the community center called The Village Green. It was planted in 1885, it measures 20 feet tall, with a 28-foot crown and 7 foot trunk circumference.

In Alfred, NY the “Umbrella Tree” is a beloved landmark on the Alfred University campus. Frequently it's a temporary home to students nestled in its branches or artwork hanging from its limbs. Found in front of the Powell Campus Center it was planted circa 1905. Originally it sat in front of Kenyon Memorial Hall, the first building on this site. It once had a “twin” located just a few yards away that was removed in 1974 due to ill health. A third one was once located next to the School of Theology building (The Gothic), currently the site of Herrick Memorial Library.

In Saint John, New Brunswick, there is a Camperdown Elm on Red Head Road on the front yard of a former farm, currently a private residence. The owner is currently trying to locate the tree's history; its age is undetermined.

In Leamington, Ontario, there is a mature Camperdown Elm on Seacliff Drive in the back yard of a garden center.

In Eastport, Maine, there is a Camperdown Elm at the corner of High Street and Shackford Street. The tree is on the corner near the original Anderson home built circa the 1850s. It is 3 feet in diameter at the widest part of its trunk. Eastport is the easternmost city in the United States.

In Spiers Old School Grounds near Beith, Scotland is a fine specimen dating from the late 1880s planted by the Earl of Eglinton's head gardener on behalf of the Spier's Trust (see photograph).

In Newport, Rhode Island, there is a Camperdown Elm at the Chinese Tea House in the Marble House estate, a historic mansion built by Mr. and Mrs. William Kissam Vanderbilt between 1888 and 1892, which is open to the public.

In Cazenovia, New York, there is a Camperdown Elm planted in the gardens of The Brewster Inn.

Two large trees are situated outside 315 Eureka Street, Ballarat, Victoria, Australia, (2014), planted c.1900. Measured in 2011, one (girth 2.7 m) was 13.7 m tall and 14.3 m broad, the other (girth 2.6 m) 13 m tall and 13 m broad.

The largest recorded specimens are located in New Zealand. The cultivar was popular with early settlers and there are several trees with girth measurements over 2.8 metres listed on the New Zealand Tree Register. The largest tree, situated at 8 Harakeke Street, Christchurch has a girth of 3.5 m, is 9.6 m high and has an average canopy spread of 11.4 m (2016).

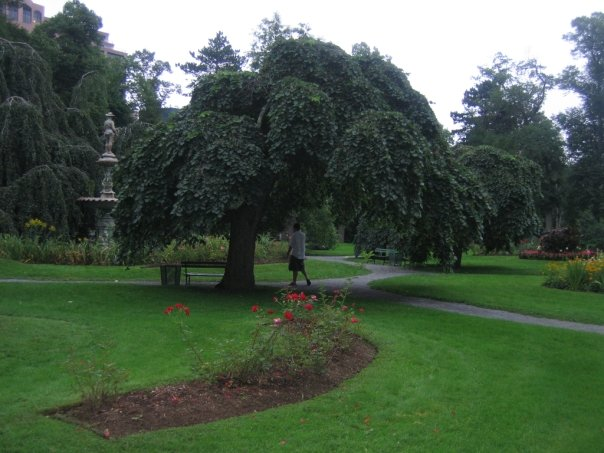
Weeping Elm, Halifax Public Gardens

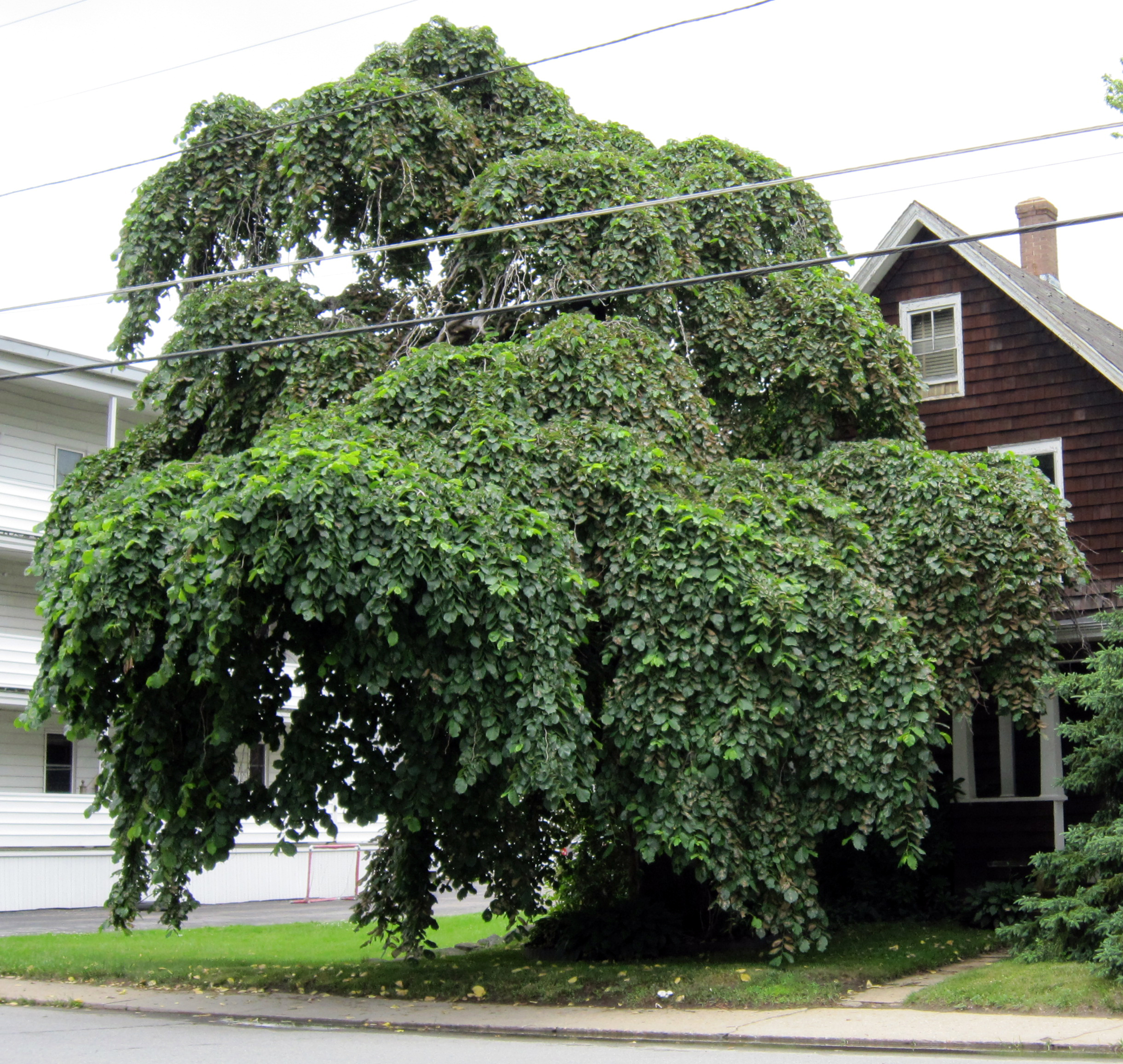
Unmaintained Camperdown Elm, Gardner MA 01440

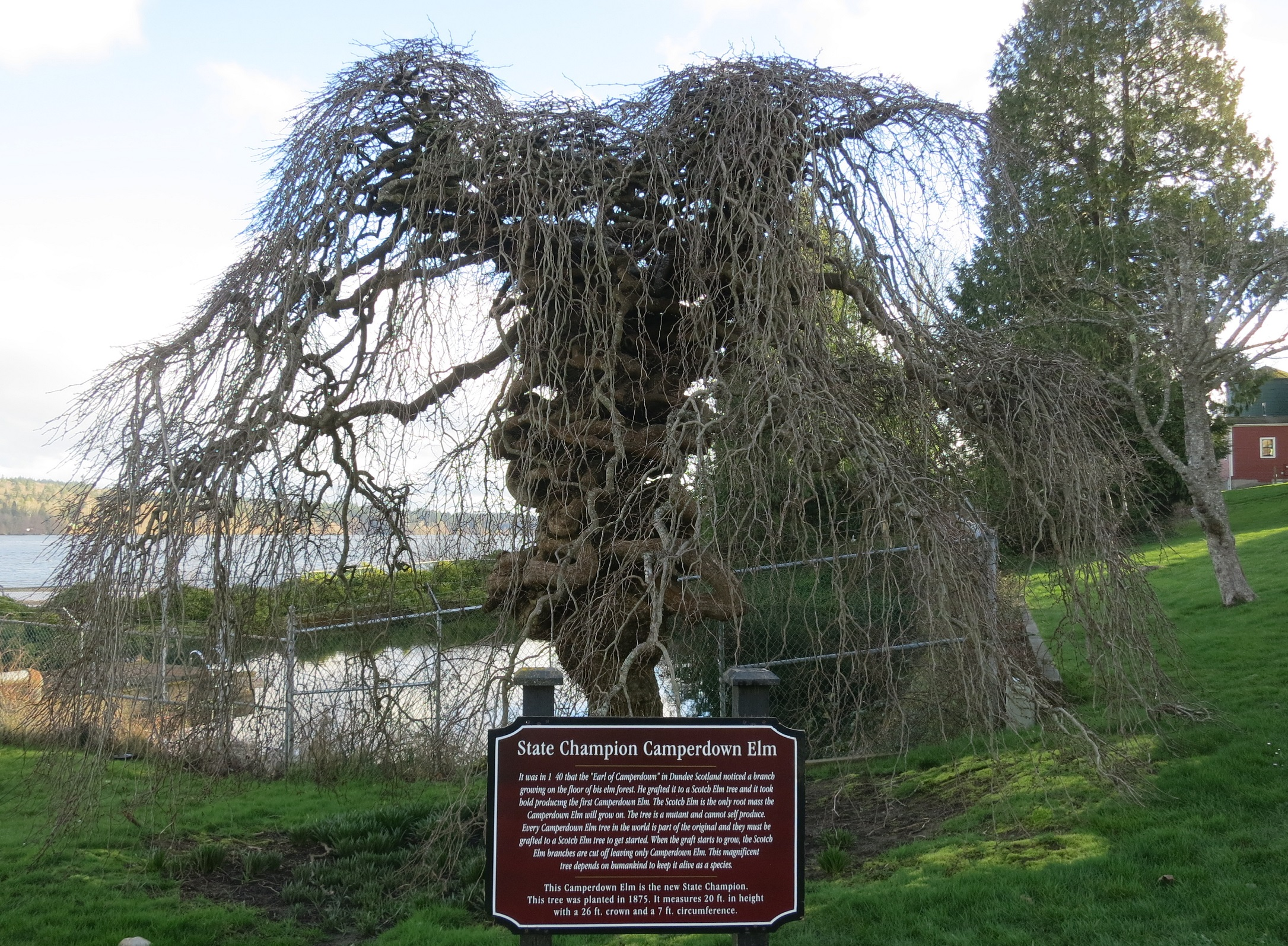
A Camperdown Elm located in Port Gamble, Washington. Planted 1875

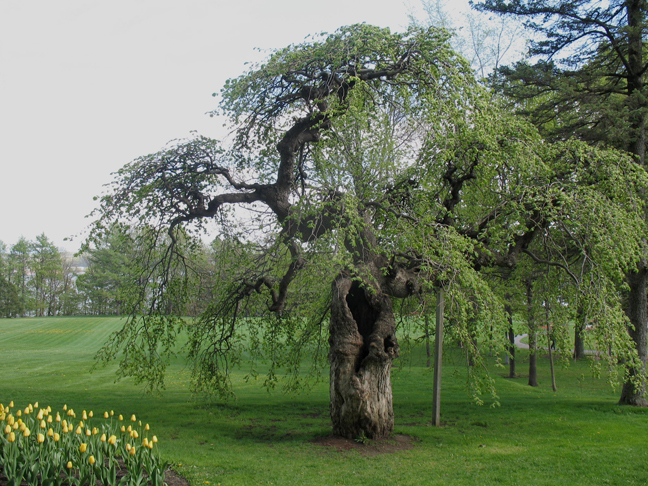
Parc du Bois-de-Coulonge, Quebec City

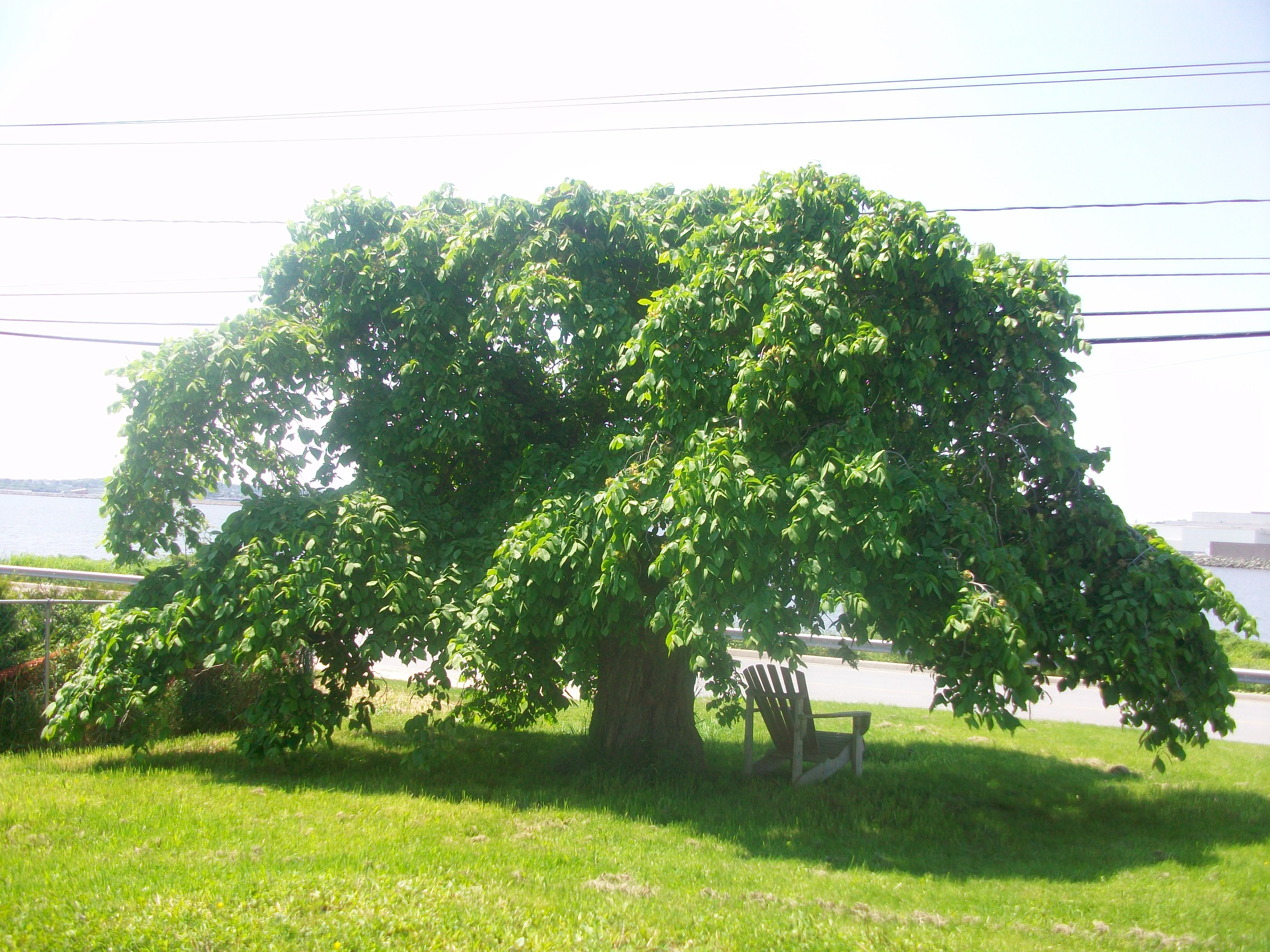
Red Head Road, Saint John, NB

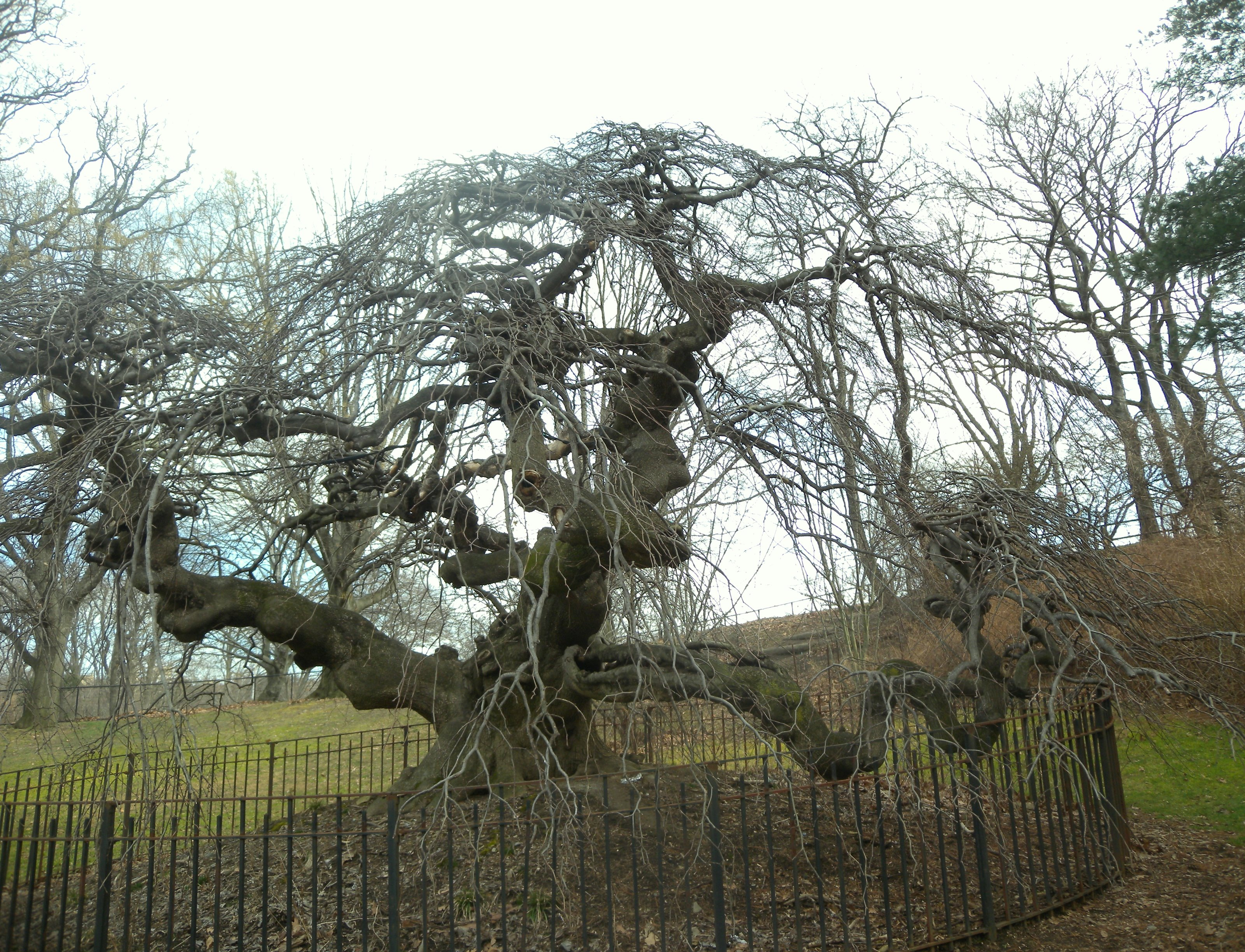
Prospect Park's elm in winter, showing its distinctive qualities

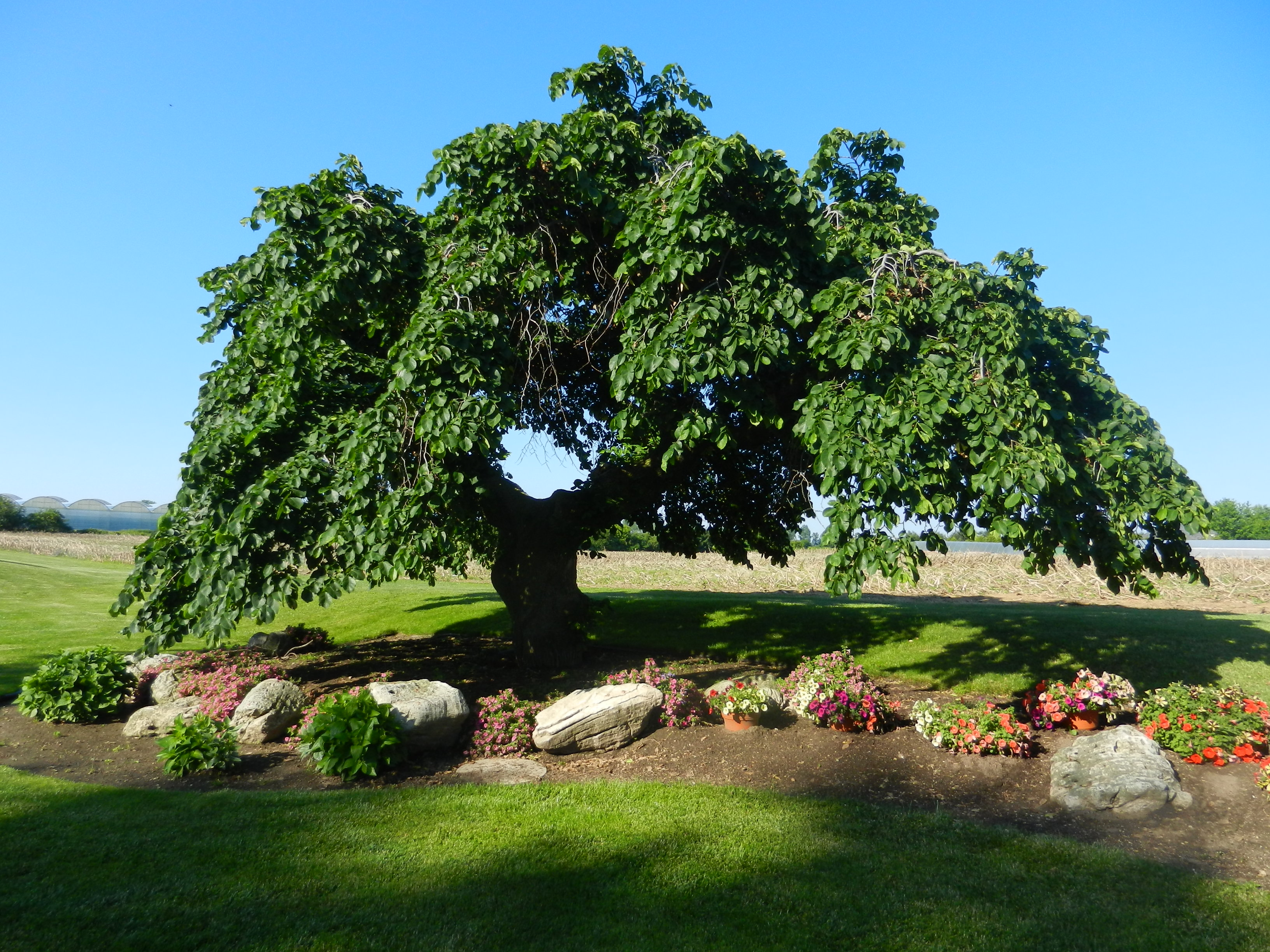
Camperdown Elm, Seacliff Drive, Leamington, Ontario, Canada

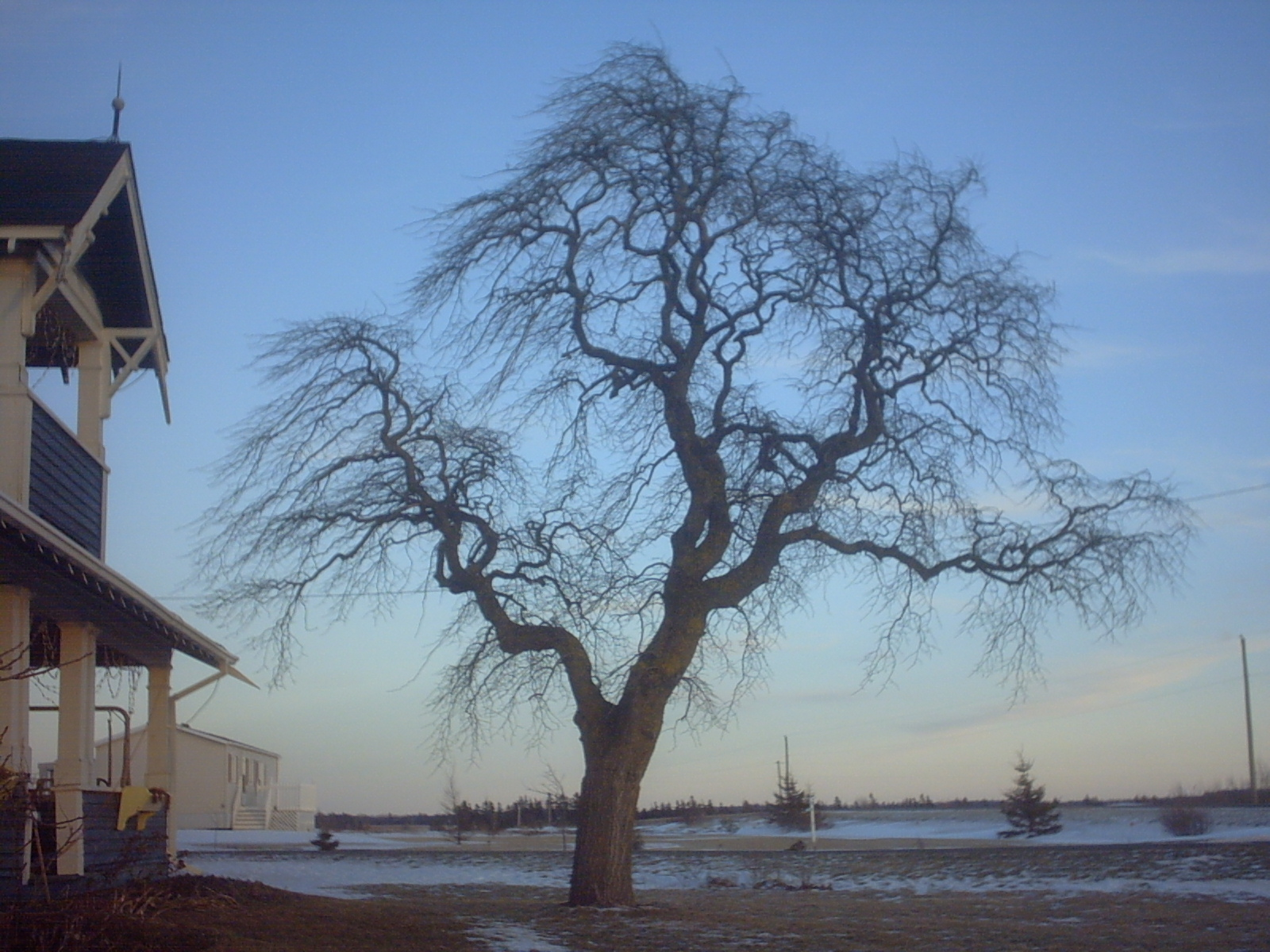
Open-branched Camperdown Elm, Prince Edward Island, Canada

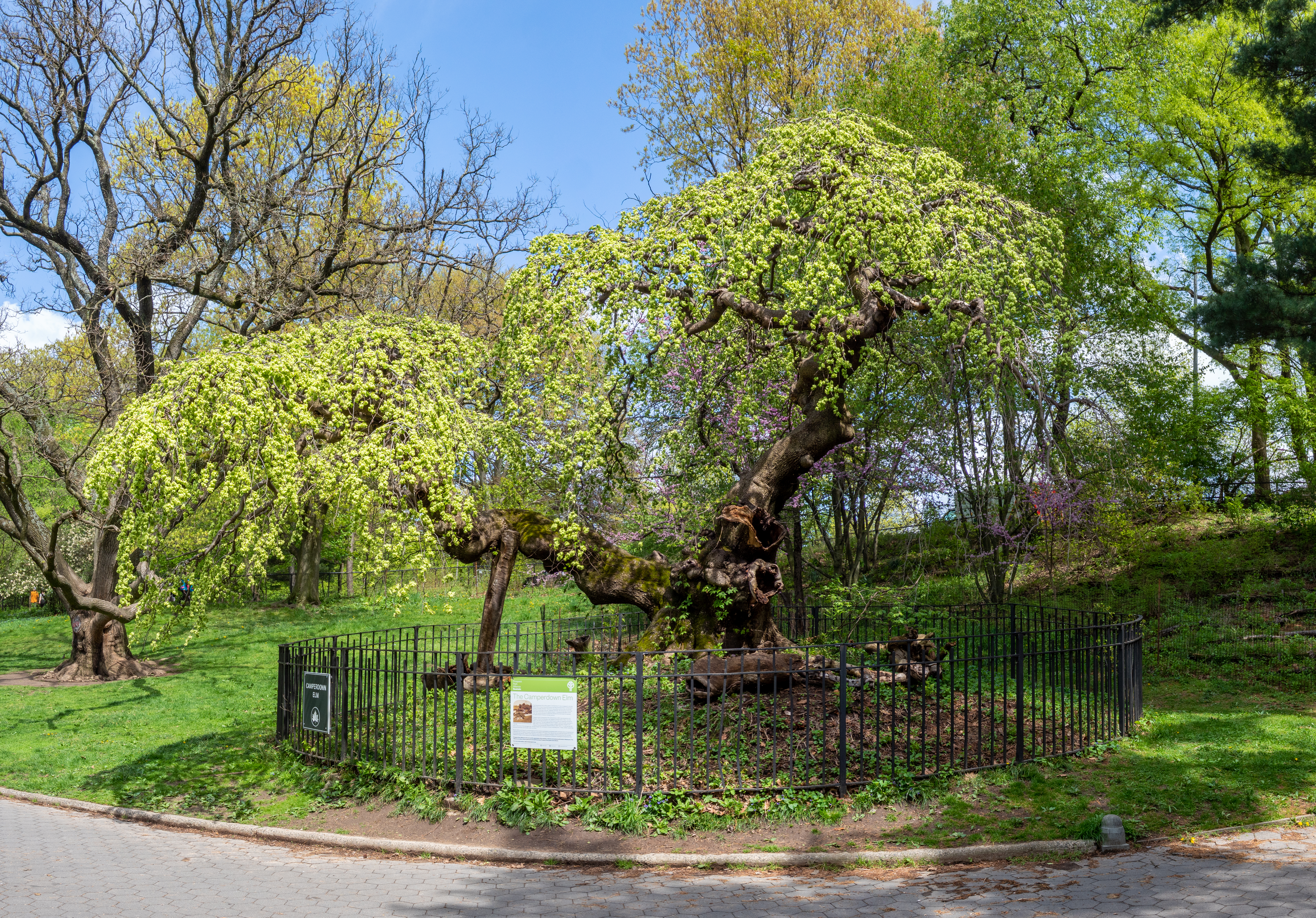
Camperdown Elm in Prospect Park, Brooklyn, US in early spring

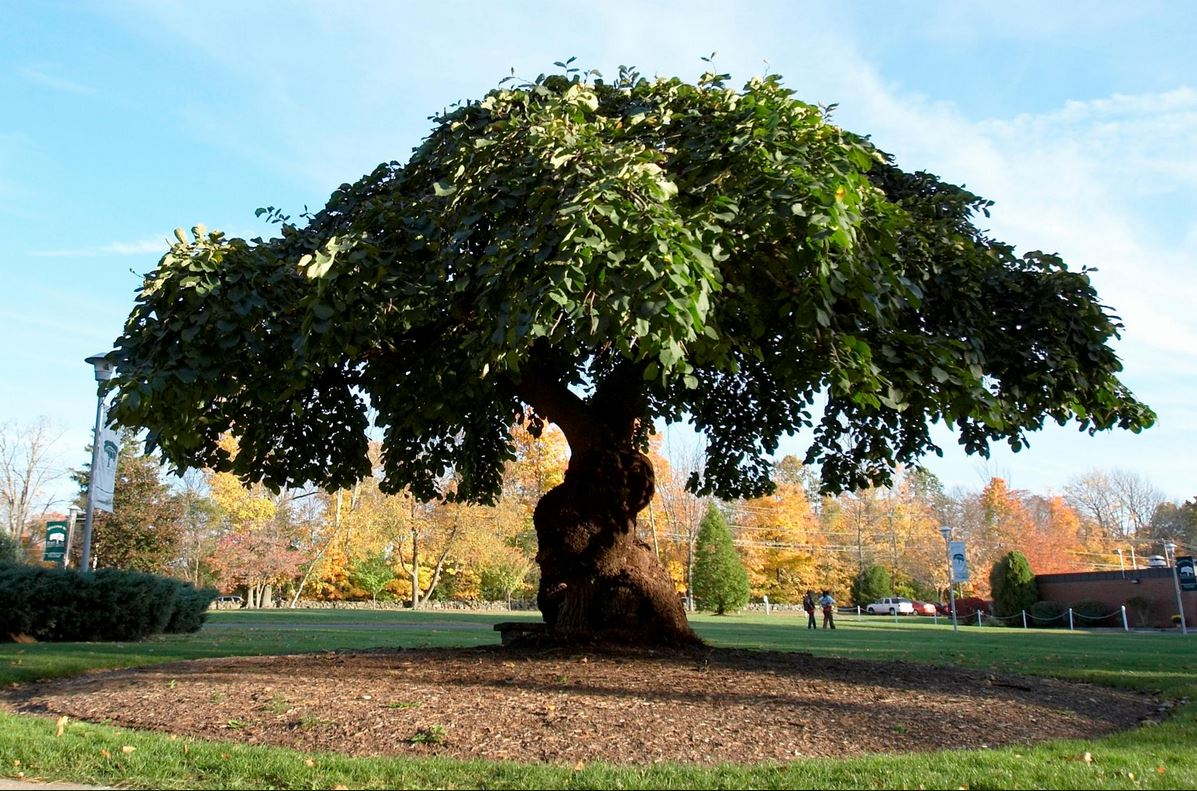
Camperdown Elm at Post University in Waterbury, Connecticut

== Synonymy ==
- Ulmus glabra 'Camperdownii'
- Ulmus montana (: glabra) var. pendula: Kirchner, in Petzold & Kirchner, Arboretum Muscaviense, 565, 1864.
- Ulmus montana (: glabra) var. pendula camperdownii Hort.: Henry, in Henry & Elwes, Trees of Great Britain & Ireland, 7: 1867, 1913.
- Ulmus montana (: glabra) pendula nova Hort.: Kirchner, in Petzold & Kirchner, Arboretum Muscaviense 565, 1864, name in synonymy.
- Ulmus scampstoniensis pendula: Petzold, in Petzold & Kirchner, Arboretum Muscaviense 565, 1864.

== Accessions ==
=== North America ===
- Arnold Arboretum, US. Acc. no. 352–51.
- Bartlett Tree Experts , US. Acc. nos. 1375, 2002–221.
- Brooklyn Botanic Garden , New York, US. Acc. no. 240001.
- Chicago Botanic Garden, Glencoe, Illinois, US. One tree, in the Parking Lots, listed as U. × vegeta 'Camperdownii'.
- Dominion Arboretum, Ottawa, Ontario, Canada. No acc. details available.
- Detroit Institute of Art, Detroit, Michigan, US. 2 Specimens frame the entranceway.
- Eisenhower Park, Newport, Rhode Island, US.
- Filoli Estate & Gardens, Woodside, California, US. No acc. details available.
- Gilman Park Arboretum, Pierce, Nebraska, US. No acc. details available.
- Grounds for Sculpture, Hamilton, New Jersey, US. One specimen in the Water Garden to the left of the sculpture "Relative"
- Hoyt Arboretum, Portland, Oregon, US. No acc. details available.
- Longwood Gardens, US. Acc. no. 2000–1338.
- New York Botanical Garden, US. Acc. no. 529/89.
- Scott Arboretum, US. Acc. no. 70–163
- Smith College, US. Acc. no. 3166PA.
- University of Idaho, Moscow, Idaho, US.
- Washington Park Arboretum, Seattle, US. No acc. details available.
- Port Gamble, Washington, US.
- Bloedel Reserve, Bainbridge Island, Washington, US. Two specimens facing the Salish Sea behind the main Residence.

=== Europe ===
- Arboretum de La Petite Loiterie , Monthodon, France. No details available
- Brighton & Hove, UK. National Elm Collection- Scattered throughout the city. Recent additions have occurred at Withdean and Preston Parks.
- Cambridge Botanic Garden , University of Cambridge, UK. No accession details available.
- Grange Farm Arboretum, Lincolnshire, UK. Acc. no. 512.
- Hortus Botanicus Nationalis, Salaspils, Latvia. Acc. no. 18099.
- Linnaean Gardens of Uppsala, Sweden. Acc. no. 1976–1049.
- Newby Hall and Gardens: near Ripon, North Yorkshire, UK. Two examples. No planting dates available.
- Tallinn Botanic Garden, Estonia. . No accession details available.
- Westonbirt Arboretum , Tetbury, Glos., UK. No planting date or acc. no. available.
- Wijdemeren City Council elm collection, Netherlands. 2 over 4 m high at cemeteries Rading, Loosdrecht and Hornhof, Nederhorst den Berg. Planted in 2015.
- Balintore, Highlands, Scotland. On private land, visible on google streetview. 57.760339, -3.900778

=== Australasia ===
- Eastwoodhill Arboretum , Gisborne, New Zealand. 3 trees, details not known.
- Morton House, Charles Street, Launceston, Australia. 1 tree.
- Orange Botanic Gardens, Orange, New South Wales, Australia, 1 tree.
- Glenrock Gardens, Tenterfield, New South Wales, Australia, 1 tree.

== Nurseries ==
=== North America ===
(Widely available)

=== Europe ===
(Widely available)
