= Ulmus × hollandica 'Serpentina' =

Elm cultivar

- Tree labelled Ulmus hollandica 'Serpentina', Denmark, 1965
- Hybrid parentage: U. glabra × U. minor
- Cultivar: 'Serpentina'

The putative hybrid cultivar Ulmus × hollandica 'Serpentina' is an elm of unknown provenance and doubtful status. Henry identified it as intermediate between U. glabra and U. minor, a view accepted by Bean and by Melville, who believed that the specimens at Kew bearing the name 'Serpentina' were U. glabra "introgressed by U. carpinifolia" [: U. minor] and were similar to but "distinct from 'Camperdownii'".

Koch had listed an U. serpentina in 1872, and an U. montana serpentina was marketed in the late 19th century by the Baudriller nursery of Angers, the Späth nursery of Berlin, and the Ulrich nursery of Warsaw. In Späth catalogues between c.1890 and 1920, however, though 'Serpentina' appears, 'Camperdownii' is absent; by 1930 'Camperdownii' appears but 'Serpentina' is absent. This suggests that 'Serpentina' may have been a continental name for 'Camperdownii', and that Späth dropped the name 'Serpentina' c.1930 in favour of 'Camperdownii'. Elwes and Henry's failure to mention the serpentining branches of 'Camperdownii' may have contributed to the impression of two different trees. In this omission they were followed by Bean (1925), Green (1964), Hillier (1972– 2002), Krüssmann(1976), and White (2003), the first four of whom, like Elwes and Henry, list 'Serpentina' as a cultivar distinct from 'Camperdownii'.

The ultimate form of 'Camperdownii' depends on such factors as latitude and location, on what part of the parent tree the cuttings come from, on the 'stock' on which it is grafted, and on possible continuing mutation. Specimens may therefore vary in form, which might account for Henry and Melville's "hybrid" 'Serpentina'.

Henry, quoting Koch, said that 'Serpentina' was sold in nurseries as the Parasol Elm, which was distinguished from Ulmus campestris pendula by having larger leaves. Both 'Serpentina' and the Scampston Elm were sometimes referred to as U. americana pendula. (Other European elms described as 'American' by various nurseries include 'Vegeta', 'Lutescens', and 'Nana'.)

== Description ==
Baudriller (1880) described Ulmus montana serpentina as "a curious variety which, top-grafted, forms by the entanglement of its vigorous branches a superb parasol", and Henry (1913) as "a small tree with curved and twisted pendulous branches, a dense pyramidal or globose crown, and leaves and branchlets similar to those of U. × hollandica 'Major' ". An U. serpentina was described in the journal Nature in 1918: "The branches are curiously contorted and reflexed, while all the shoots from one to three years old are pendulous rods, which, with the beautiful foliage, form an exterior covering reaching to the ground". Krüssman, who listed a 'Serpentina' under U. glabra, described it (1984) as a weeping elm with "twisted corkscrew-like branches" and leaves "like those of U. 'Camperdownii'". Like Henry, he makes no mention of contorted branching in his description of 'Camperdowni'.

== Pests and diseases ==
No cultivars labelled 'Serpentina' are known to have any resistance to Dutch elm disease.

== Cultivation ==
The journal Nature reported in July 1918 "a remarkable elm of the variety known as Ulmus serpentina, apparently about sixty years old, vigorously growing in a Croydon garden". "Sixty years old" would pre-date the first known reference to a 'Serpentina', but would tally with an early 'Camperdownii' planting. Späth's U. montana serpentina was planted at Kew in 1896. Henry, though he describes Kew's 'Serpentina', calling it "U. major var. serpentina Henry", makes, unusually, no mention of a Kew 'Camperdownii'. Späth's U. montana serpentina was planted in 1897 at the Dominion Arboretum, Ottawa, Canada, which, though it contained some eighty elm cultivars by the turn of the century, had no specimen labelled 'Camperdownii'. Three specimens supplied by the Späth nursery to the Royal Botanic Garden Edinburgh in 1902 as U. montana serpentina are now assumed by the Garden to have been 'Camperdownii', the Garden having no separate accession record for its 'Camperdownii', a sizeable tree by the 1970s (felled in the 1980s). A specimen of U. montana serpentina obtained from Späth before 1914, and planted in 1916, stood in the Ryston Hall arboretum, Norfolk, in the early 20th century. A 1920 photograph taken at Hortus Botanicus, Leiden, showing a weeping tree, is captioned Ulmus scabra [: U. glabra Huds.] Serpentina. Its identification by the arboretum as a wych cultivar points to Camperdown Elm.

A Camperdown Elm that stands (2016) in Jevington, Sussex, planted to commemorate the end of the First World War, is described in surviving notes from the time as a 'Serpentine Elm', brought back from Berlin in 1913 by Captain Loftus Henry Canton of the parish, and after the War planted in the churchyard. Its Berlin provenance suggests that it was Späth's U. montana serpentina.

Elms called 'Serpentina' still survive in Eastern Europe. A 'Serpentina' (Latvian: Parastā goba 'Serpantina') appears on a Latvian horticultural list. A Russian list contains separate entries for 'Camperdownii' and 'Serpentina'. The introduction of a 'Serpentina' to Australasia has not been recorded.

== Accessions ==
=== Europe ===
- Grange Farm Arboretum, Sutton St James, Spalding, Lincolnshire, UK. Acc. no. 1100.
- Hortus Botanicus Nationalis, Salaspils, Latvia. Acc. no. 18126 (as U. glabra 'Serpentina').
