= Coleophora ulmifoliella =

Scientific classification
- Kingdom: Animalia
- Phylum: Arthropoda
- Clade: Pancrustacea
- Class: Insecta
- Order: Lepidoptera
- Family: Coleophoridae
- Genus: Coleophora
- Species: C. ulmifoliella

Binomial name
- Coleophora ulmifoliella McDunnough, 1946

Species of moth

The elm casebearer moth (Coleophora ulmifoliella) is a moth of the family Coleophoridae. It is found in Canada, including Ontario.

The wingspan is about 13 mm.
