= Ulmus minor 'Propendens' =

Elm cultivar

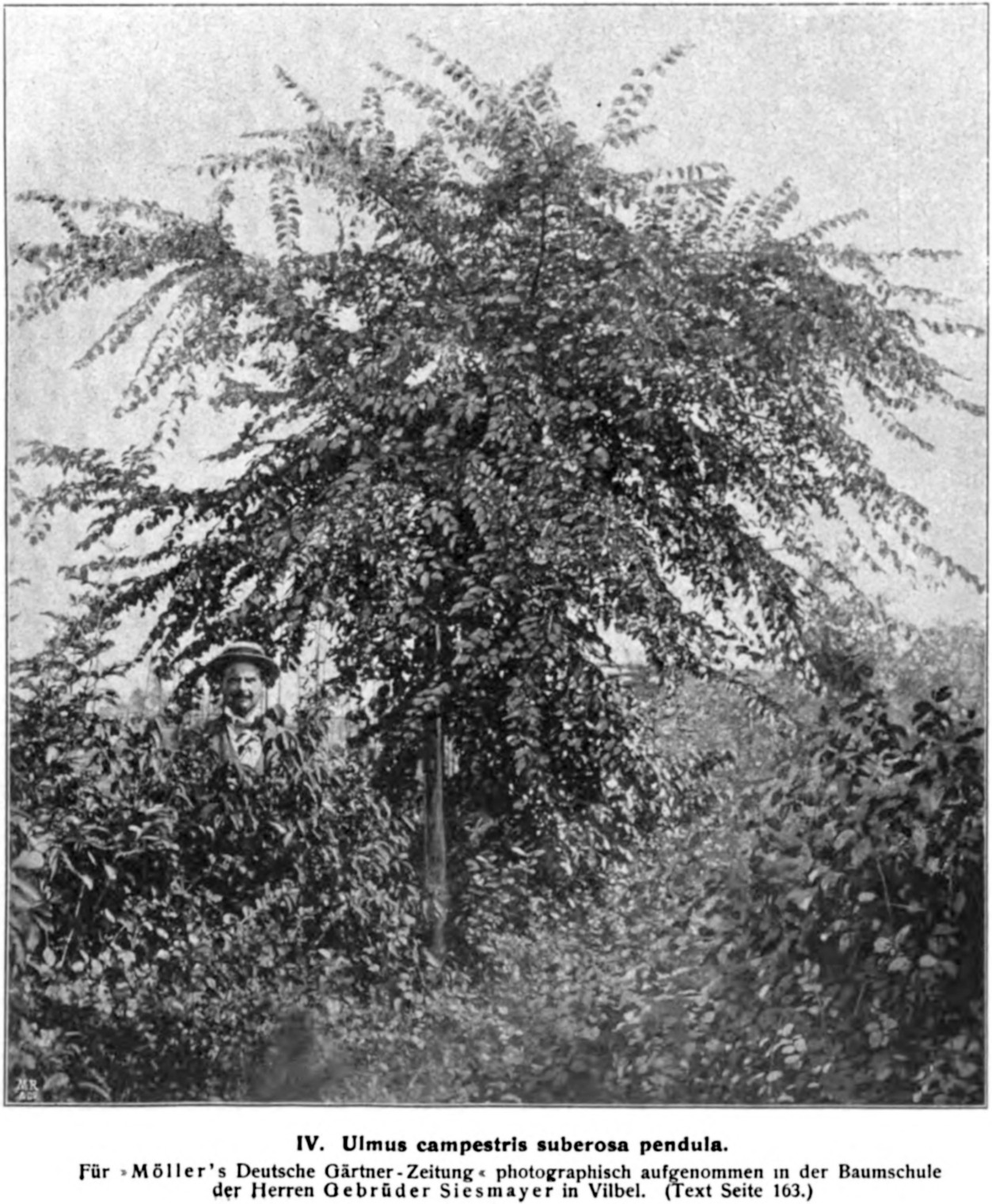
- 'Propendens' (described here by its synonym, Ulmus campestris suberosa pendula)
- Species: Ulmus minor
- Cultivar: 'Propendens'
- Origin: Europe

The Field Elm cultivar Ulmus minor 'Propendens', described by Schneider in 1904 as U. glabra (:minor) var. suberosa propendens, Weeping Cork-barked elm, was said by Krüssmann (1976) to be synonymous with the U. suberosa pendula listed by Lavallée without description in 1877. Earlier still, Loudon's Arboretum et Fruticetum Britannicum (Volume 7, 1854) had included an illustration of a pendulous "cork-barked field elm", U. campestris suberosa. An U. campestris suberosa pendula was in nurseries by the 1870s (see 'Cultivation').

Not to be confused with U. campestris (:U. minor) microphylla pendula, a smooth-twigged cultivar.

Green considered Kirchner's Ulmus rugosa pendula (1864) a synonym of 'Propendens'.

== Description ==
'Propendens' has branches wide-spreading, nodding, and corky; the leaves are small, 2 cm (0.79 in)–3 cm (1.2 in) long.

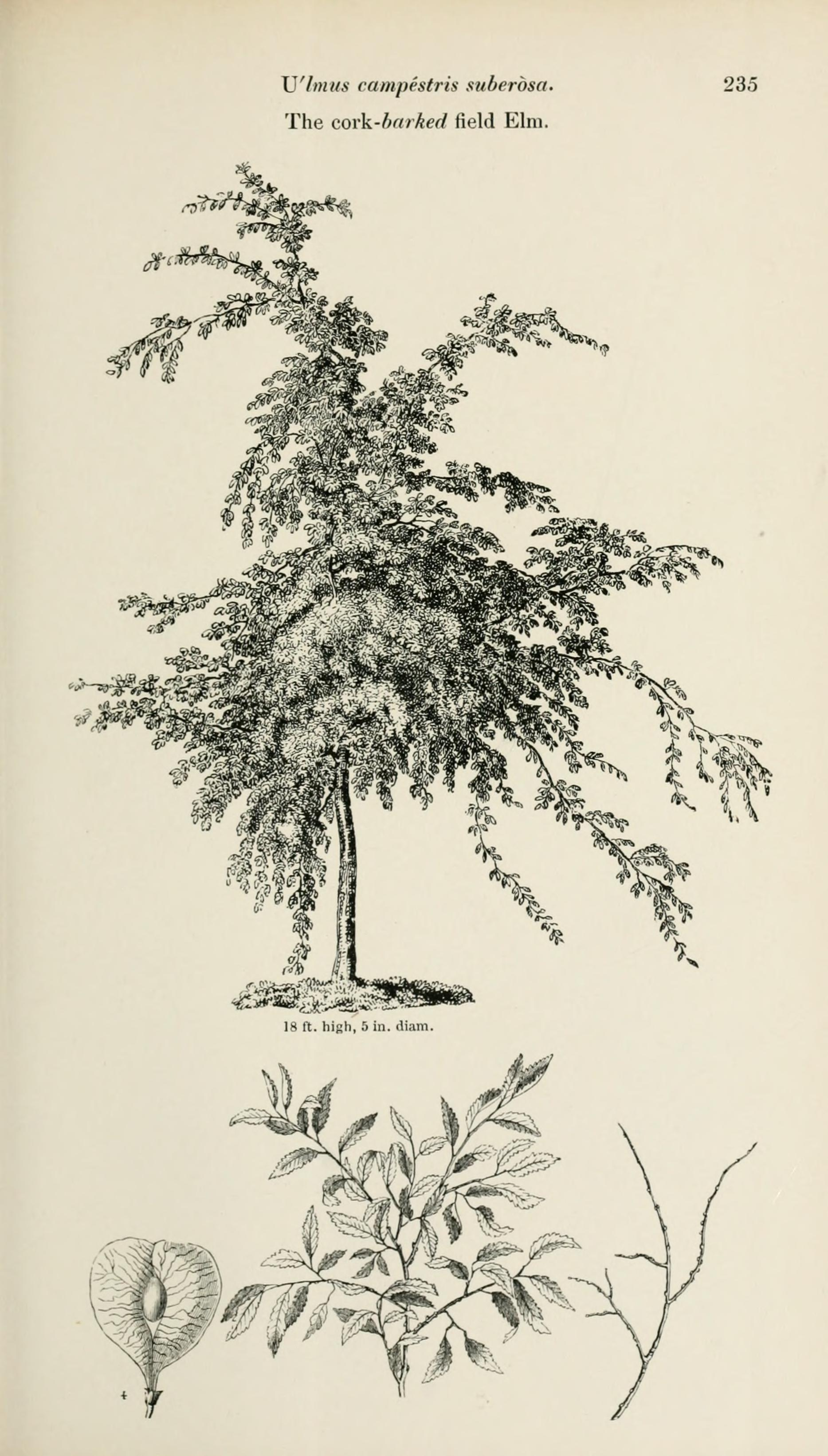
Pendulous "cork-barked field elm", U. campestris suberosa, from Arboretum et Fruticetum Britannicum (1854)

== Pests and diseases ==
Most U. minor cultivars are susceptible to Dutch elm disease, but, if not grafted, can survive through root-sucker regrowth.

== Cultivation ==
'Propendens' remains in cultivation in Belgium (see 'Nurseries'); no surviving mature specimens have been confirmed, although a putative specimen grows at the Botanic Garden of Eötvös Loránd University of Sciences, Budapest, Hungary. Provisionally identified as U. laevis 'Pendula', it has very corky-winged branchlets, atypical of the species.

From the 1870s, an U. campestris suberosa pendula was marketed in New York by the Mount Hope Nursery (also known as Ellwanger and Barry) of Rochester, New York, where it was distinguished from U. campestris microphylla pendula, and from the 1880s by the Späth nursery of Berlin and by Smith's of Worcester. Späth supplied an U. campestris suberosa pendula to the Dominion Arboretum, Ottawa, Canada in 1899, and three to the Royal Botanic Garden Edinburgh in 1902, which may survive in Edinburgh, as it was the practice of the Garden to distribute trees about the city (viz. the Wentworth Elm). The current list of Living Accessions held in the Garden per se does not list the plant. 1902 RBGE herbarium specimens, however, show smooth rather than corky twigs (see 'External links'). Kew's U. campestris var. microphylla pendula (1896 Hand List), with small leaves about an inch in length, was equated with 'Propendens' by Henry (1913), who called it "a form of Ulmus nitens var. suberosa", and by Rehder (1949); it was classed by Melville as a nothomorph of 'Sarniensis'. An U. suberosa pendula with "dark-green rough leaves" and "corky branches" appeared in the 1909 catalogue of the Bobbink and Atkins nursery, Rutherford, New Jersey, where it was distinguished from U. campestris microphylla pendula. A specimen obtained from Späth as U. suberosa pendula and planted in 1911 stood in the Ryston Hall arboretum, Norfolk, in the early 20th century. 'Propendens', distinguished from 'Microphylla Pendula', was present in The Hague in the 1930s. The tree is believed to have once been popular in eastern Europe. An U. campestris suberosa pendula, possibly 'Propendens', was present in nurseries in Victoria, Australia, in the late 19th century.

== Accessions ==
- Grange Farm Arboretum, Lincolnshire, UK. Acc. no. 1144.

== Nurseries ==
- Centrum voor Botanische Verrijking vzw, Kampenhout, Belgium.

== Synonymy ==
- Ulmus campestris var. microphylla pendula, Rehder.
- Ulmus campestris var. suberosa alata, Hort.: Kirchner, in Petzold & Kirchner, Arboretum Muscaviense 566, 1864.
- Ulmus campestris suberosa pendula Hort.: Späth, (Berlin, Germany), Catalogue 69, p. 9, 1887.
- Ulmus rugosa pendula Hort.: Kirchner, in Petzold & Kirchner, Arboretum Muscaviense 566, 1864, as name in synonymy.
- Ulmus suberosa pendula: Audibert, (Tonnelle, Tarascon, France), Catalogue 2, p. 53, 1831–32.
- U. carpinifolia 'Propendens': Krüssmann (1976)
