= Ulmus minor 'Pendula' =

Elm cultivar

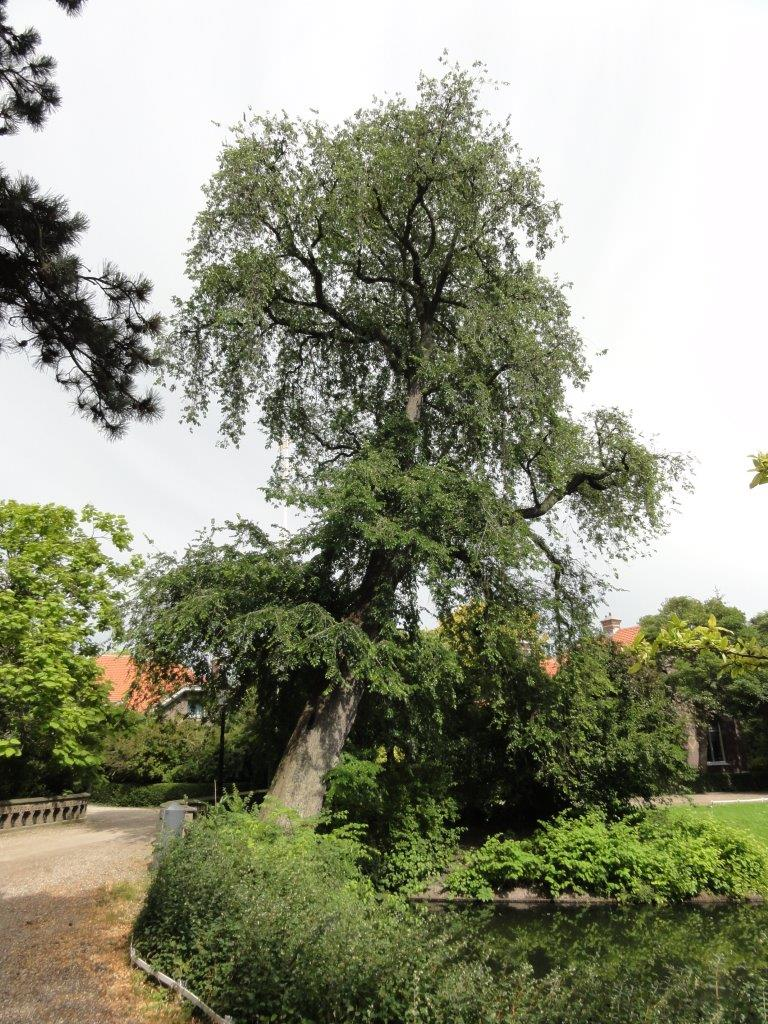
- Ulmus minor 'Pendula', Snouck van Loosenpark, Enkhuizen (2006)
- Species: Ulmus minor
- Cultivar: 'Pendula'
- Origin: Belgium

The Field Elm cultivar Ulmus minor 'Pendula' was said to have been raised in Belgium in 1863. It was listed as Ulmus sativa pendula by C. de Vos in 1887, and by Boom in 1959 as a cultivar.

Herbarium specimens confirm that more than one field elm clone has been distributed as 'Pendula'. Henry (1913) distinguished "the true var. pendula", with its "dense crown of foliage", from a cultivar Kew called U. glabra Mill. pendula nova, "a common form of [field elm] with drooping branches". The van Houtte nursery of Ghent distributed an U. campestris pendula from the 1880s, as did various English nurseries, while Späth's of Berlin marketed a small-leaved U. campestris suberosa pendula Hort. from the 1890s.

Krüssman (1984) equated U. minor 'Pendula' with an U. campestris wentworthii, confusing it with the hybrid Wentworth Weeping Elm.

== Description ==
The tree has slender pendulous branches, with leaves "smooth and glossy above and strongly glandular beneath, with orange-brown sessile glands". Bean described 'Pendula' as "very vigorous and large-leaved". Green reported that the young twigs are prone to dieback in hard winters.

Henry noted a peculiar feature on outer lower branches of the Kew and Cambridge Botanics specimens – "one or two small supernumerary leaflets at the base of leaves" – a feature of Cambridge and Maastricht herbarium specimens. "Other leaves," he added, "are large and broad, as if composed of two ordinary leaves" and "often cleft from apex to base".

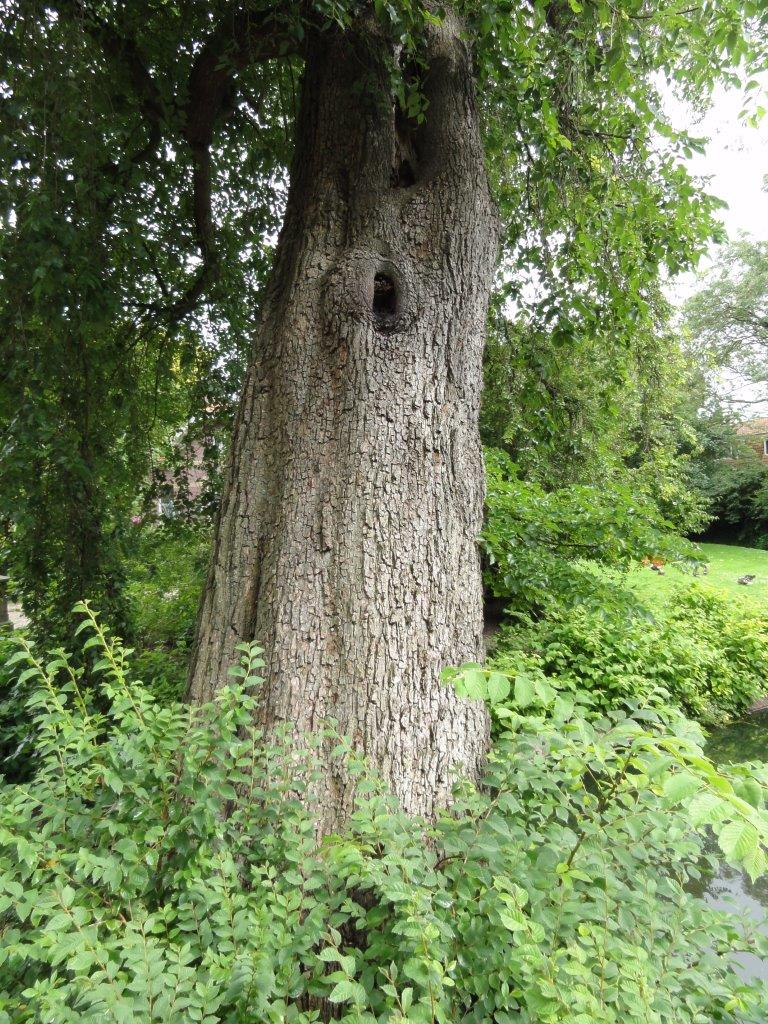
Bark of 'Pendula'

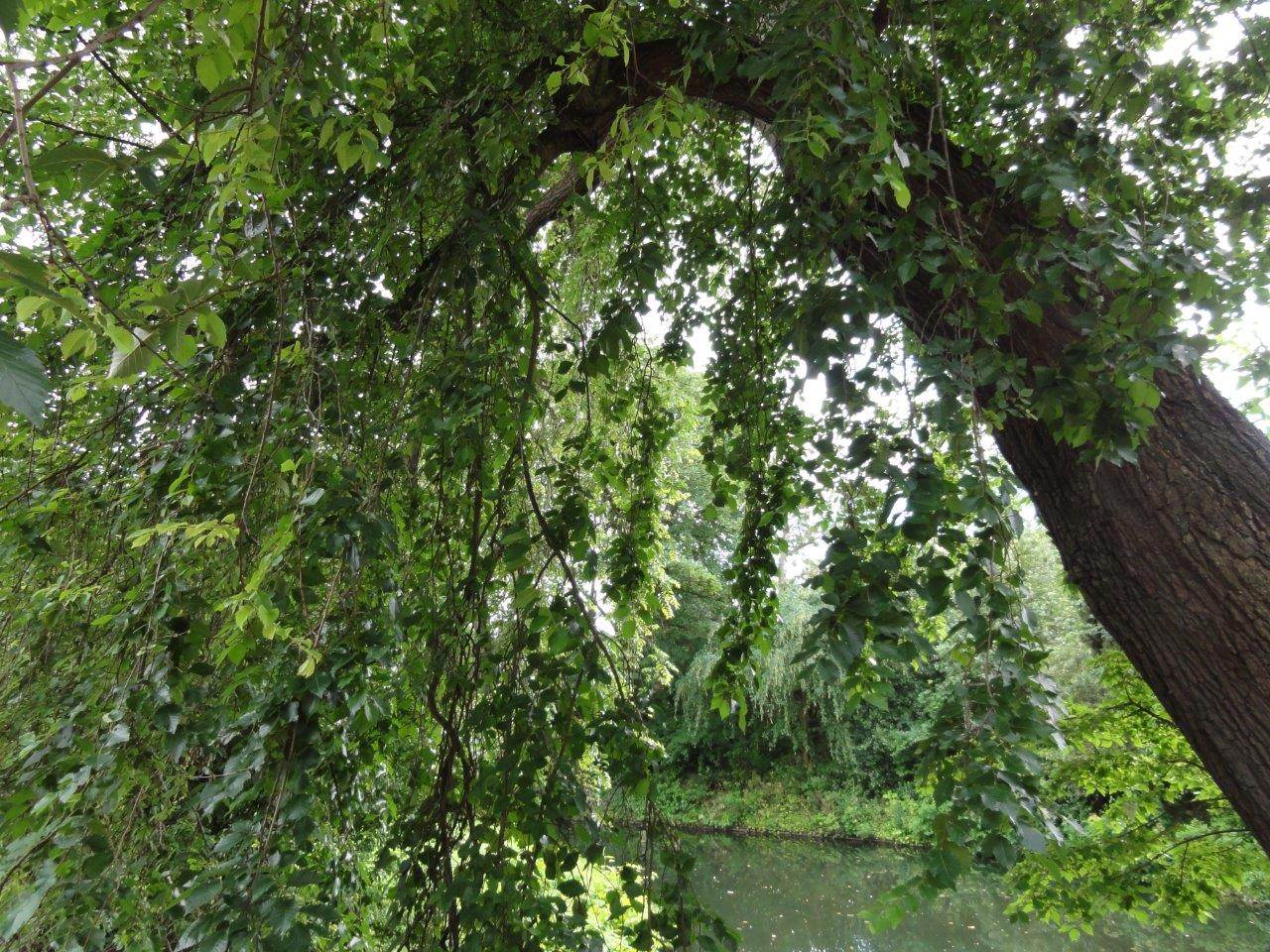
Foliage of 'Pendula'

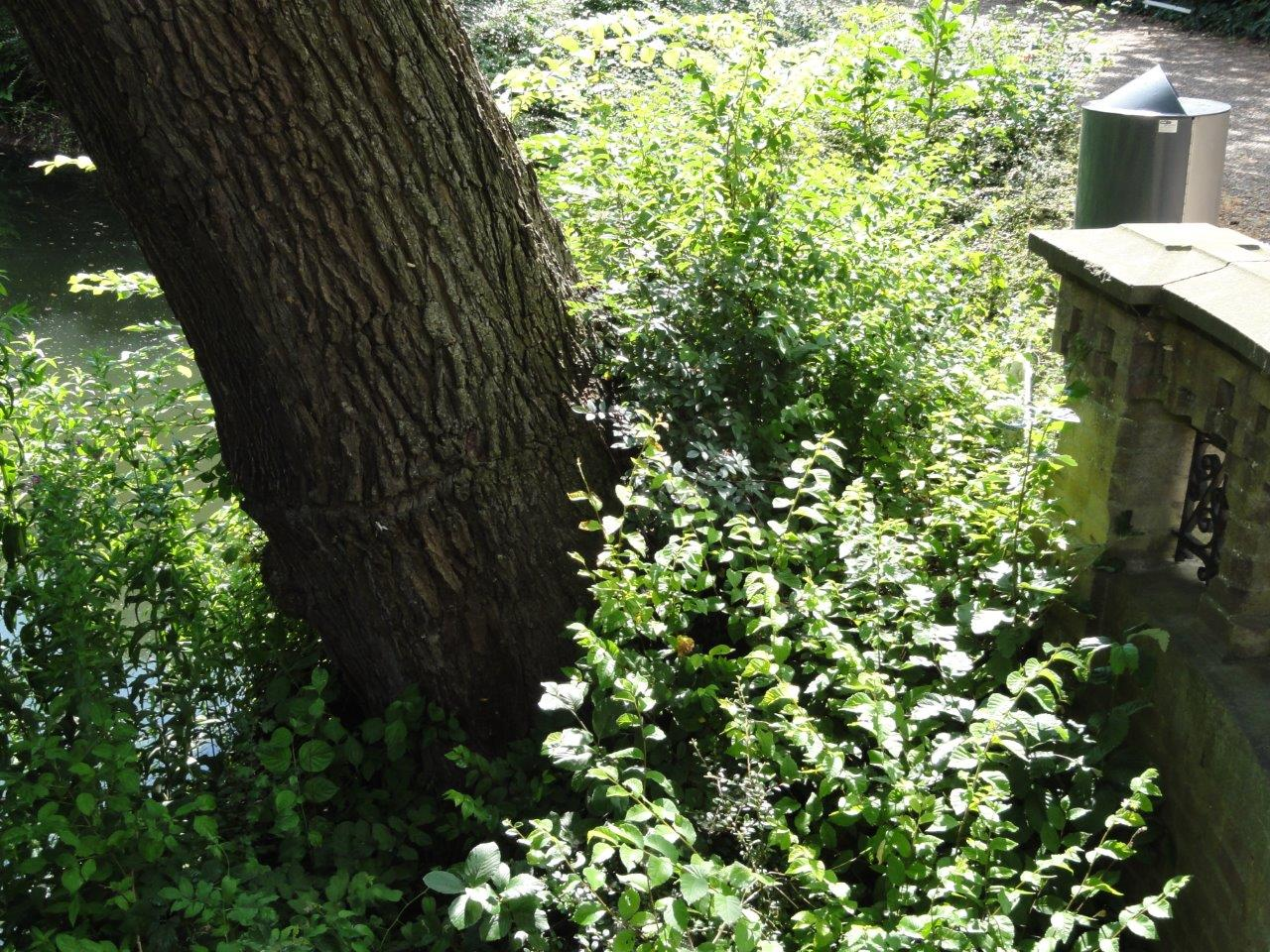
Suckers of 'Pendula'

== Pests and diseases ==
'Pendula' is susceptible to Dutch elm disease.

== Cultivation ==
'Pendula' was included in many European botanical collections in the late 19th and early 20th C. It is present in Australasia, its leaves matching old European herbarium specimens labelled U. campestris pendula. U. campestris pendula was introduced to North America, where it featured in the 1902 catalogue of the Bobbink and Atkins nursery, Rutherford, New Jersey, as 'Small-leaved English weeping elm'. The tree listed and illustrated in Bobbink and Atkins' 1909 catalogue as U. campestris microphylla pendula, 'English Weeping Elm' is not the European 'Microphylla Pendula', which has much smaller leaves, but was probably the same cultivar as the nursery's 1902 U. campestris pendula. An U. foliacea pendula was present in the New York Botanical Garden in the early 20th century. A 'Pendula', much trimmed, is present in Brighton, UK.

A notably pendulous small-leaved elm in the JC Raulston Arboretum, Raleigh, North Carolina (2019), labelled Ulmus minor subsp. minor 'Pendula', 'Weeping small-leaved elm', has U. pumila-type fruit and is indistinguishable in leaf and form from U. pumila 'Dwarf Weeper'. The arboretum acquired its specimen from Arborvillage Nursery, Holt, Missouri.

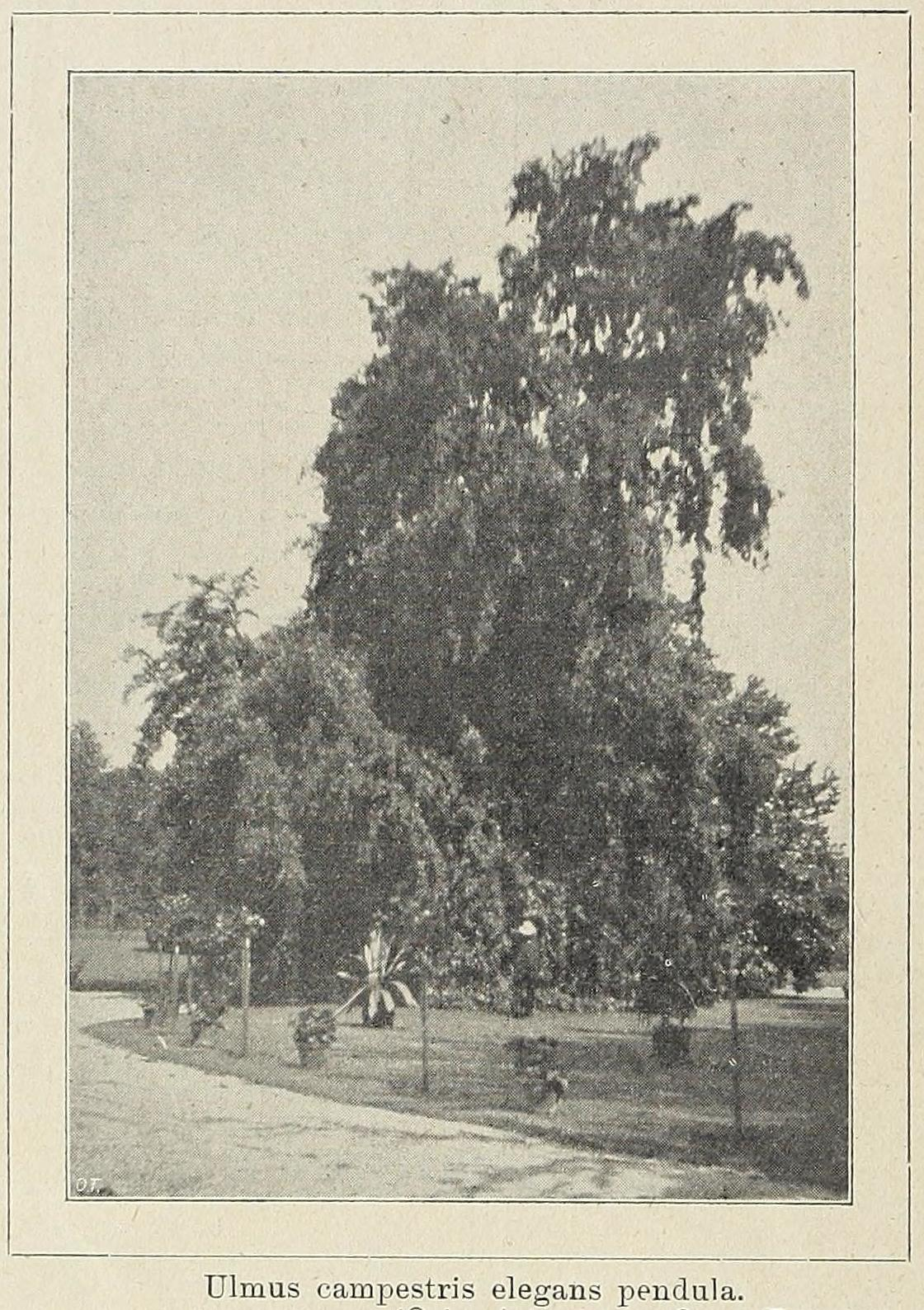
Ulmus campestris elegans pendula, The Netherlands, 1910

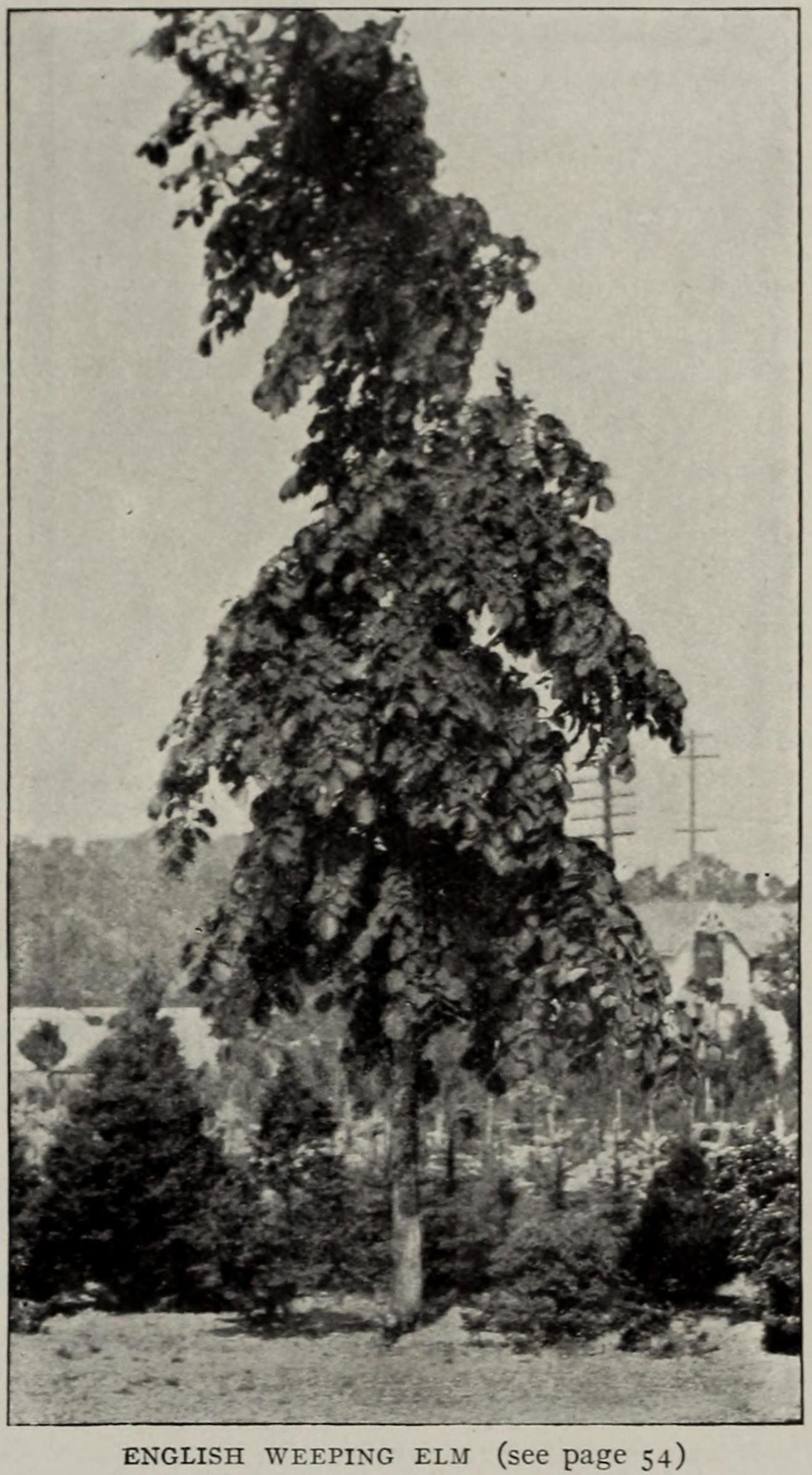
'English weeping elm' in Bobbink and Atkins' 1909 catalogue

== Notable trees ==
A tree in the Cambridge University Botanic Garden from the late 19th to mid 20th C, grafted high on English Elm stock and originally listed as U. nitens, was identified as 'Pendula' by Stearn in 1932. It survived the first DED epidemic, its crown removed after dieback in the late 1940s, and had attained a trunk diameter of 3 ft. by 1962, when it was confirmed as U. carpinifolia Gled. var. 'Pendula' by P. F. Yeo. A notable specimen, planted in 1898, stood in the Snouck van Loosenpark, Enkhuizen, the Netherlands, until it was blown down in 2015. A replacement, cloned from the original by nurseryman Ronnie Nijboer of the Noordplant nursery, Glimmen, was planted there in 2023. Eight old 'Pendula' line Mulwaree Street, Goulburn, New South Wales, Australia, their leaves matching the commonest 20th-century European 'Pendula' clone. The form of the sucker-trees growing around them confirms that the original trees were propagated vegetatively. An old semi-pendulous elm standing by the Bakery Hill roundabout, Ballarat (2025), propagated and marketed as a "significant elm" by the Mount William Nursery, may be a different clone from Goulburn's.

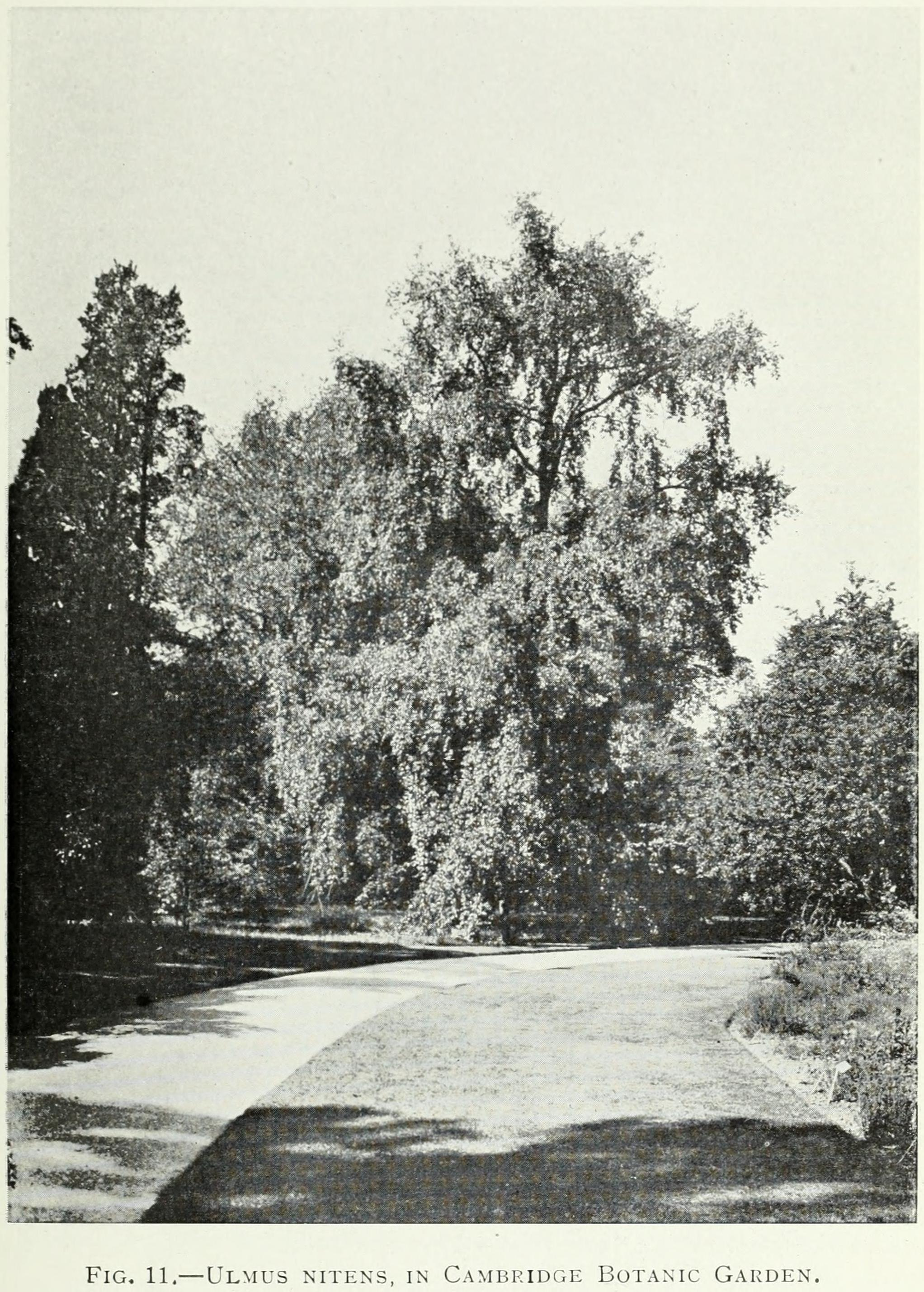
The Cambridge Botanic Garden 'Pendula', 1915

== Synonymy ==
- U. nitens var. pendula Rehder
- U. glabra Mill. pendula
- U. carpinifolia Gled. var. 'Pendula'

== Accessions ==
=== Europe ===
- Royal Botanic Gardens Kew, UK. Acc. no. 1973-11710 (as U. carpinifolia var. pendula).
- Grange Farm Arboretum, Lincolnshire, UK. Acc. no. 1136.

=== Australasia ===
- Eastwoodhill Arboretum , Gisborne, New Zealand, 4 trees, acc. details not known.

== Nurseries ==
=== Europe ===
- Arboretum Waasland, Nieuwkerken-Waas, Belgium. As U. carpinifolia 'Pendula'.
