= Ulmus minor 'Microphylla Pendula' =

Elm cultivar

- Species: Ulmus minor
- Cultivar: 'Microphylla Pendula'
- Origin: Europe

The Field Elm cultivar Ulmus minor 'Microphylla Pendula', the Weeping small-leaved elm, was first listed by the Travemünde nursery, Lübeck, and described by Kirchner in Petzold & Kirchner's Arboretum Muscaviense (1864), as Ulmus microphylla pendula Hort.. By the 1870s it was being marketed in nurseries in Europe and America as Ulmus campestris var. microphylla pendula.

Not to be confused with Schneider's suberose cultivar 'Propendens'. Kew's U. campestris var. microphylla pendula (1896 Hand List) was equated with 'Propendens' by Henry (1913), who called it "a form of Ulmus nitens var. suberosa", and by Rehder (1949), and was classed by Melville as a nothomorph of 'Sarniensis'.

== Description ==
Kirchner described 'Microphylla Pendula' as an elm of graceful habit with nettle-like foliage similar to but distinct from U. antarctica, the leaves being smaller and a lighter green, with pale smooth twigs and long pendulous branchlets.

== Pests and diseases ==
Most field elm clones are susceptible to Dutch elm disease.

== Cultivation ==
One specimen survives at the RBG Wakehurst Place, England, where it is cultivated as a hedging plant to keep it free from the attentions of the Scolytus beetles which act as vectors of Dutch elm disease.

'Microphylla Pendula', distinguished from 'Propendens', was present in The Hague in the 1930s. In the US, an Ulmus microphylla pendula, 'Weeping Small-leaved Elm', was marketed by the Mount Hope Nursery (also known as Ellwanger and Barry) of Rochester, New York, and by Frederick W. Kelsey of New York, while an U. campestris microphylla pendula was supplied by the Bobbink and Atkins nursery, Rutherford, New Jersey, and the Perry Nursery Co. of Rochester, N.Y. Two of these nurseries also stocked 'Propendens'.

== Synonymy ==
- Ulmus campestris var. gracilis monstrosa: Lavallée , Arboretum Segrezianum235, 1877.
- Ulmus carpinifolia 'Microphylla Pendula': Royal Botanic Garden Wakehurst Place.

== Accessions ==
=== Europe ===
- Grange Farm Arboretum, Lincolnshire, UK. Acc. no. 1135.
- Royal Botanic Garden Wakehurst Place, UK. Acc. no. 1973-21052 (listed as U. carpinifolia 'Microphylla Pendula')

== Nurseries ==
None known.
