= Rochester City School No. 24 =

- Rochester City School #24
- U.S. National Register of Historic Places
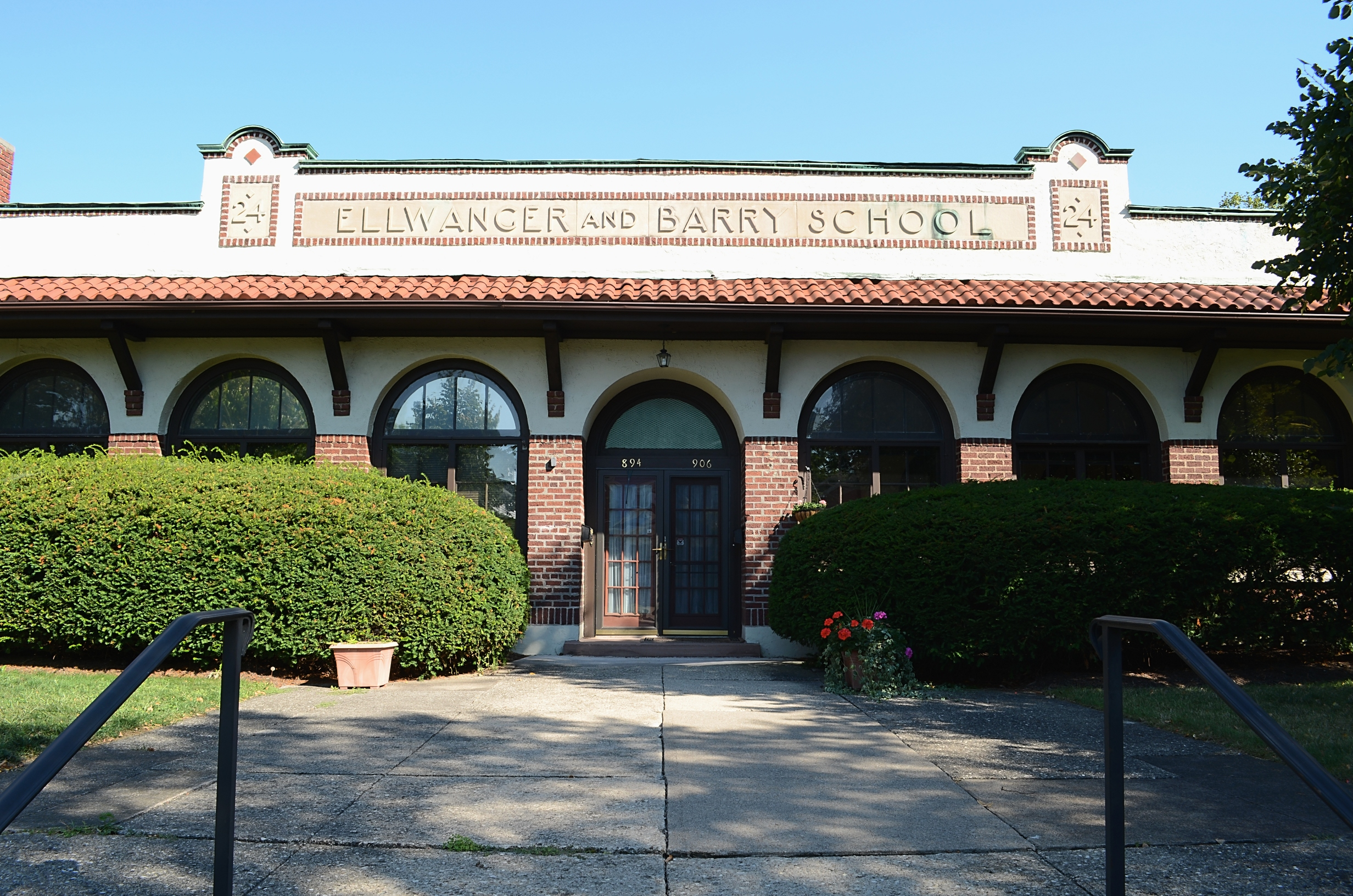

- Location within New York Location within the United States
- Location: Meigs St., Rochester, New York
- Coordinates: 43°8′10″N 77°36′5″W
- Area: 1.8 acres (0.73 ha)
- Built: 1913
- Architect: Gordon, Edwin S.
- Architectural style: Mission/Spanish Revival
- NRHP reference No.: 83001709
- Added to NRHP: September 15, 1983

Rochester City School No. 24, also known as School #24 and Ellwanger and Barry School, is a historic school building located at Rochester in Monroe County, New York. It was constructed in 1913 and is a one-story, Spanish Colonial Revival style building. The walls are constructed of hollow tile sheathed with brick and plaster and the hipped roof is covered in red Spanish tile.

It was listed on the National Register of Historic Places in 1983.

The building replaced an earlier structure, which sat across the Meigs Street – Linden Street intersection from the current building, on land donated by local nurserymen George Ellwanger and Patrick Barry. The original Ellwanger and Barry School was built in 1877 and expanded in 1888 and 1890, but it was replaced by the new school building in 1913.

The new school building boasted a number of modern amenities, along with a diverse set of curricular and extra-curricular activities. In particular, the building focused on student safety, becoming one of the first schools in the country to design each classroom with an external entrance. This inspired its early nickname, "The Safety First School", and inspired planners from across the country to incorporate similar design principles.

The school's enrollment declined in the 1970s from a peak of more than 600 students. The 1978–79 school year was the building's last as a school, and in 1980 the building (making use of the many external doors) was converted to condominiums.

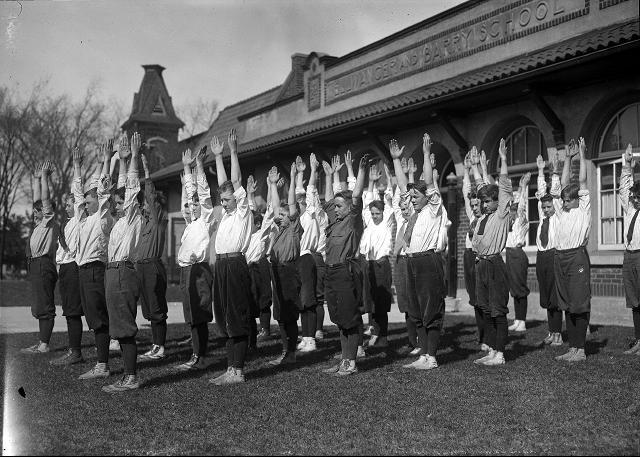
Students exercise outside the school in 1921.
