= Ulmus 'Rugosa' =

Elm cultivar

- Genus: Ulmus
- Cultivar: 'Rugosa'
- Origin: France

The elm cultivar Ulmus 'Rugosa' [:'wrinkled', the leaves], was first listed in Audibert's Tonelle (1817), as "U. campestris Linn. 'Rugosa' = orme d'Avignon [Avignon elm] (new species)", but without description. A description followed in the Revue horticole, 1829. Green (1964) identified this cultivar with one listed by Hartwig and Rümpler in Illustrirtes Gehölzbuch (1875) as Ulmus montana var. rugosa Hort.. A cultivar of the same name appeared in Loddiges' catalogue of 1836 and was identified by Loudon in Arboretum et Fruticetum Britannicum (1838) as Ulmus montana var. rugosa Masters, Masters naming the tree maple-bark elm. Ulmus montana was used at the time both for wych cultivars and for some cultivars of the Ulmus × hollandica group.

Not to be confused with Späth's U. campestris rugosa, a suberose field elm.

== Description ==
Revue Horticole (1829) described "l'orme d'Avignon" as a tall tree with downy buds producing large wrinkled leaves, elliptical in shape and tapering at both ends, with deeply double-toothed margins. Loudon described his Ulmus montana var. rugosa as having "dark, reddish-brown bark, cracking into short regular pieces, very like Acer campestre; a tree of spreading growth and moderate size".

Hanham's Manual for Royal Victoria Park, Bath (1857) described the U. montana rugosa in that collection as "a spreading and moderate-sized tree, with rather irregular and contorted branches", its wrinkled leaves being "much smaller and rougher than the species and a deeper green".

Koch (1872) described Loddiges' Ulmus montana rugosa, "now cultivated under this name in the gardens and nurseries", as an elm "with elongated, thickish, deep-toothed leaves and with soft-haired young twigs". Though he had not seen its samarae, he was confident that it was "a very different elm" from the field elm 'Rugosa' cultivar. Noting similarities between Ulmus montana rugosa and Ulmus crispa Willdenow, he conjectured that Ulmus montana rugosa, which has "similar but less frizzy leaves", may have arisen from Ulmus crispa. The 'Rugosa' of Hartwig and Rümpler was described as having somewhat folded leaves, and being pyramidal, thick and bushy.

== Pests and diseases ==
Not known.

== Cultivation ==
Loudon considered a tree labelled U. montana rugosa in the London Horticultural Society's Garden, with upright form and smaller, rougher leaves of a deeper green than those of wych elm, "probably not the U. montana rugosa of Mr. Masters". A specimen of U. montana rugosa, "the rugose Scotch elm", was among elms described at Royal Victoria Park, Bath, in the 1850s. It was still present in 1902.The Hesse Nursery of Weener, Germany, sold an Ulmus montana rugosa in the 1930s.

An Ulmus montana var. rugosa pendula was distributed by the Mount Hope Nursery (also known as Ellwanger and Barry) of Rochester, New York, from the 1880s. As Ulmus montana was used both for wych cultivars and for those of U. × hollandica, the cultivar named U. × hollandica 'Rugosa Pendula' (though not notably pendulous) growing at the Morton Arboretum (Acc. no. 652-62), received from Arnold Arboretum as Ulmus hollandica 'Rugosa Pendula', is likely to be the Ellwanger and Barry clone. It has leaves of 15cm (see Gallery). In the Netherlands, U. hollandica rugosa pendula (as Christine Buisman listed it) was present in Utrecht in the 1930s.

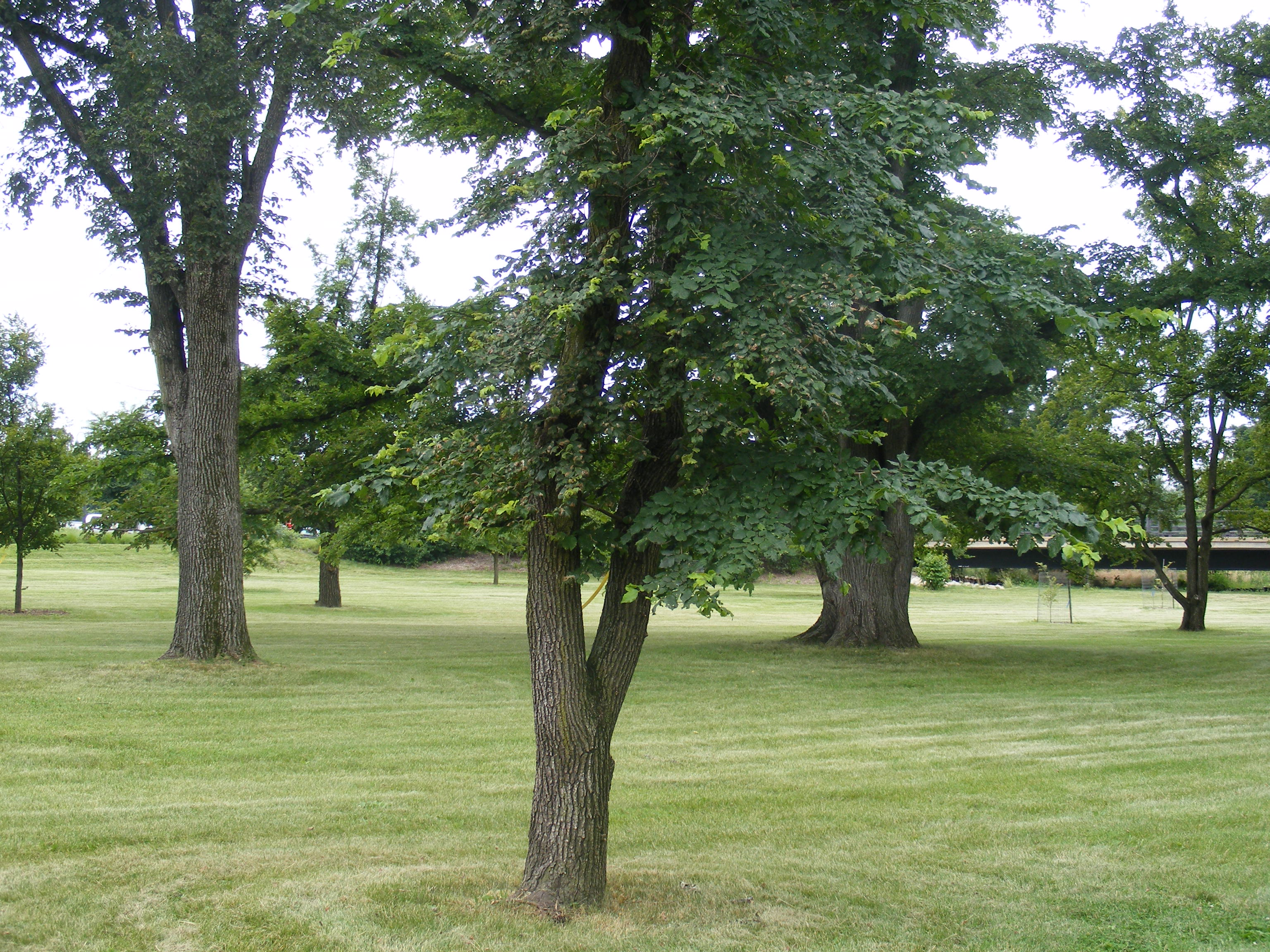
Ulmus × hollandica 'Rugosa Pendula', Morton Arboretum, US.

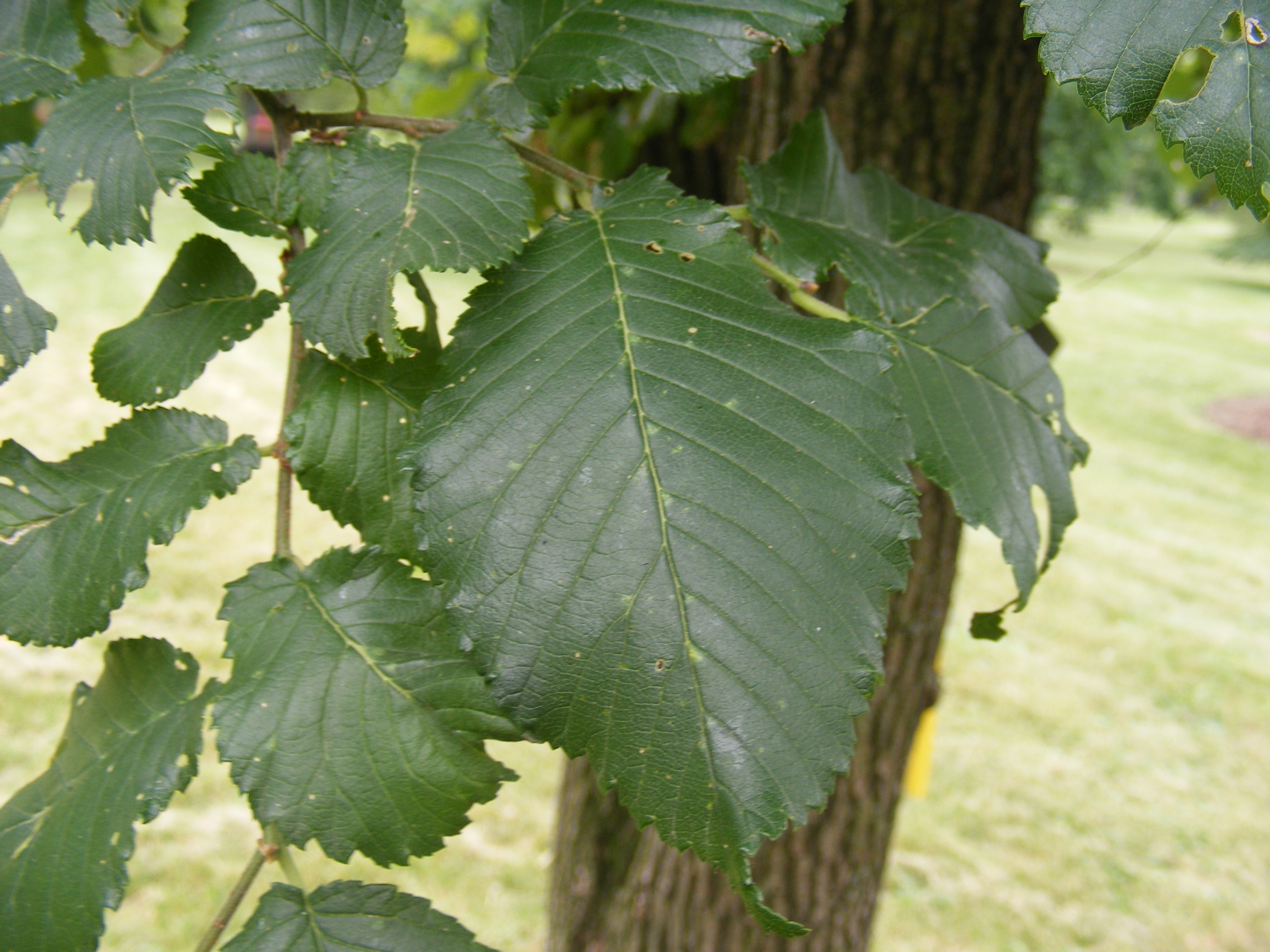
Leaves of same, Morton Arboretum, US.

== Accessions ==
North America

Morton Arboretum, US.
