= Ulmus × hollandica 'Dovaei' =

Elm cultivar

- Hybrid parentage: U. glabra × U. minor
- Cultivar: 'Dovaei'
- Origin: France

The putative hybrid elm cultivar Ulmus × hollandica 'Dovaei', or Doué elm, was raised by the André Leroy nursery at Angers, France, as Ulmus dovaei (without species name) before 1868. The Baudriller nursery of Angers marketed it as Ulmus Dowei, "orme de Doué", suggesting a link with the royal nurseries at nearby Doué-la-Fontaine, which stocked elm. Kew Gardens and Clibrans' nursery determined it an Ulmus × hollandica, though Green considered it a form of wych.

== Description ==
Leroy described the tree as vigorous, well-shaped, large-leaved, and "proper for avenues". The Adams nursery of Springfield, Massachusetts, reported that the leaves were "golden at first, but changing to a deep green". The Gaujard-Rome nursery of Châteauroux, France, described Orme Dovei as dark-green all summer. Kelsey's nursery of New York noted that it held its leaves late. The Mount Hope Nursery (also known as Ellwanger and Barry) of Rochester, New York, described 'Dovaei' as "a very erect, rapidly growing sort, with smooth bark and dark green leaves".

The Herbarium of the Arnold Arboretum holds a leaf-spray and samara specimen (1936) of an Ulmus glabra 'Dovaei' (spelled 'Davaei') sourced from the Ellwanger & Barry nursery. The leaves shown in this spray have petioles longer than the wych type (which are shorter than 5 mm) while the samarae are intermediate, confirming that the source tree, whether 'Dovaei' or not, was hybrid.

== Cultivation ==
'Dovaei' is not known to remain in cultivation. It was distributed by the Späth nursery of Berlin from the late 19th century, first as U. scabra Dovaei Hort. (1890), then as U. montana Dovaei (1892), Späth using U. montana both for wych cultivars and for some Ulmus × hollandica hybrid cultivars. The latter name was preferred at Kew Gardens, where there was a specimen, and by Clibrans' of Altrincham, Cheshire, who described it in their early 20th-century catalogues as "an upright, vigorous-growing variety with large leaves".

The tree was planted at the Dominion Arboretum, Ottawa, Canada in 1893 as U. montana Dovaei (syn. U. campestris Dovaei). It was introduced to the US in the 1870s, the Mount Hope Nursery of Rochester, New York, and (later) Kelsey's of New York, listing it as Ulmus 'Dovaei'. The Adams nursery of Springfield called it 'Dovei Elm', "a handsome new variety from France" (1895), and Klehms' of Arlington Heights, Illinois, 'Dove's large-leaf elm' (1913). It was planted as Ulmus Dovaei in Golden Gate Park, San Francisco, in the early 20th century. The Rockmont nursery of Boulder, Colorado called it 'Dovey's Scotch Elm'.

Introduced to Australia as U. montana Dovei, the tree was marketed in the early 20th century by the Gembrook or Nobelius Nursery near Melbourne (it was described as "a first-class novelty" in their 1918 catalogue) and by Searl's Garden Emporium in Sydney. It was planted along the Avenue of Honour in Ballarat in 1918. It is not known whether it survives there (avenue elms are listed only as " Ulmus sp.") or elsewhere in Australia.

=== Putative specimen ===
A young hybrid elm, sucker regrowth from an old Ulmus × hollandica, with hybrid samarae and alder-like leaves matching 'Dovaei' herbarium specimens, stands near the entrance to Lauriston Castle near Edinburgh (2024).

== Synonymy ==
- Ulmus Dowei: Baudriller Nursery, Angers, France. Cat. 43, p. 117, 1880.
- Ulmus glabra 'Dovaei': Arnold Arboretum, Boston, US.
- Ulmus montana 'Dovaei': Späth nursery, Berlin.
- Ulmus scabra 'Dovaei': Späth nursery, Berlin. Hort. (1890)
