= Ulmus minor 'Suberosa' =

Elm cultivar

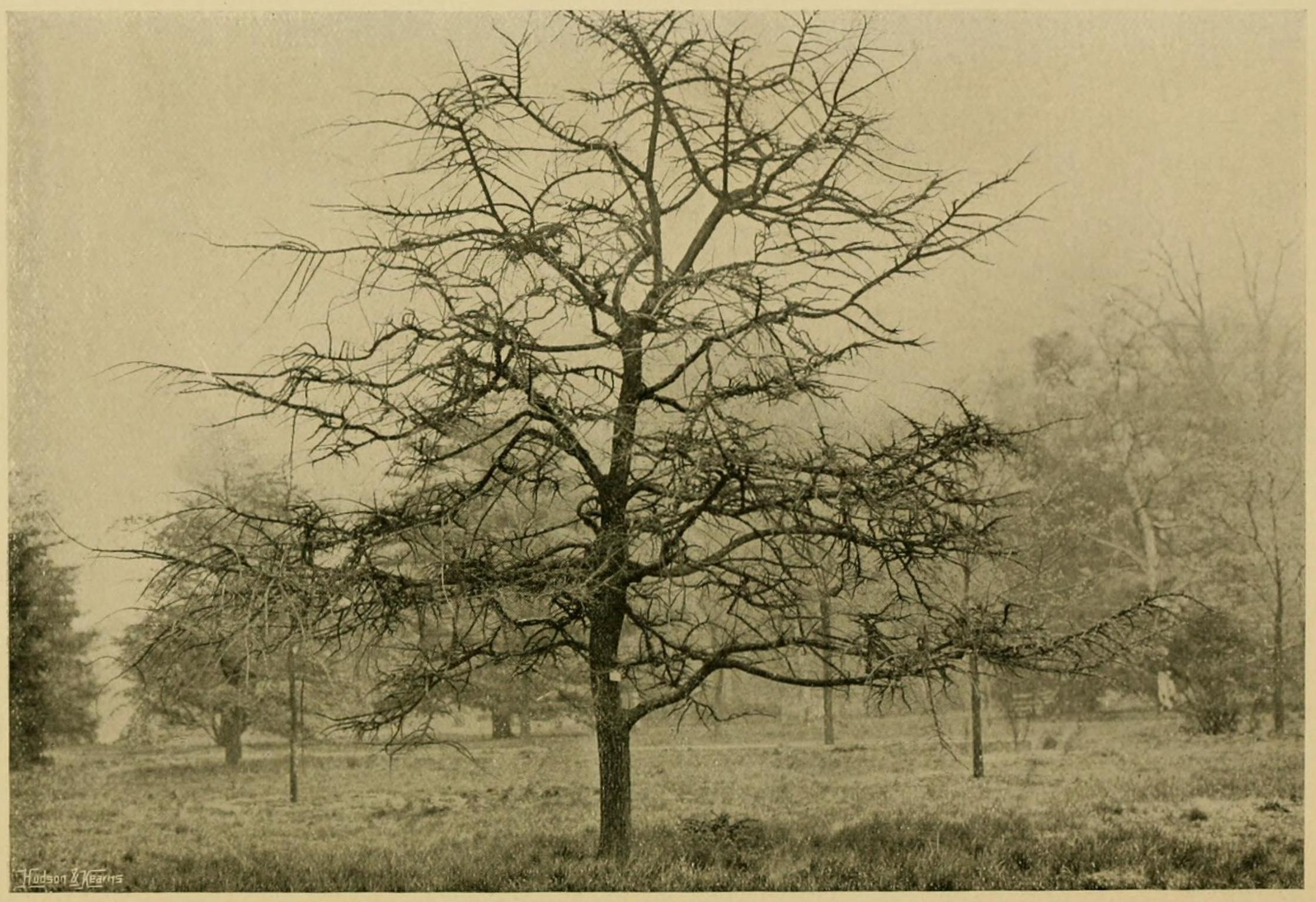
- 'Suberosa' before 1902.
- Species: Ulmus minor
- Cultivar: 'Suberosa'
- Origin: Central and eastern Europe

The Field Elm cultivar Ulmus minor 'Suberosa', commonly known as the Cork-barked elm, is a slow-growing or dwarf form of conspicuously suberose Field Elm. Of disputed status, it is considered a distinct variety by some botanists, among them Henry (1913), Krüssmann (1984), and Bean (1988), and is sometimes cloned and planted as a cultivar. Henry said the tree "appears to be a common variety in the forests of central Europe", Bean noting that it "occurs in dry habitats". By the proposed rule that known or suspected clones of U. minor, once cultivated and named, should be treated as cultivars, the tree would be designated U. minor 'Suberosa'. The Späth nursery of Berlin distributed an U. campestris suberosa alata Kirchn. [:'corky-winged'] from the 1890s to the 1930s.

Green and Richens, however, dismissed var. suberosa as just a genetically random, maritime or juvenile form of U. minor, insufficiently differentiated to merit varietal status, its name a relic of taxonomic conservatism. Richens noted (1983) that some Soviet botanists still accorded the tree species status, as U. suberosa.

== Description ==
Henry, having seen specimens in Slavonia, Croatia, and in Gisselfelde, Denmark, as well as at Kew, described the tree as having "branchlets of the second to the tenth year furnished with corky wings", but with "leaves and samarae as in the type". Krüssman and Bean report it to be "rather dwarf" in comparison with most U. minor. The Kew specimens (see below) suggest that its slow growth is probably not related to dry habitat. Given the widespread occurrence of variable suberose Field Elm across Europe, it is likely that most photographs of Field Elm with corky flanges on branches do not show the cultivated dwarf variety. Young and semi-mature trees of some Ulmus × hollandica cultivars, notably 'Major', the 'Dutch Elm' of Britain and Australasia, also develop corky bark.

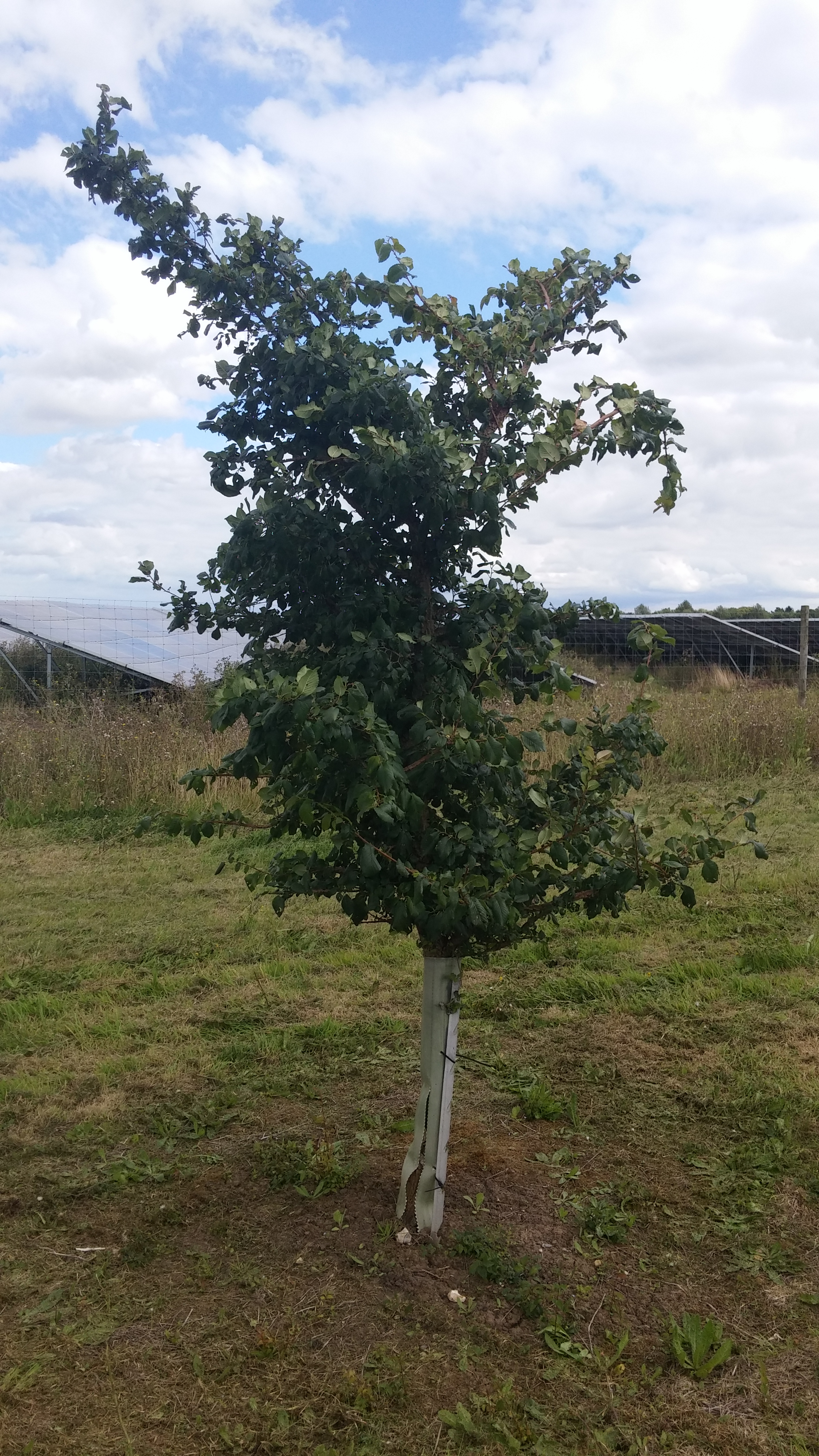
'Suberosa', Grange Farm Arboretum

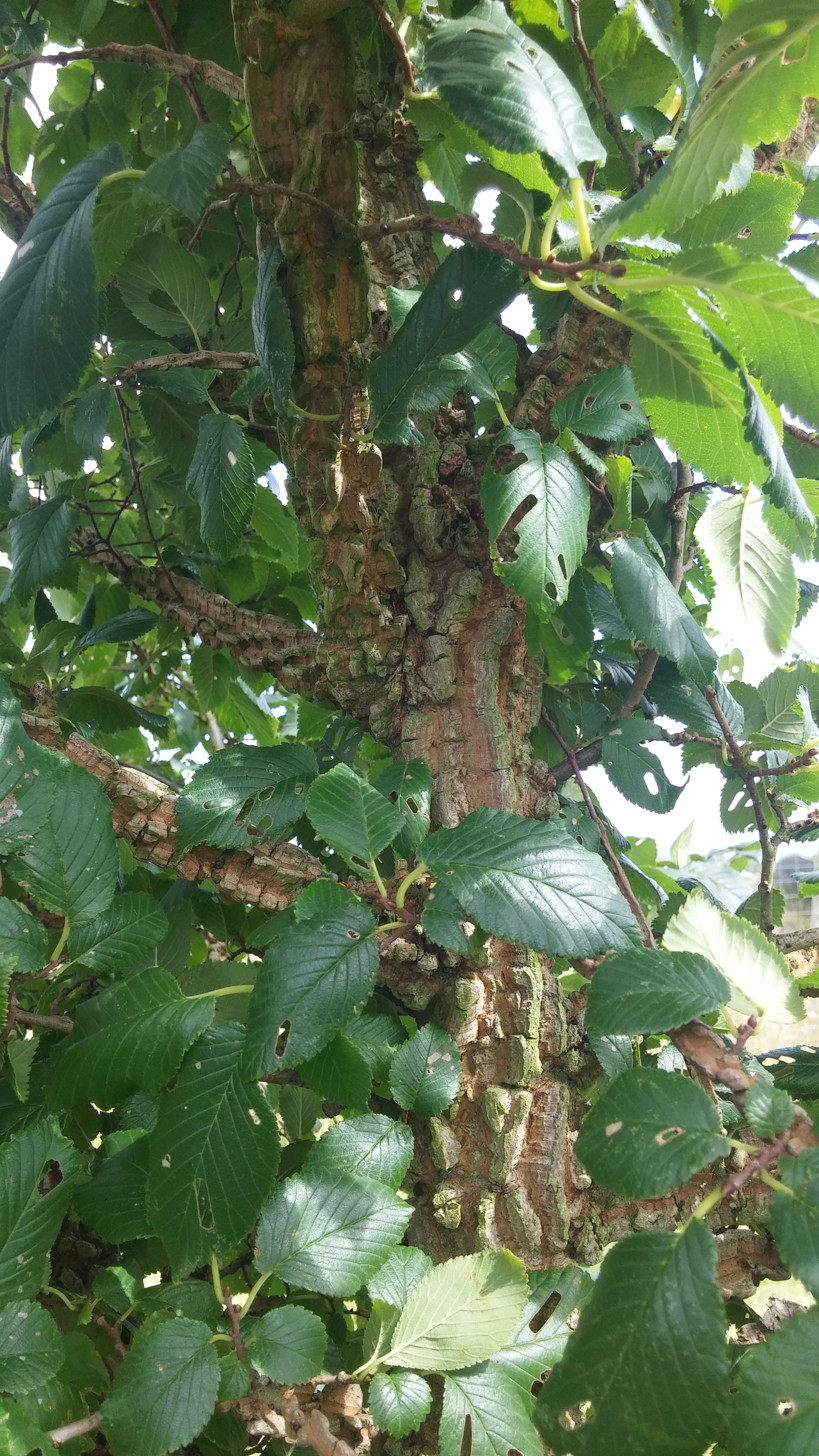
Corky stem

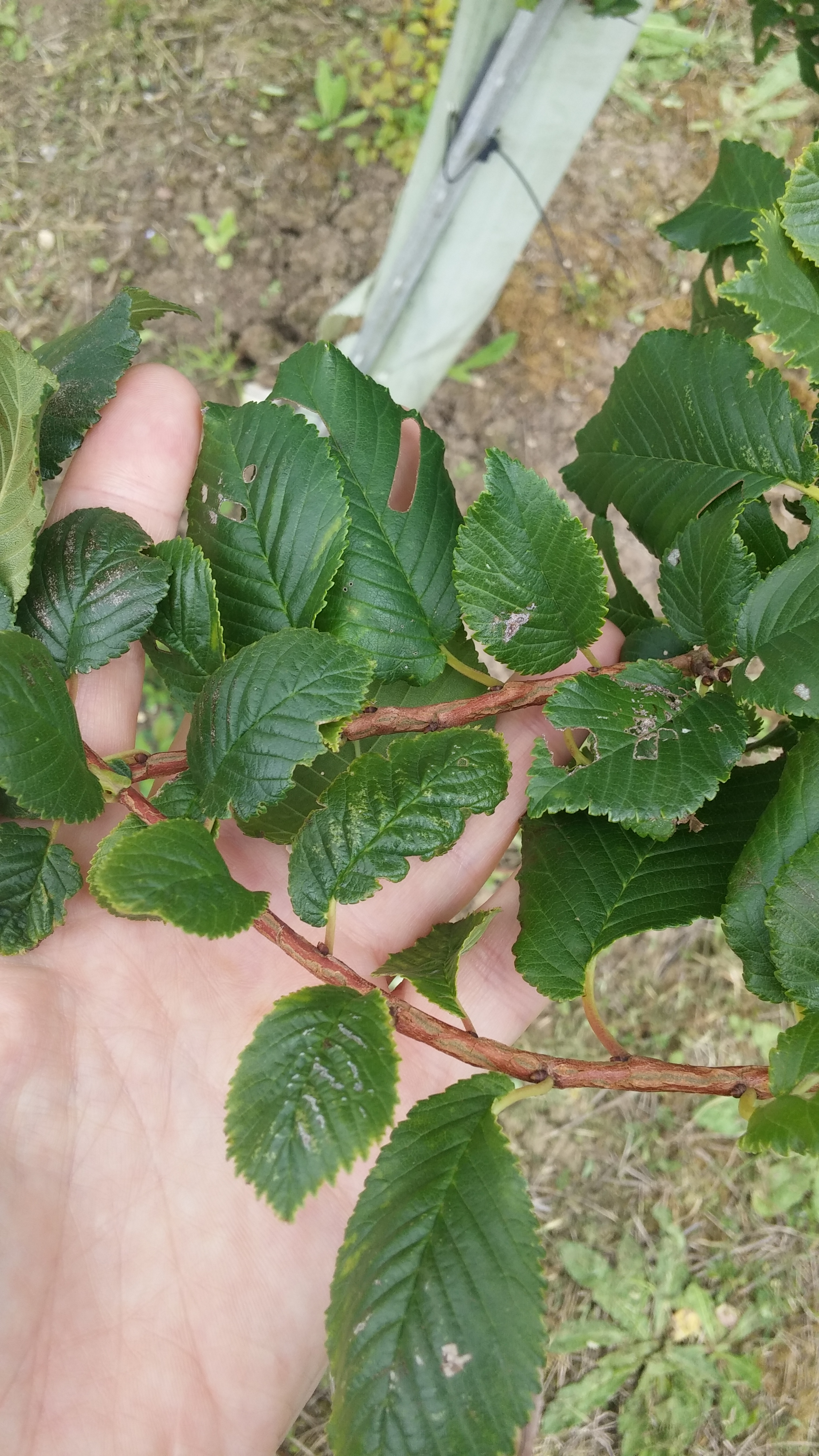
Leaves

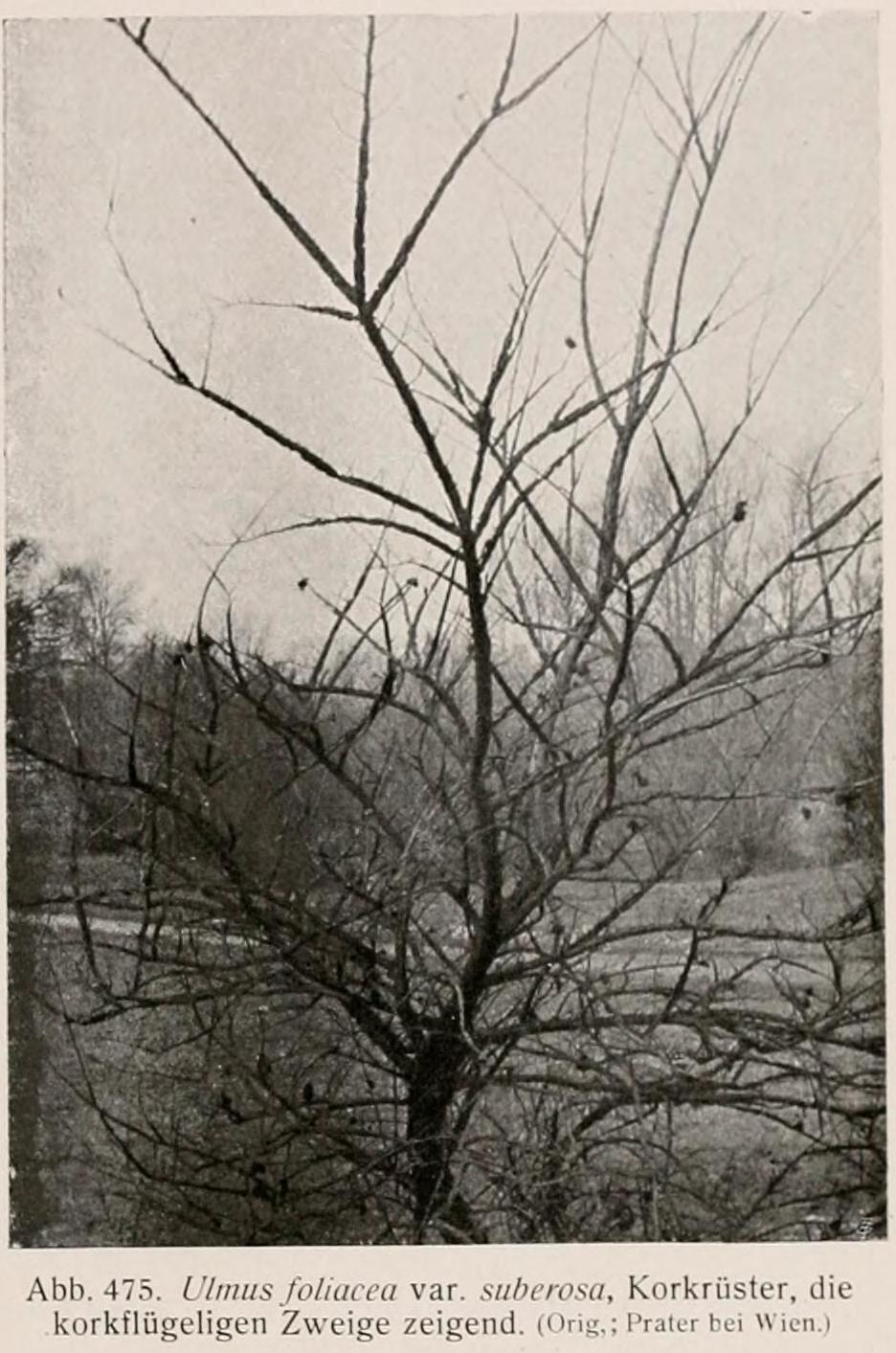
Winter branching of 'Suberosa'

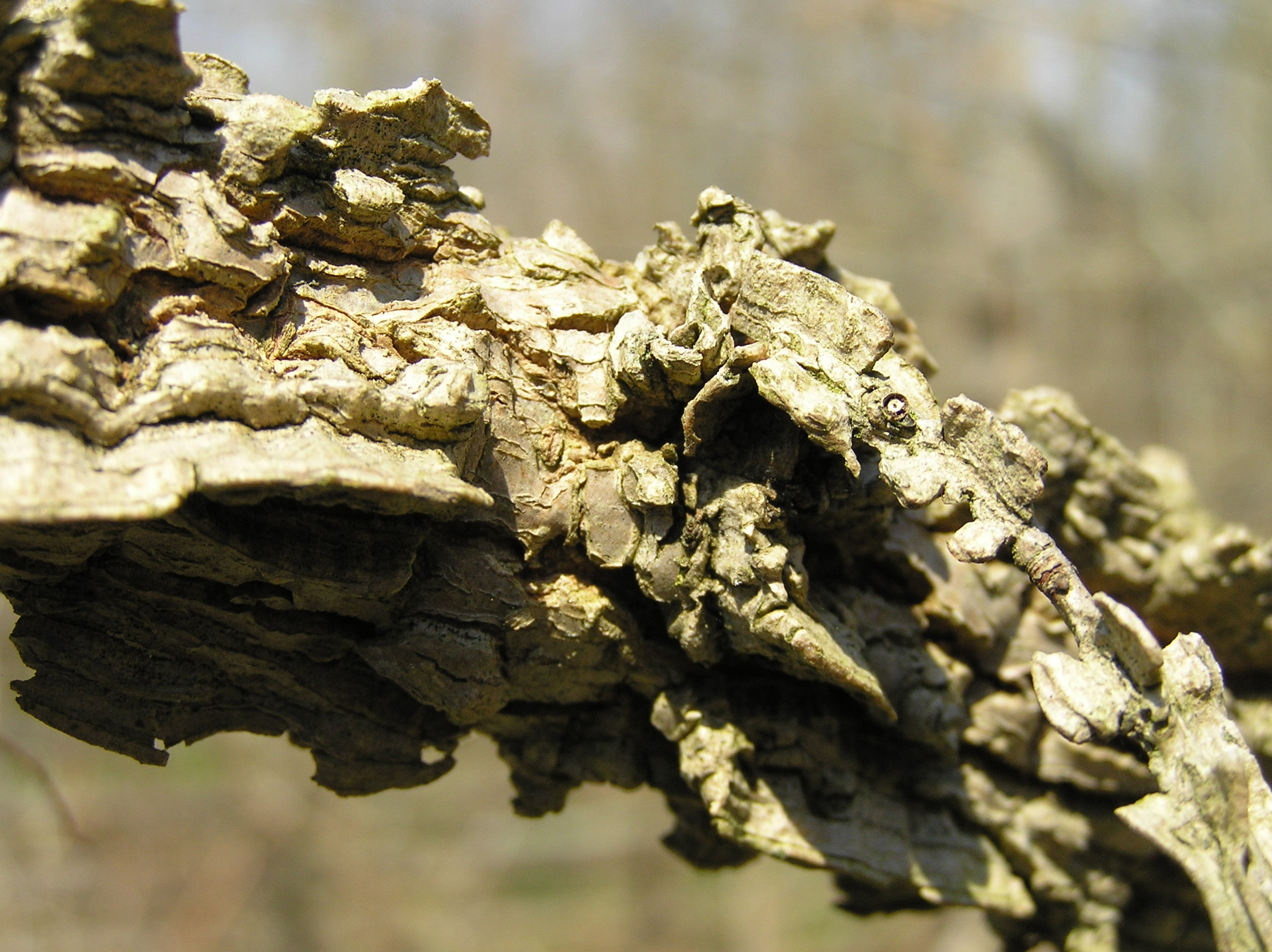
'Suberosa' Białowieża forest, Poland

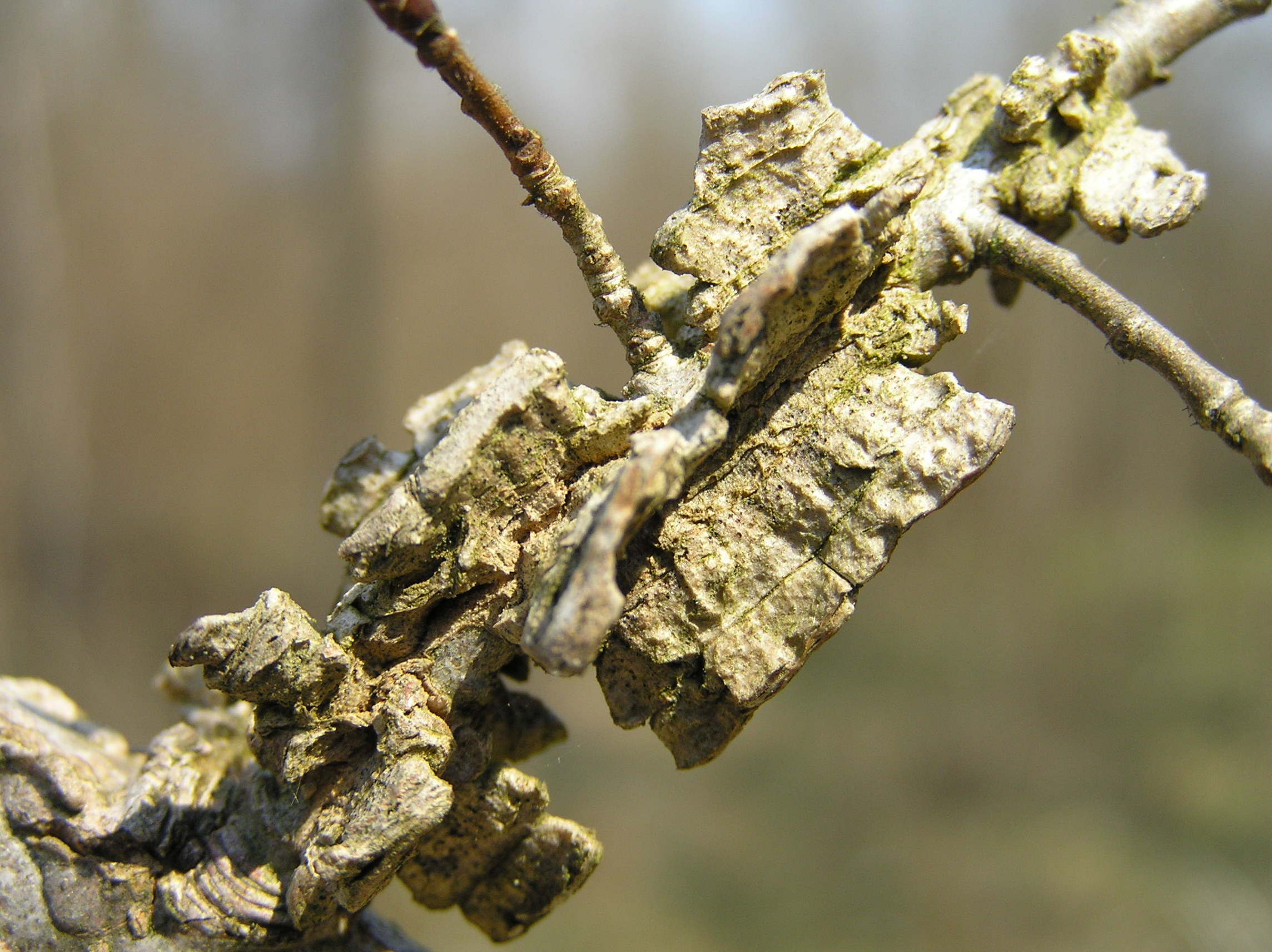
'Suberosa' Białowieża forest, Poland

== Pests and diseases ==
See under Ulmus minor.

== Cultivation ==
Field Elms labelled var. suberosa, presumably cultivated vegetatively to preserve the form, have been and continue to be included in a number of botanical collections, notably in central and eastern Europe. A striking specimen so labelled, with thick corky branches and branchlets giving a dense winter silhouette, stands in the Botanic Gardens of Visby in Gotland, Sweden; a second specimen, with an even denser winter form and bearing the cultivar name U. minor 'Stenstrup', stands in the Gothenburg Botanical Garden (height 20 m, girth 1.54 m, in 2014); and others are reported from elsewhere in Sweden, from the University of Copenhagen Arboretum, and from the Alexandru Buia Botanic Garden in the University of Craiova, Rumania. Ley (1910) said he had seen only cultivated specimens in Britain, in Salisbury Cathedral Close and in Kew Gardens. "Two young trees of this variety cultivated at Kew show the suberosity of the branches extending ten feet or more very beautifully." Two trees that stand along Sportlaan in Uithoorn, Netherlands, are used for propagation by Noordplant Nurseries. In 2007 Wijdemeren City Council planted one specimen of the cultivar 'Cloud Corky' in the Elm Arboretum at Catharina-Amalia Plantsoen, Loosdrecht.

A specimen of Späth's U. campestris suberosa alata was planted in 1897 at the Dominion Arboretum, Ottawa, Canada. Three specimens supplied by Späth to the RBGE in 1902 as U. campestris suberosa alata may survive in Edinburgh, as it was the practice of the Garden to distribute trees about the city (viz. the Wentworth Elm); the current list of Living Accessions held in the Garden per se does not list the plant. An Ulmus campestris suberosa was in Australian nurseries from the 1870s.

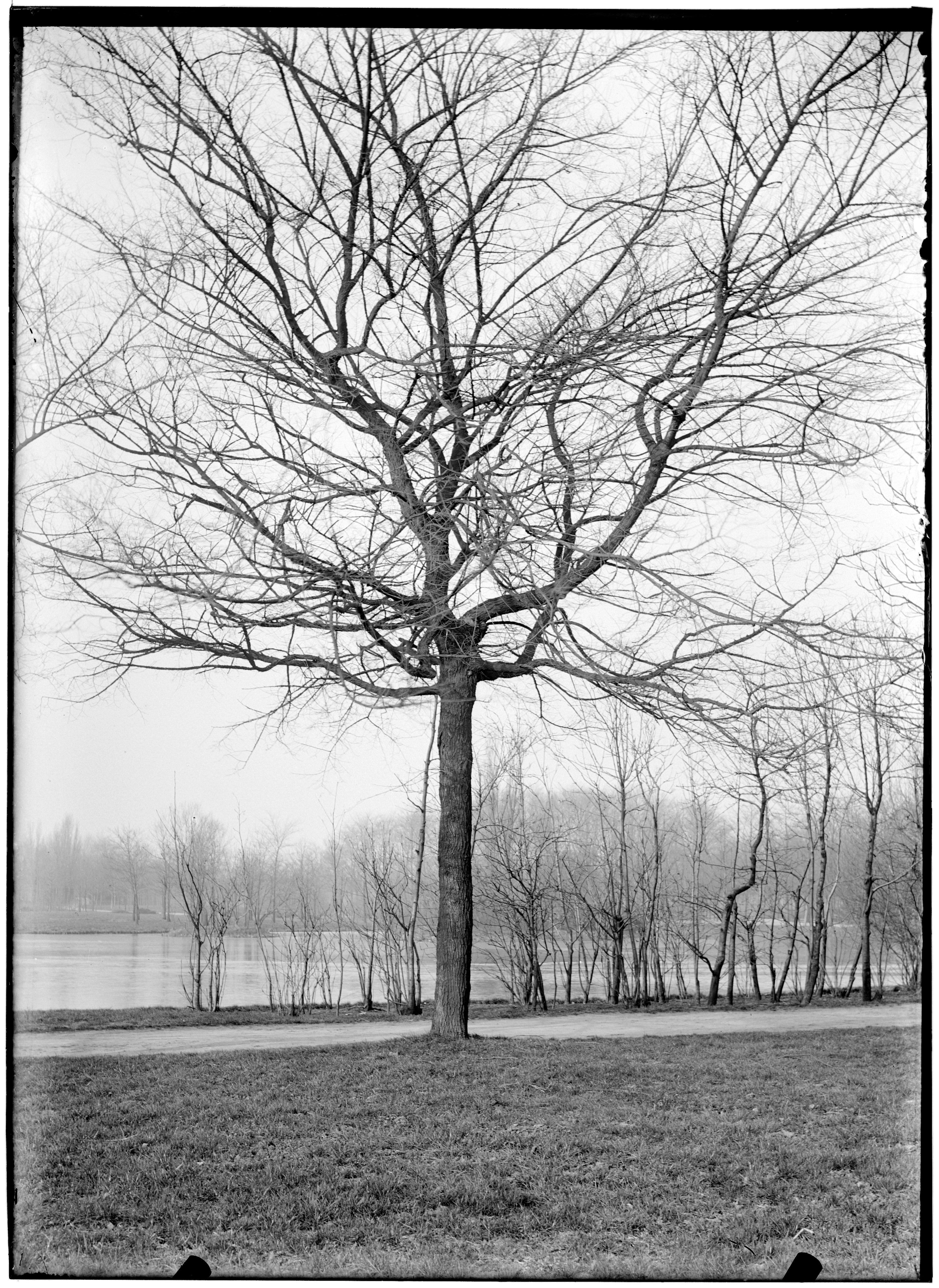
Suberose field elm, Vondelpark, c.1900

== Notable trees ==
Henry (1913) said there were four specimens at Kew, "of no great size, but of considerable age", long erroneously labelled U. alata.

== Varieties ==
- 'Suberosa Pendula'
- 'Suberosa Tortuosa'
- 'Stenstrup'
- 'Cloud Corky'

The field elm cultivar U. minor 'Cloud Corky' appears to have the narrow pyramidal form, short side branches, and extreme suberosity, of the 'Korkelm' in the Botanic Gardens of Visby, Gotland, Sweden, and of the U. minor 'Stenstrup' in the Gothenburg Botanical Garden, Sweden (see 'Cultivation').
