= Linden–South Historic District =

Historic district in New York, United States

- U.S. National Register of Historic Places
- U.S. Historic district
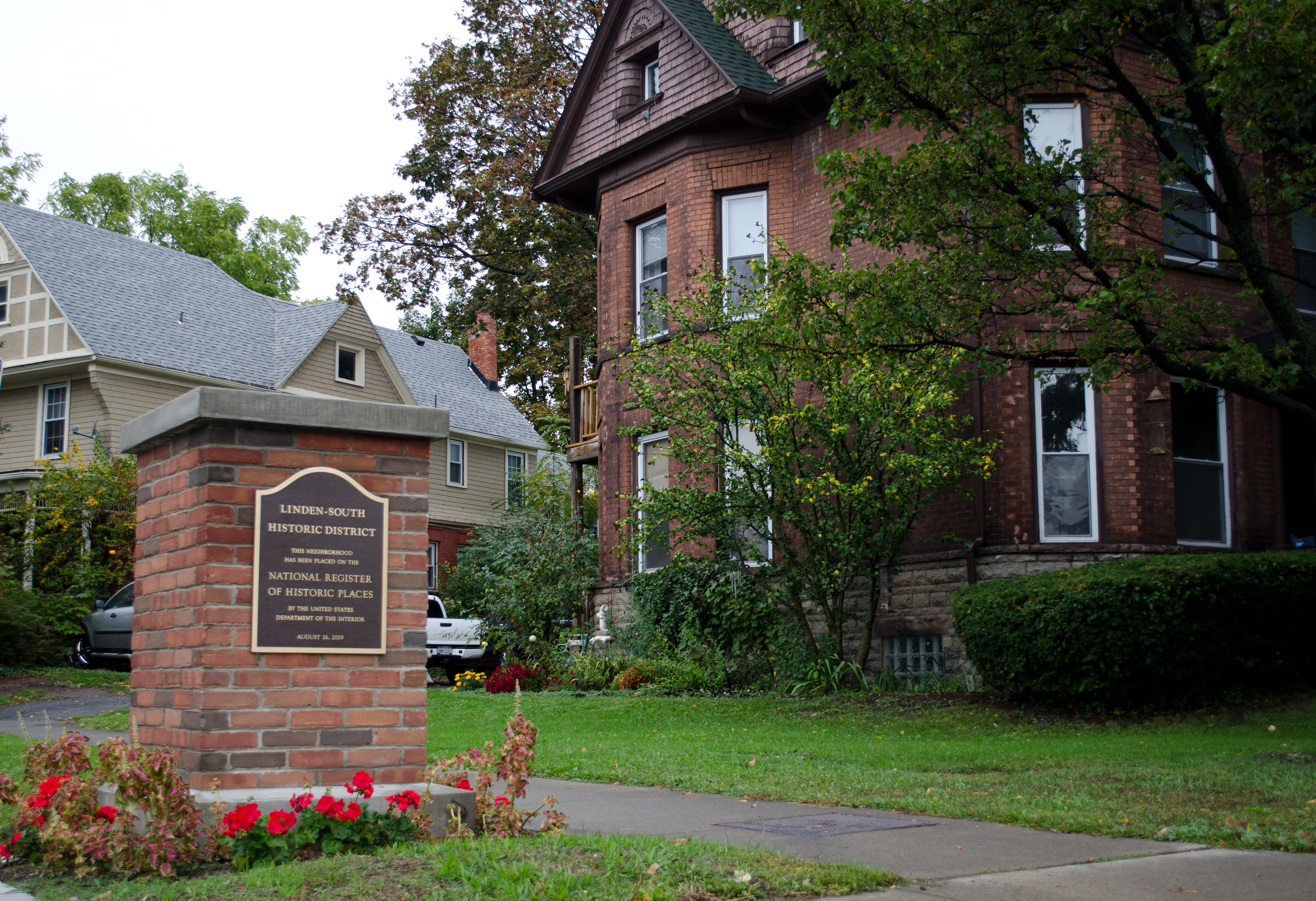
- Linden–South Historic District, October 2012

- Location within New York Location within the United States
- Location: 25-272 Linden St., both sides; 809-835 South Ave., odd numbers only, Rochester, New York
- Coordinates: 43°8′19.89″N 77°36′21.47″W
- Area: 15.5 acres (6.3 ha)
- Built: 1872-1913
- Architect: Ellwanger & Barry
- Architectural style: Gothic Revival, Italianate, Queen Anne, Colonial Revival
- NRHP reference No.: 09000655
- Added to NRHP: August 26, 2009

Linden–South Historic District is a national historic district located in the South Wedge neighborhood of Rochester in Monroe County, New York. The district consists of 136 contributing buildings, including 82 residential buildings, 53 outbuildings, and one church. The houses were constructed between 1872 and 1913 in a variety of vernacular interpretations of popular architectural styles including Gothic Revival, Italianate, Queen Anne, and Colonial Revival styles. The houses are 2 1/2-stories, are of frame or brick construction, and were designed by local architects employed by the developer Ellwanger & Barry. Among the more prominent are Andrew Jackson Warner and Claude Bragdon. The church is the former South Avenue Baptist Church, now Holy Spirit Greek Orthodox Church, built in 1909–1910 in a Late Gothic Revival style. Also in the district is a three-story, Queen Anne style mixed use building, with commercial space on the first floor and residential units above, located at 785 South Avenue (c. 1890).

The area was developed by George Ellwanger and his partner Patrick Barry after they entered the real estate business in 1856. The district is located on the oldest part of the Ellwanger & Barry nursery, which they subdivided into residential lots and developed between 1872 and 1913.

It was listed on the National Register of Historic Places in 2009.
