= Ulmus laevis 'Pendula' =

Elm cultivar

- Species: Ulmus laevis
- Cultivar: 'Pendula'
- Origin: Unknown

The European White Elm cultivar Ulmus laevis 'Pendula' is a little-known cultivar of disputed taxonomy.

== Description ==
A weeping tree, but with very corky winged branchlets, leading some authorities to consider the tree to be U. minor 'Propendens'.

== Cultivation ==
Only one specimen is known to survive in cultivation, at the ELTE Botanical Garden in Budapest, Hungary.

== Accessions ==
=== Europe ===
- Botanic Garden of Eötvös Loránd University of Sciences (ELTE Botanical Garden), Budapest, Hungary. Acc. no. 19980719
