= Ulmus minor 'Rugosa' =

Field Elm cultivar

- Species: Ulmus minor
- Cultivar: 'Rugosa'
- Origin: Belgium

The Field Elm (Ulmus minor) cultivar 'Rugosa' is a cultivar which was distributed by the Späth nursery, Berlin, in the 1890s and early 1900s as U. campestris rugosa Kirchner. Kirchner's tree, like Späth's a level-branched suberose field elm, was received from Belgium in 1864 as Ulmus rugosa pendula. Kirchner stressed that it was different from Loudon's Ulmus montana var. rugosa (Ulmus Rugosa), being "more likely to belong to U. campestris or its subspecies, the Cork-elm".

Green (1964) considered Ulmus rugosa pendula Kirchner a synonym of U. campestris suberosa pendula. Späth, however, listed U. campestris rugosa and U. campestris suberosa pendula as distinct cultivars in his 1903 catalogue, and distributed them separately.

It is not known whether herbarium leaf-specimens from the Wageningen Arboretum originally labelled U procera 'Rugosa' and renamed U. carpinifolia (1962) show Späth's tree. They show, however, a different clone from herbarium specimens labelled Ulmus hollandica Mill. rugosa pendula from Arnold Arboretum (1930) (see Ulmus hollandica Mill. Rugosa pendula, under Ulmus 'Rugosa', 'Cultivation').

Neither Kirchner's nor Späth's suberose 'Rugosa' is to be confused with the cultivar Ulmus montana var. rugosa.

== Description ==
Kirchner described Ulmus rugosa pendula as having small and glossy leaves, roundish ovoid and very rough, with the main branches spreading horizontally or slightly inclined, and very corky, the side branches being thin, short and hanging. Späth described his U. campestris rugosa Kirchner as a corky field elm with branches standing out horizontally.

== Pests and diseases ==
Not known.

== Cultivation ==
No specimens of Kirchner's or Späth's suberose 'Rugosa' are known to survive. One specimen of Späth's U. campestris rugosa was planted in 1898 at the Dominion Arboretum, Ottawa, Canada. Three specimens supplied by the Späth nursery to the Royal Botanic Garden Edinburgh in 1902 as U. campestris rugosa may survive in Edinburgh as it was the practice of the Garden to distribute trees about the city (viz. the Wentworth Elm); the current list of Living Accessions held in the Garden per se does not list the plant.

== Accessions ==
None known to exist
