= Eduard Petzold =

German landscape gardener

Carl Eduard Adolph Petzold (14 January 1815 – August 1891) was a German landscape gardener.

== Life ==
Petzold was born in Königswalde (Lubniewice), Brandenburg. As a child, he followed his parents in 1826 to Muskau, visiting the town's school and in 1828 the grammar school at Halle in Prussian Saxony.

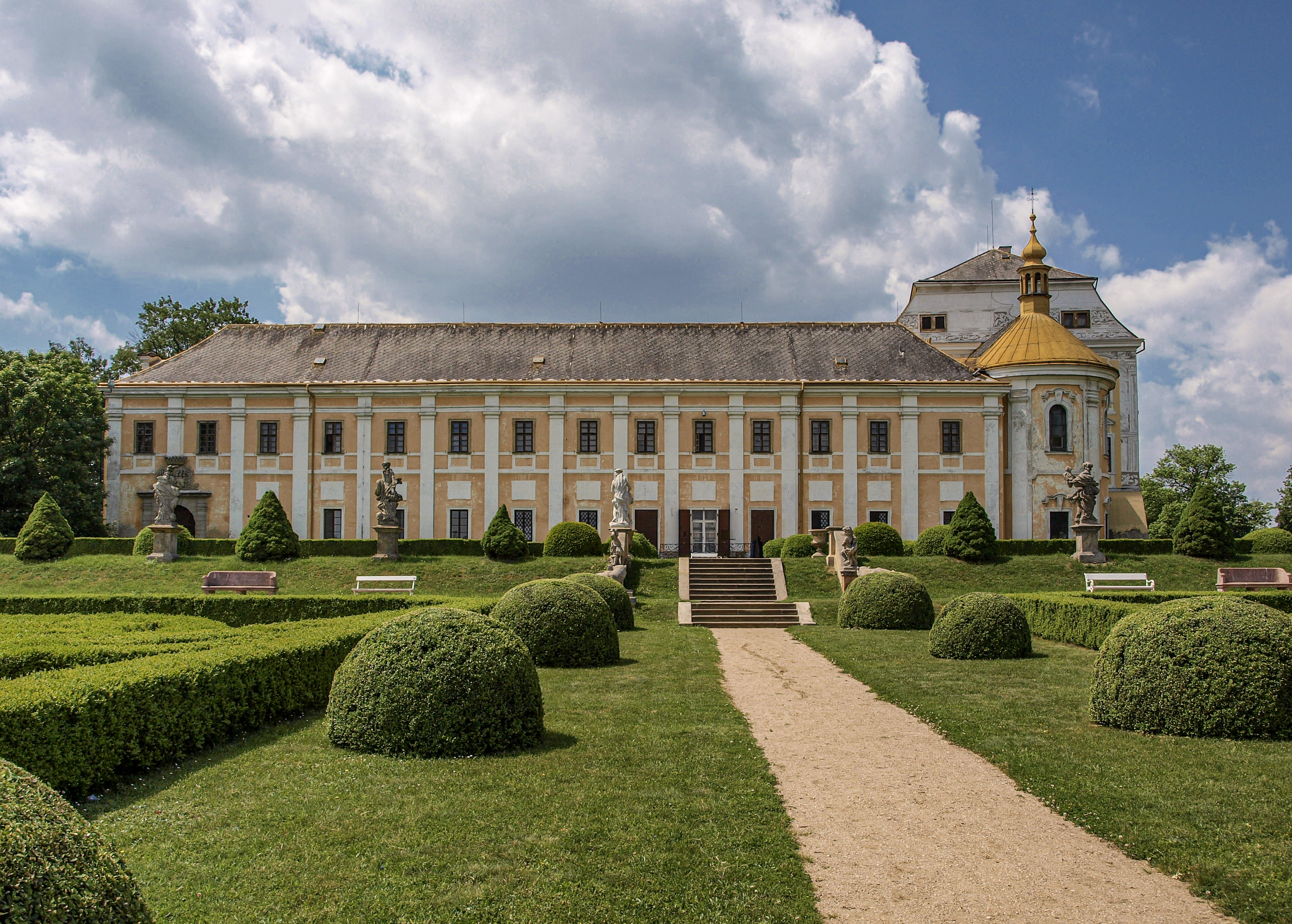
Castle Park in Lysá nad Labem, Czech Republic

In 1831, he started working at the Park von Muskau of the Prince Hermann von Pückler-Muskau, who turned out to be of great influence on his later work. 1835-38 he created his first Park at Matzdorf (Silesia). In 1844-52 he received the position of court gardener in Weimar, in 1852-1872 he returned as Parkinspector to Muskau, and was, in 1852-72, Director of Parks of the Netherlands.

He created 174 parks and gardens in Germany, Austria-Hungary, the Netherlands, Poland, Bulgaria, and Turkey.

He published frequently on his art, as well as biographical studies of other landscape gardeners, especially his study Fürst Hermann von Pückler-Muskau in seiner Bedeutung für die bildende Gartenkunst, of 1874.

== See also ==
- Schloss and park Altenstein

== Bibliography ==
- Michael Rohde: Von Muskau bis Konstantinopel. Eduard Petzold ein europäischer Gartenkünstler [in German], Dresden: Verlag der Kunst, 1998, ISBN 90-5705-119-2.
