= Johann Gerd Krüssmann =

Johann Gerd Krüssmann (1910–1980) was a German dendrologist and author.

Krüssmann worked as dendrologist from 1935, and from 1946 was the owner of a nursery and part-time horticulture teacher at the Horticultural Vocational School in Wesel and the county vocational school in Dinslaken. The Ellerhoop-Thiensen Arboretum was established in 1956 by Erich Frahm, its owner, in cooperation with Krüssman.

The standard author abbreviation Krüssm. is used to indicate this person as the author when citing a botanical name.

== Works ==
- Handbuch der Laubgehölze (Vols 1–3) (Paul Parey, Berlin and Hamburg, 1976); trans. Michael E. Epp, Manual of Cultivated Broad-Leaved Trees and Shrubs (Vols. 1–3) and Manual of Cultivated Conifers (Vol. 4) (Batsford, Timber Press, Beaverton, Oregon, 1984–6)
