= George Ellwanger =

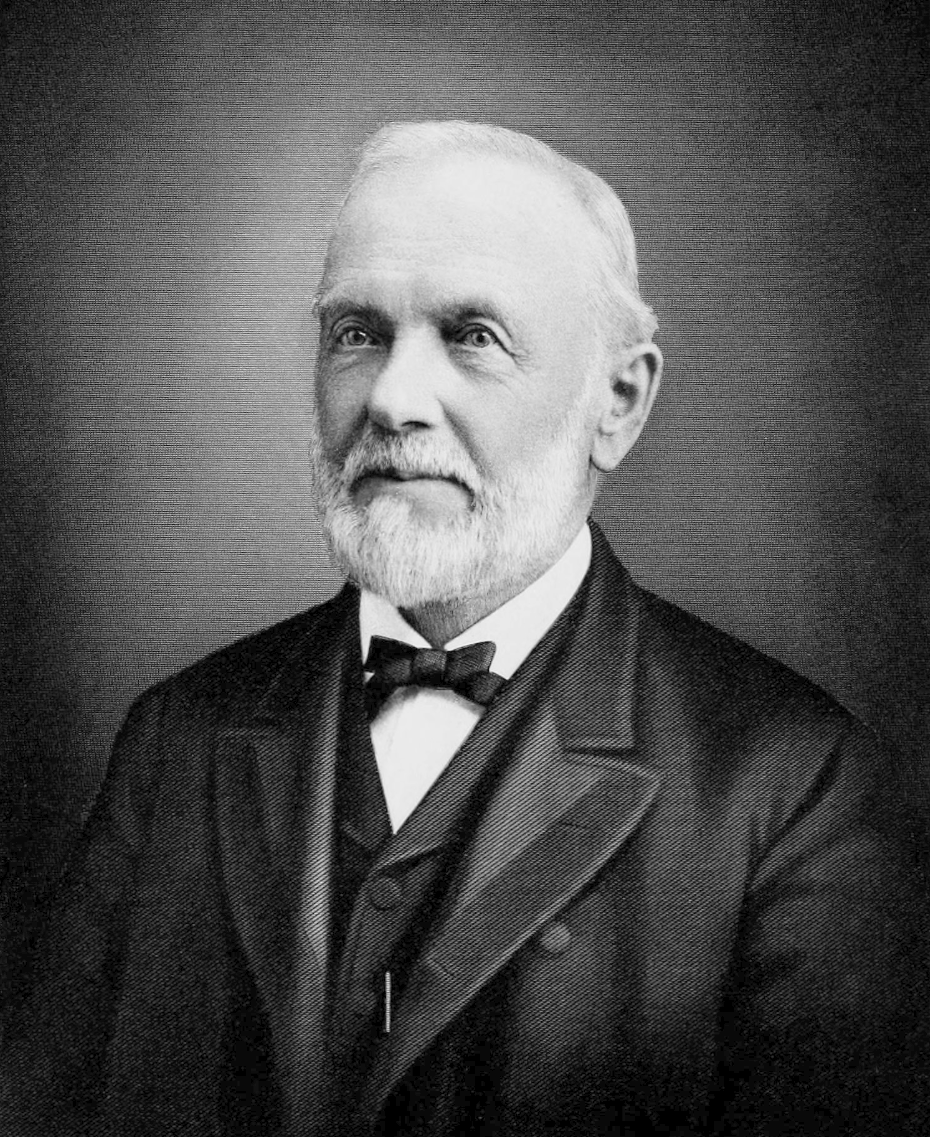
- Born: December 2, 1816; Großheppach, Kingdom of Württemberg
- Died: November 26, 1906 (aged 89); Rochester, New York, United States
- Burial place: Mount Hope Cemetery
- Occupation(s): Horticulturist, businessman
- Spouse: Cornelia Brooks (m. 1846)
- Children: 4

Signature
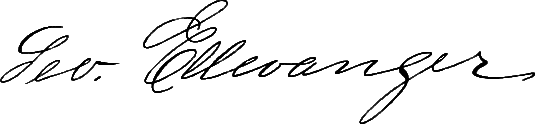

George Ellwanger (December 2, 1816 – November 26, 1906) was a German-American horticulture scientist.

== Early life ==
Ellwanger was born in Großheppach, Kingdom of Württemberg on December 2, 1816, and emigrated to the United States in 1835.

He married Cornelia Brooks in 1846, and they had four children.

== Career ==
After settling in Rochester, New York, Ellwanger joined with Patrick Barry to form the Mount Hope Nursery (also known as the Ellwanger and Barry Nursery) in 1840. He also became an American citizen in 1840. In 1843, the nursery began publishing catalogs to increase sales.

Ellwanger and Barry entered the real estate business in 1856. Between 1872 and 1913, the firm developed the area now known as Linden-South Historic District on the oldest part of the nursery. The district was listed on the National Register of Historic Places in 2009.

Ellwanger and Barry donated part of their property to the City of Rochester to form Highland Park. Their efforts helped change Rochester from the "Flour City" to the "Flower City".

== Personal life ==
Ellwanger died at his home in Rochester on November 26, 1906, and is buried across the street from his former nursery in Mount Hope Cemetery. The Ellwanger family monument was designed there by famous Italian artist Nicola Cantalamessa Papotti.
