= Patrick Barry (horticulturist) =

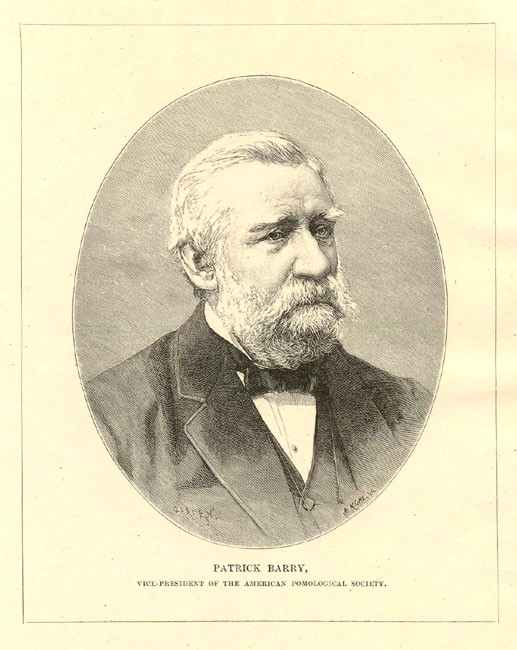
- Born: 24 May 1816; Belfast, Ireland
- Died: June 23, 1890 (aged 74); Rochester, New York, U.S.
- Occupations: Horticulturist, author

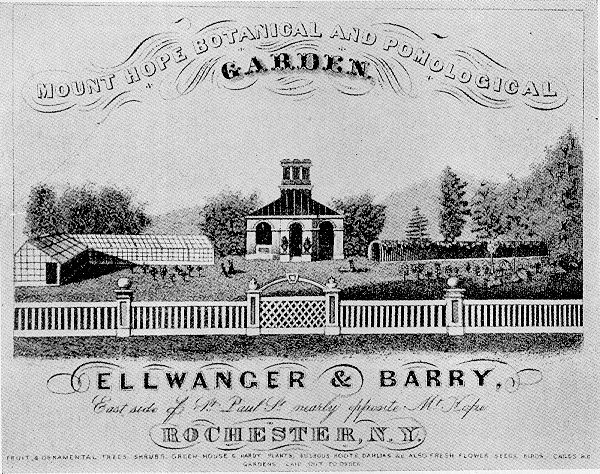
Mount Hope nursery advertisement

Patrick Barry (24 May 1816 – 23 June 1890) was an Irish-born American horticulturist and author. He was part-owner of the then-largest nursery in the United States.

== Biography ==
Barry was born on 24 May 1816, near Belfast, and came to America in 1836. After working for William Prince and Sons, proprietors of the famous Linnaean Nursery at Flushing, New York, in 1840 he and George Ellwanger co-founded the Mount Hope Garden and Nurseries in Rochester, New York, which introduced flower and fruit cultivation to Western New York and grew to be the largest such nursery in the country.

From 1844 to 1852, Barry edited The Genesee Farmer, which eventually merged into The Cultivator and Country Gentleman, and after Andrew Jackson Downing's death took over The Horticulturist. He also published the Treatise on the Fruit Garden (1851), which was revised and reissued as Barry's Fruit Garden in 1872, and compiled a monumental catalog of fruits for the American Pomological Society.

Ellwanger and Barry entered the real estate business in 1856. Between 1872 and 1913, the firm developed the area now known as Linden-South Historic District on the oldest part of the nursery. The district was listed on the National Register of Historic Places in 2009.

== Selected works ==
- Treatise on the Fruit Garden, 1851.
- Barry's Fruit Garden, 1872.
